= Valley Central High School =

Location
- 1175 State Route 17K; Orange County, New York; Montgomery, NY 12549; United States; 41°31′28″N 74°13′00″W

Information
- Funding type: public
- Opened: 1961
- School district: Valley Central
- Principal: Louis Adipietro
- Teaching staff: 111.74 (on an FTE basis)
- Grades: 9-12
- Enrollment: 1,399 (2023–2024)
- Student to teacher ratio: 12.52
- Hours in school day: 6.75
- Campus type: Rural
- Colours: Blue and white
- Athletics conference: Orange County Interscholastic Athletic Association
- Mascot: Viking
- Team name: Vikings
- Communities served: Most of town of Montgomery; portions of towns of Crawford, Hamptonburgh, Newburgh, Shawangunk and Wallkill; Villages of Maybrook, Montgomery, and Walden
- Feeder schools: Valley Central Middle School
- Website: Valley Central High School

Valley Central High School is located in Montgomery, New York. It educates students in grades 9-12 in the Valley Central School District, which includes much of the town of Montgomery, portions of neighboring Wallkill and Newburgh and the three villages of Maybrook, Montgomery and Walden as well as parts of Campbell Hall and Coldenham.

== History ==
"Centralization" to the Town of Montgomery immediately brought the hope that new structures would soon be underway to house the bulging classrooms of the three village schools and the rural school at St. Andrews. On July 2, 1958, when the new centralized district was one day old, the unofficially-named "Montgomery Central School District" held its organizational election and voted to seat nine members on the Board of Education.

As soon as the election was complete, discussions about new buildings began. In January 1959 the voters selected the Russell Site as the home for the proposed East Coldenham Elementary School, and the Muller Site for the junior and senior high schools. The following June, the voters approved a $4.2 million bond issue for the construction of these new buildings and renovation of the existing schools. By mid-March 1960, men and machinery had begun construction of what was to become, at the time, Valley Central Jr.-Sr. High School. After 18 months of labor, the new building opened on September 9, 1961.

== Campus ==
Map of New York highlighting Orange County.

The building was constructed in 1961, with some additions in the 1990s.The additions that were added was the pool & the English hallway. It has a wide lower level and a smaller second story. It is joined to the adjacent Valley Central Middle School.

The building boasts many amenities common to other high schools in the region: a swimming pool, gymnasium with wrestling room. For academic purposes, it has a full library and auditorium. Outside are the football field, baseball diamonds, tennis courts, and a track.

Architecturally, it reflects the era of its construction, with long straight hallways laid out in a grid pattern. The rear corridor runs all the way from the building exit near the gym on the east side to the middle school, almost a half-mile in length. There are several courtyards in the building, but they are rarely used today.

== Student population ==
The school has approximately 1,400 students currently enrolled in grades 9 through 12.

== Notable alumni ==
- Jason Motte (class of 2000), won a World Series ring as the closer for the 2011 St. Louis Cardinals
- Matt Morris, former starting pitcher for the St. Louis Cardinals, the San Francisco Giants, and the Pittsburgh Pirates
- Dave Annable (class of 1997), actor
- William Francis Moran (class of 1977), former United States Navy Admiral and Vice-Chief of Naval Operations
- James Karinchak, MLB pitcher
