= Walden Low Bridge =

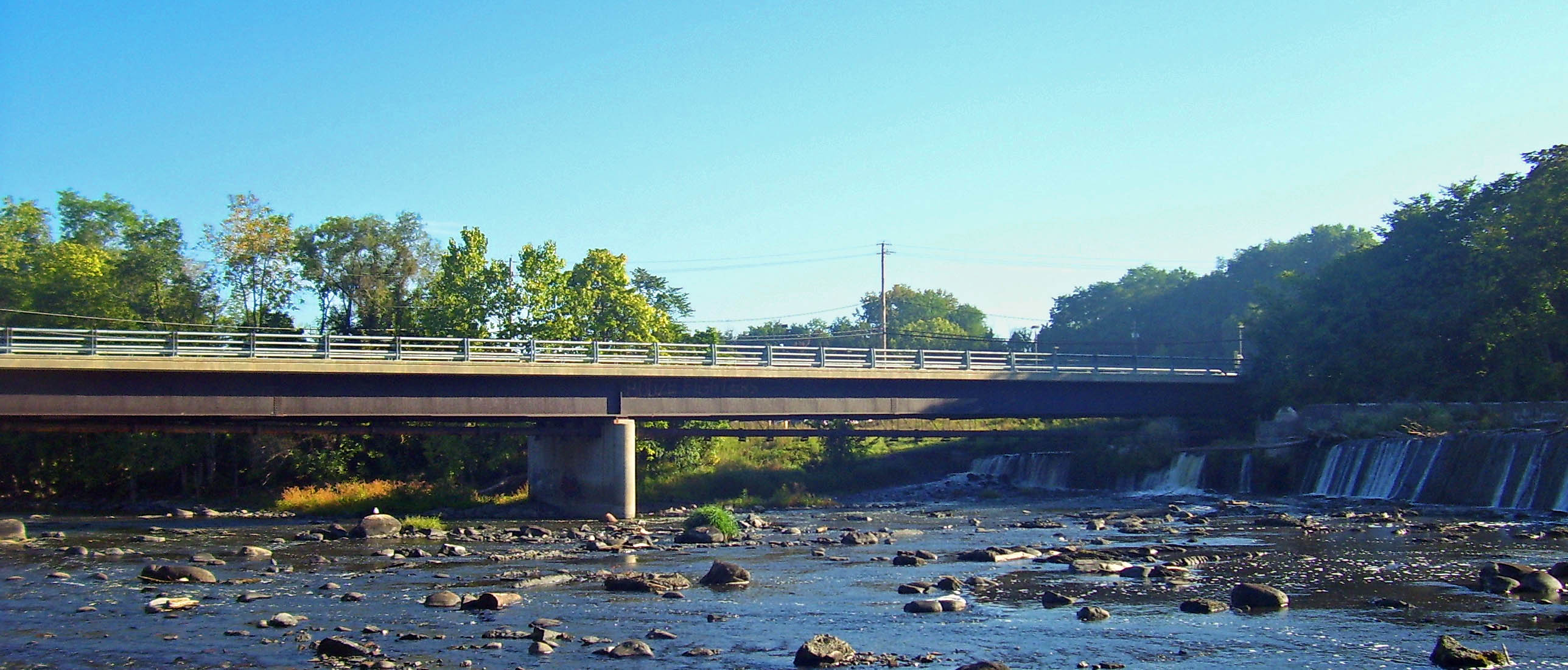
- Bridge and part of adjacent dam seen looking downriver, 2007
- Coordinates: 41°33′50″N 74°11′37″W
- Carries: Two lanes of Oak Street
- Crosses: Wallkill River
- Locale: Walden, New York
- Maintained by: Orange County
- ID number: 000000003344890

Characteristics
- Design: Steel continuous truss
- Total length: 349 feet (105.7 m)
- Width: 24 feet (7.3 m)
- Load limit: 73 tons (66 tonnes)

History
- Opened: 1987

Statistics
- Daily traffic: 2,800

The Walden Low Bridge is the downstream of the two bridges over the Wallkill River in Walden, New York, United States. It gets its name from being lower to the river than the Walden High Bridge a short distance upstream (replaced in 2005 by the new Walden Veterans' Memorial Bridge). It is a steel continuous truss bridge built in 1987, the latest in a series of bridges at that location that have been in place for at least a century. At 349 feet (105.7 m) in length, it is the longest bridge over the river in Orange County that carries a surface road.

Traffic on the bridge is low since it carries Oak Street, a local road, primarily residential, within the village. It is important to traffic circulation within Walden since its eastern approach is also the main entrance to the popular Thruway Market complex. Drivers coming into Walden from the west or southwest also use it to cross the Wallkill and bypass downtown Walden via Thruway's parking lot, back entrance and Albany Avenue to NY 208 northbound. During the construction of the new bridge, NY 52 was temporarily rerouted onto Oak Street, and traffic lights were erected for the duration at the 52/Oak Street junction and the Thruway entrance, causing some congestion at rush hours.

Like its counterpart, the Low Bridge is just downstream from a dam built to harness the river's power for industrial uses in the late 19th century. The shallows just below it are a popular place for anglers during the state fishing season.
