= St. Andrew's Cemetery =

St. Andrew's Cemetery may refer to:

- St. Andrew's Cemetery (Grand Rapids, Michigan), listed on the National Register of Historic Places in Kent County, Michigan
- St. Andrew's Cemetery (Walden, New York), listed on the National Register of Historic Places in Orange County, New York
- St. Andrew's Episcopal Church and Cemetery, listed on the National Register of Historic Places in Woodleaf, North Carolina
