= Jacob T. Walden Stone House =

1730s stone house in Walden, New York

- U.S. National Register of Historic Places
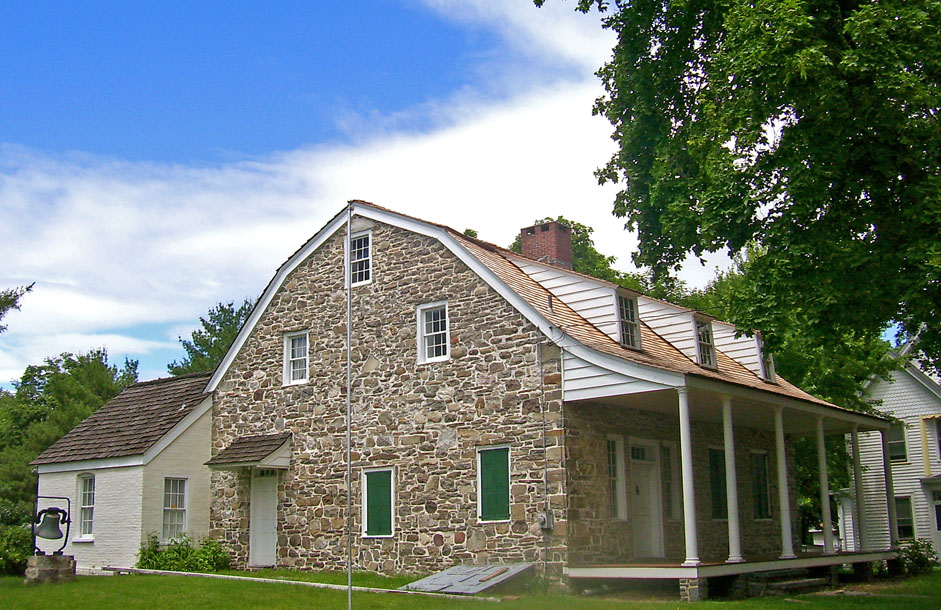
- The Jacob Walden House in 2006

- Location within New York Location within the United States
- Interactive map showing the location of Jacob T. Walden Stone House
- Location: Walden, NY
- Nearest city: Newburgh, NY
- Coordinates: 41°33′54″N 74°11′42″W
- Area: less than one acre
- Built: 1785, 1820s
- Architectural style: Colonial
- NRHP reference No.: 02000138
- Added to NRHP: March 12, 2002

The Jacob T. Walden Stone House is on North Montgomery Street (NY 52) near the intersection with Wait Street in Walden, New York. It was built around 1785, around the time the thousand-acre (400 ha) Gatehouse Patent was first sold, and is one of the oldest houses remaining in the area.

In the 1820s, Jacob Treadwell Walden, a successful shipping merchant, came to the area from New York City and saw the potential of the Wallkill River for powering textile mills. With him, he brought Jesse Scofield and Dr. Seth Capron who had expertise in running woolen mills. They formed the Franklin Company to finance mills in Walden and dammed the Wallkill [which runs through the middle of Walden] above the falls, creating a power station that remains in use today. He resided there with his family beginning in the 1820s until sometime after 1840. (See U.S. Federal Census for 1840) On the waning of the textile mills, he returned to New York City and died there in 1855. The village of Walden, New York bears Jacob Walden's name.

The Jacob T. Walden House houses the Walden Historical Society, and is open to the public as a museum on a limited basis. In 2005, the exterior underwent extensive restoration.

== See also ==
- National Register of Historic Places listings in Orange County, New York
