= Sturgeon Pool =

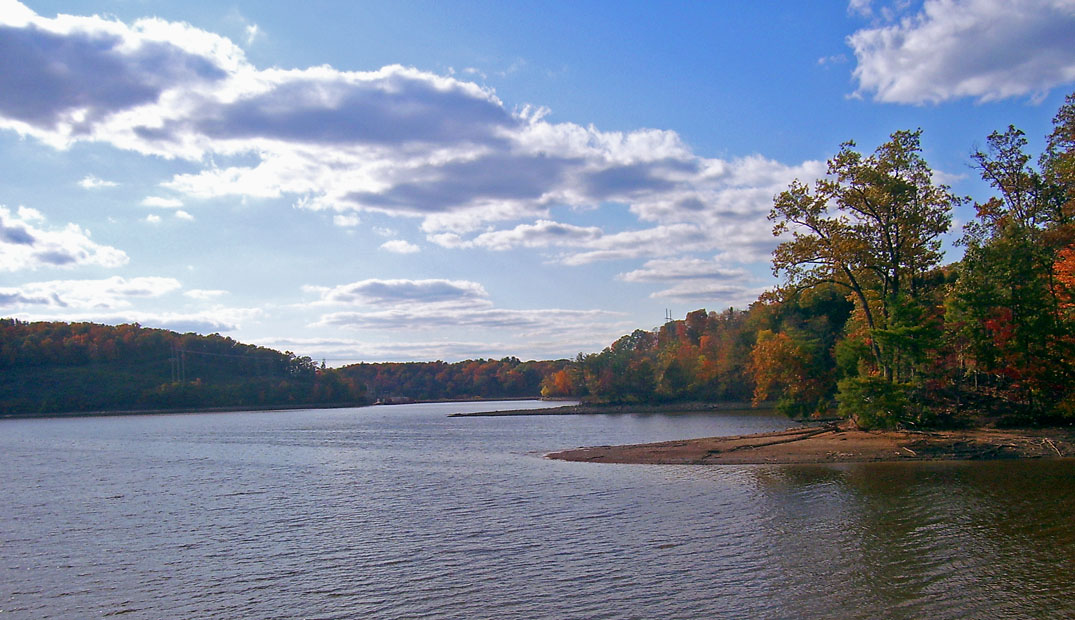

- Location within New York
- Location: Ulster County, New York
- Coordinates: 41°50′37″N 74°02′34″W
- Type: reservoir
- Primary inflows: Wallkill River
- Primary outflows: Wallkill River
- Basin countries: United States
- Surface area: 194 acres (79 ha)
- Average depth: 34 ft (10 m)
- Max. depth: 93 ft (28 m)
- Shore length^{1}: 4.4 mi (7.1 km)
- Surface elevation: 131 ft (40 m)
- ^{1} Shore length is not a well-defined measure.

Sturgeon Pool is a reservoir near the hamlet of Rifton, in the Town of Esopus in Ulster County, New York.

It was created by damming the Wallkill River just above its confluence with Rondout Creek for hydroelectricity (thus the flow of the Wallkill that reaches the Rondout is greatly attenuated, making the Wallkill a rare instance of a river that drains into a creek).

Writer J MacKinnon says that due to damming of the water supplies and overfishing, there are now no sturgeon in Sturgeon Pool.

Fish found in the lake include; smallmouth bass, largemouth bass, carp, bluegill, black crappie and white perch.
