= Drowned lands =

Drowned lands is a name sometimes given to seasonally flooded areas, or to areas flooded by reservoirs. Sometimes it is poetically applied to lands said to have been lost to the sea, such as Lyonesse.

There are certain locations particularly identified with this appellation:

== United States ==
- Ancram, New York, in the valley of Punch Brook
- Fish House, New York, now covered by Great Sacandaga Lake
- Between Hamburg, New Jersey and Denton, New York, along the Wallkill River, drained to form the "Black Dirt Region"
- Medford, New Jersey
- Along the Wabash River in Indiana
- Putnam, Dresden and Whitehall, New York, at the south end of Lake Champlain

== Netherlands ==
- Verdronken Land van Saeftinghe
- Verdronken Land van Reimerswaal
