= Tin Brook =

Short tributary of the Wallkill River in Orange County, New York

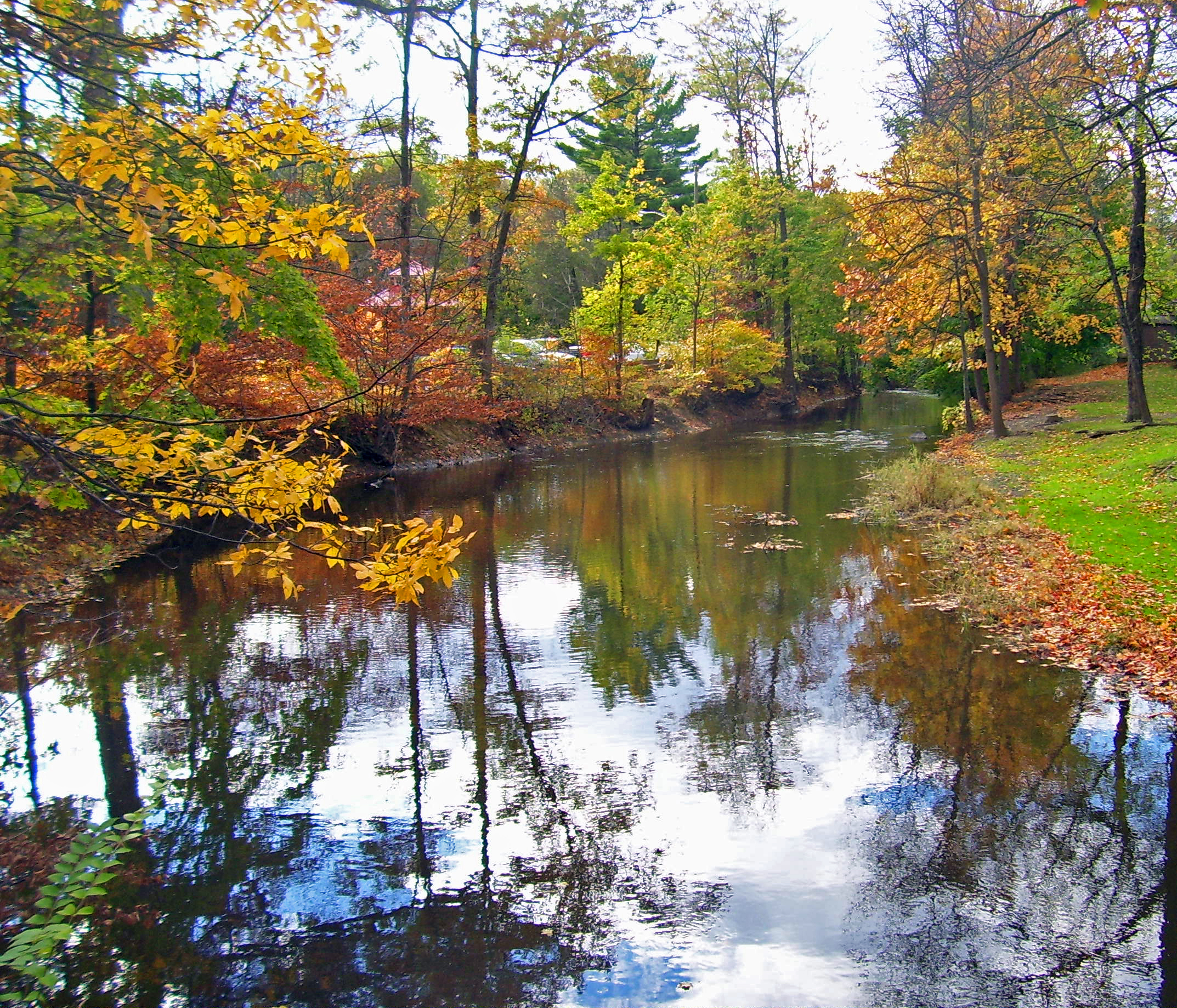
- Tin Brook in Walden's Wooster Memorial Grove
- Etymology: Early settler known as John Tinne or Tinbrook, various Dutch words

Location
- Country: United States
- State: New York
- County: Orange
- Municipality: Town of New Windsor, Town of Montgomery, Village of Walden

Physical characteristics
- Source
  - location: S of Coldenham
  - coordinates: 41.5118°N 74.1520°W
  - elevation: 420 ft (130 m)
- Mouth: Wallkill River
  - coordinates: 41.5753°N 74.1905°W
  - elevation: 260 ft (79 m)
- Length: 9 mi (14 km)
- Basin size: 19.2 mi^{2} (50 km^{2})

Tin Brook is a 9-mile-long (14 km) tributary of the Wallkill River almost entirely located in the town of Montgomery in Orange County, New York, United States, where it drains 19.2 square miles (50 km^{2}). Near its mouth it flows through the village of Walden. It is one of the few named tributaries of the Wallkill that drain into it from the lowlands between it and the Hudson River to the east, rather than the Shawangunk Ridge to the west.

Several possible origins have been proposed for the name, which appeared on local maps as early as 1774. The most likely points to an early landowner along the midlands of the stream variously named John Tinne, Thinne or even John Tinbrook. Another theory suggests that it was named by the Dutch settlers who were the first European inhabitants of the Hudson Valley and that it comes from the words meaning "thin breeches" in that language. Supposedly one of them had reconnoitered south from New Paltz and found the soils around the brook to be thin, or insufficiently deep for the kind of farming they preferred.

== Course ==
Tin Brook rises in a 535-acre (217 ha) complex of wetlands and vernal pools on the northern edge of Stewart State Forest, near Interstate 84. Almost immediately afterwards it crosses the Montgomery town line from New Windsor, and then reaches NY 17K. It continues flowing north through rural, mostly wooded land, veering slightly eastward and receiving an unnamed right tributary, until it reaches NY 52. There it receives another tributary, turns south, and crosses the highway again.

It loops again very quickly, turning north after passing a trailer park. Now wider, it crosses 52 again between Berea and St. Andrew's roads. It then turns west and runs roughly parallel to the highway until it reaches the Walden village limit, where it turns south and crosses 52 for a third time in the midst of a residential neighborhood. Here it makes a long loop around the village's Wooster Memorial Grove park and comes so close to its upper course that it can be found on both sides of the main entrance road near 52. It meanders south again through some light industrial neighborhoods, then crosses 52 for the last time a short distance east of the park.

Then it turns west, running aside 52 (now West Main Street) for a block, then north to divide a residential neighborhood and a commercial property. In the woodlands north of the village, Tin Brook turns west for the last time, crosses under NY 208 and then drains into the Wallkill.

== History ==
In 1724 Cadwallader Colden, a future colonial official whose 3,000-acre (1,200 ha) estate included much of the brook's headlands, proposed that the many rivers and streams of New York be tapped for canals to improve transportation across the colony. He decided to use his own land as a demonstration project, diverting some of the brook's waters into a pond which fed a short canal, the first in New York. Its rafts carried peat for fuel and stone to build his house, and whatever other freight was needed around the estate.

In 1892, the brook provided water for Walden's first municipal electric utility, a coal-fired power plant on Elm Street. At the time only the mills on the Wallkill generated power, and that was used mostly for the mills themselves. The Elm Street plant, which still stands although it is used for other purposes, began providing power for the village in 1893. Within 15 years demand outstripped supply, and as the knifemaking plants along the Wallkill river went into decline, they began providing power to the village, supplanting the Elm Street plant.

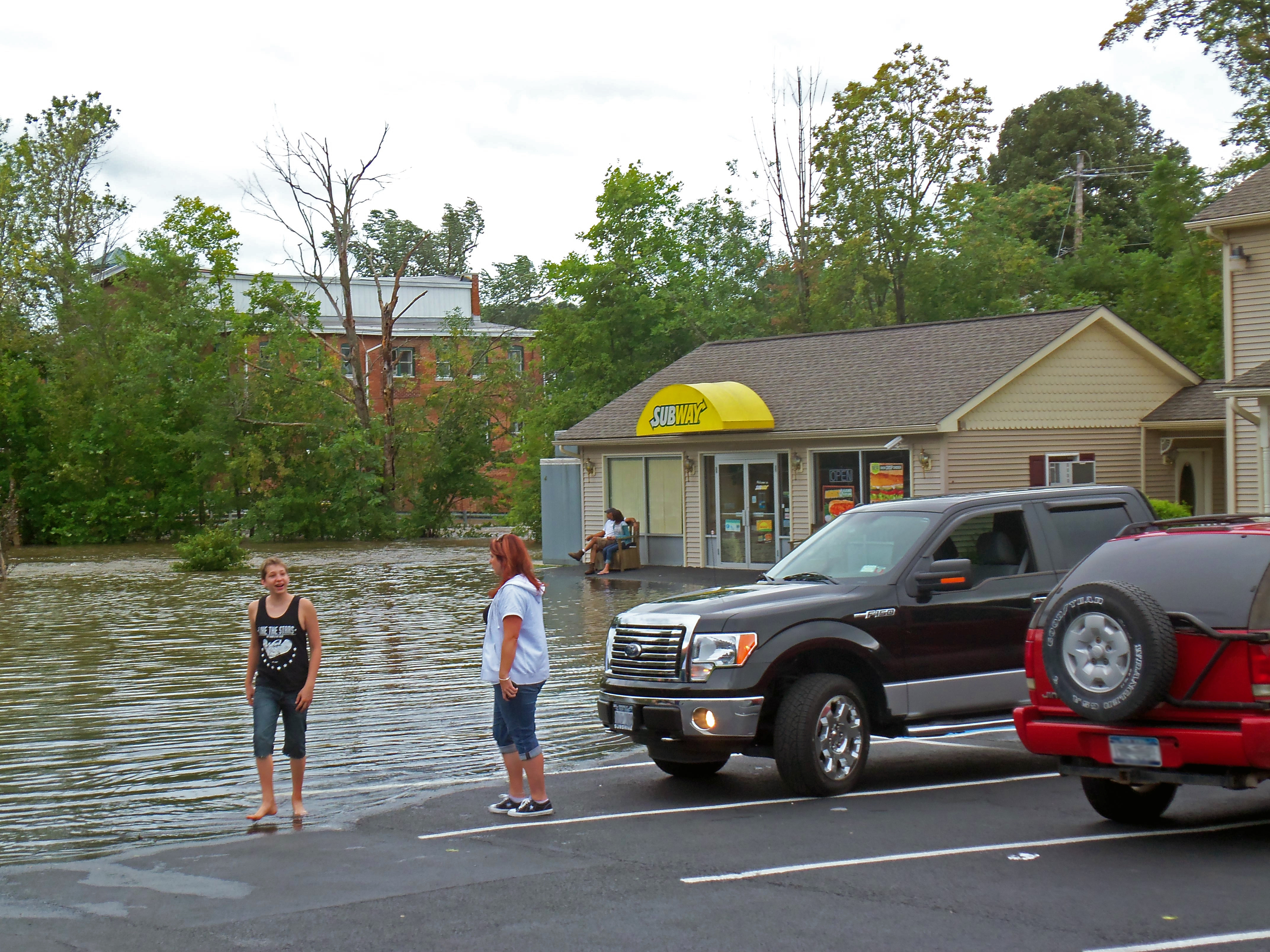
Flooding after Hurricane Irene in Walden

After heavy rains, Tin Brook sometimes floods near its mouth, particularly at Wooster Grove. Following Hurricane Irene in August 2011, the creek rose to such a height that not only was most of the park flooded, some nearby areas were as well, forcing the village of Walden to close some streets. Further upstream, the intersection of Route 52 and St. Andrew's Road also had to be closed.

== Ecology ==
Several New York State species of concern — the blue-spotted, Jefferson's and marbled salamanders — have found habitat dependent on the brook. Indiana bats, a federal endangered species, use trees near it as roosting sites and have been found to forage in it. The Eastern box, wood and spotted turtles also make their homes in and near the brook.
