= Walden Veterans' Memorial Bridge =

Bridge carrying New York Route 52 over the Wallkill River in Walden

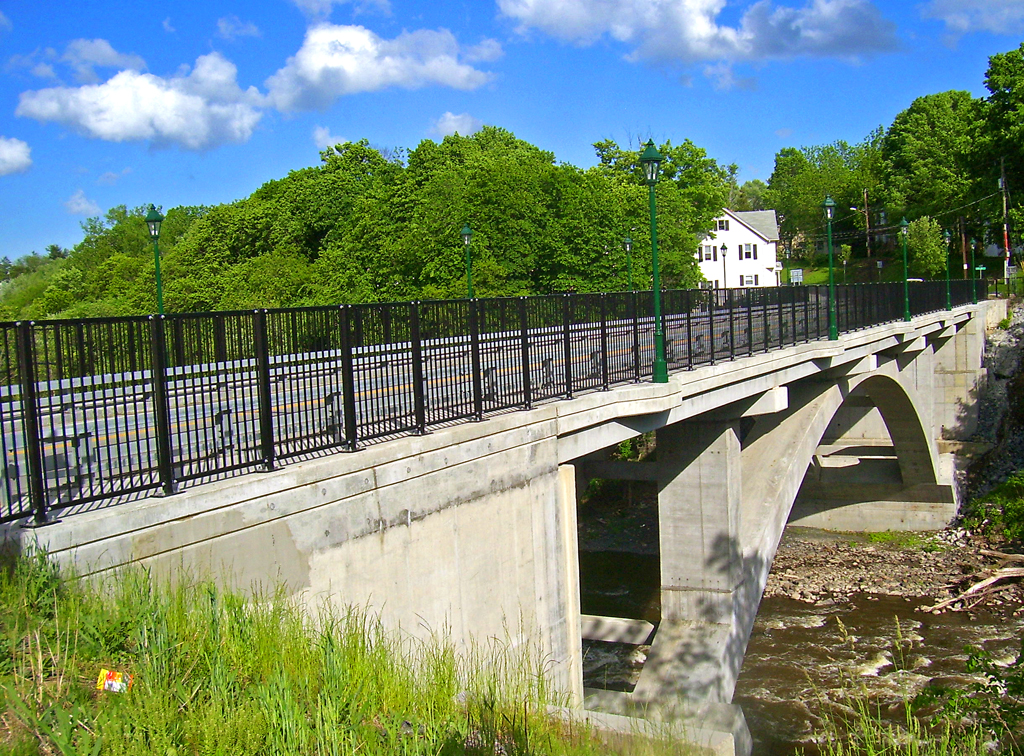
- The Walden Veterans' Memorial Bridge, known informally as the Walden High Bridge
- Coordinates: 41°33′40″N 74°11′41″W
- Carries: Two lanes of NY 52
- Crosses: Wallkill River
- Locale: Walden, New York
- Maintained by: New York State Department of Transportation
- ID number: 000000001026680

Characteristics
- Design: Open spandrel concrete arch
- Total length: 225 feet (69 m)
- Width: 43 feet (13 m)

History
- Opened: 2005

Statistics
- Daily traffic: 10,929

The Walden Veterans' Memorial Bridge, sometimes referred as the Walden High Bridge, from its predecessor, carries NY 52 over the Wallkill River in the Orange County village of Walden, New York, United States. It is the more heavily used of the two bridges in the village.

The current bridge was built between 2003 and 2005 when its predecessor, a steel truss bridge built in the 1920s, had to be completely torn down due to severe deterioration of the support foundations. While construction was underway, traffic on Route 52 was diverted down Oak Street to the Walden Low Bridge. The new bridge features some architectural improvements, such as lighting and wide sidewalks on both sides.

The bridge was officially renamed in honor of the village's war veterans under state law passed in 2004. Banners naming individual residents and commemorating their service flutter from the decorative lampposts along the bridge.
