= St. Andrew's Cemetery (Walden, New York) =

Historic cemetery in New York, United States

- U.S. National Register of Historic Places
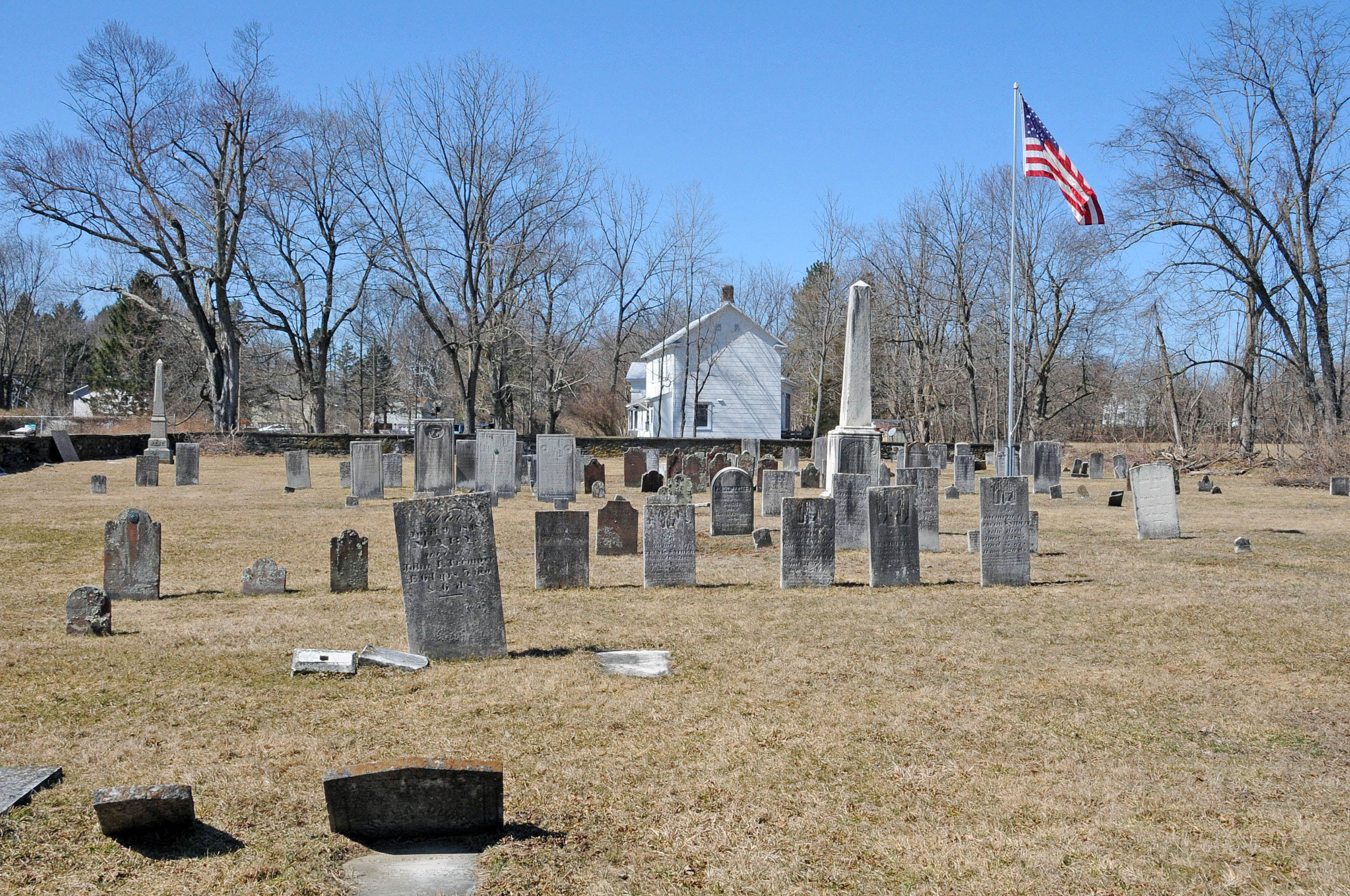

- Location within New York Location within the United States
- Location: St. Andrew's Rd. and Plains Rd., Walden, New York
- Coordinates: 41°34′8″N 74°8′44″W
- Area: 0.0 acres (0 ha)
- NRHP reference No.: 08001232
- Added to NRHP: December 23, 2008

St. Andrew's Cemetery is a historic cemetery located at Walden in Orange County, New York.

It was listed on the National Register of Historic Places in 2010.
