= Lake Mohawk, New Jersey =

Populated place in Sussex County, New Jersey, US

- Census-designated place
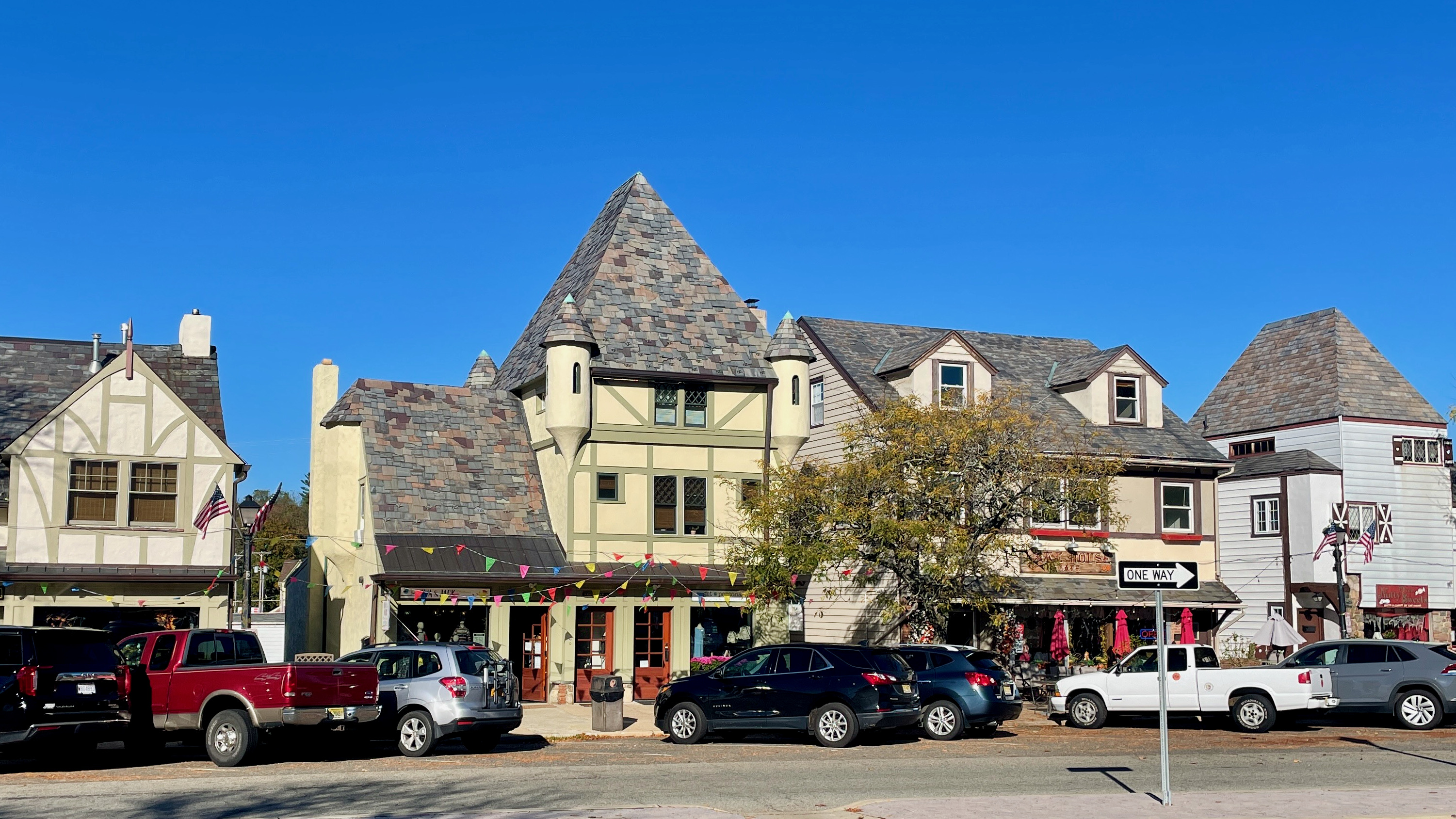
- White Deer Plaza Business District

- Map of Lake Mohawk in Sussex County. Inset: Location of Sussex County in New Jersey.

- Location in Sussex County Location in New Jersey Location in the United States
- Coordinates: 41.012138°N 74.672558°W
- Country: United States
- State: New Jersey
- County: Sussex
- Established: 1927

Government Lake Mohawk Country Club
  - Type: Board of Trustees
  - Board President: Victoria Germano

Area
  - Total: 6.19 sq mi (16.03 km^{2})
  - Land: 5.02 sq mi (13.00 km^{2})
  - Water: 1.17 sq mi (3.03 km^{2}) 18.91%
- Elevation: 869 ft (265 m)

Population (2020)
  - Total: 9,759
  - Density: 1,943.6/sq mi (750.4/km^{2})
- Time zone: UTC−05:00 (Eastern (EST))
  - Summer (DST): UTC−04:00 (Eastern (EDT))
- Area codes: 862/973
- FIPS code: 34-15610
- GNIS feature ID: 02389370

Lake Mohawk is an unincorporated residential development and census-designated place (CDP) split between Byram Township and Sparta Township, in Sussex County, in the U.S. state of New Jersey. As of the 2020 census, Lake Mohawk had a population of 9,759.

== Geography ==
According to the United States Census Bureau, the CDP had a total area of 6.172 square miles (15.987 km^{2}), including 5.005 square miles (12.964 km^{2}) of land and 1.167 square miles (3.023 km^{2}) of water (18.91%).

The community is located largely within the township of Sparta, with a portion located in Byram Township.

== History ==
In 1924 tributary streams and natural springs of the Wallkill River were impounded at the northern end of Brogden Meadow in Sussex County. The Arthur D. Crane Company, a real estate development venture in partnership with Herbert Closs, acquired 2,600 ha (6,400 acres) of farmland. In 1926, Brogden Meadow was cleared and work started on a dam that would create Lake Mohawk. The dam was completed August 1926. It took until 1928 for water to fill the lake which now drains into the Wallkill River.

== Community ==
The community is located around Lake Mohawk, the largest artificial body of water in the state of New Jersey that is a private lake. There is the main lake in the mountains of the community and the Alpine Pool, both of which are spring fed. The water for the Alpine Pool cascades down gracefully from a spring that rises from an even higher peak in the mountains. An alpine motif was used throughout the community.

The buildings in the tiny town center resemble little castles, or reflect an alpine architectural style. This distinctive architecture in the town center and of many homes was a major aspect of the listing of Lake Mohawk on the National Register of Historic Places. The town center has restaurants, a post office, and limited shop, service, or professional space. This area is called White Deer Plaza after a Native American who lent her name to the center. A tiered boardwalk was constructed along the northern edge of the lake where the town center exists. A country club dominates the boardwalk near the dam.

In the 1950s a movie theater, a stone's throw beyond the main entrance to the lake, called Winona Parkway, was built along the adjacent county roadway, route 15, which leads to the Dutch colonial and revolutionary era mining town of Sparta.

Except for the Alpine Pool and the main lake areas that are accessible from an entrance high in the mountains, all of the community is reached by descending from the surrounding mountains of Sussex County. Homes have been built up each face of the enclosing mountains, but the roads to them are accessed only from the main road around the lake. From the Alpine Pool, a panoramic view of the county is possible. On one side almost the entire stretch of the main lake is visible and on the other, the mountains that reach into the states of Pennsylvania and New York.

At the southern end of the lake is a swimming pool and tennis complex originally called the "Marine Pool", that is constructed to resemble the deck of an ocean liner. It is modeled after the likes of SS Normandie, having all of the appointments of a cruise ship, with a galley motif for the restaurant and a great stand of stadium seating with colorful backs for the spectators at swimming events held at the facility. Through the seating is a stairway to the captain's quarters where the managers and lifeguards have quarters and stow special equipment.

The pool is ozone filtered, without a drop of chlorine in the water, and was the first pool in the United States to use corona discharge (CD) ozone to treat its water. The filter system, built in 1937, was designed to resemble the engine room of the ship. The pool is Olympic-size (50 m, with eight lanes) and has a central tower for diving events. The depth of the pool at that portion is ten feet. Both ends of the pool are more shallow, with a kiddie section nearest the tennis courts. On the northern end of the pool near the galley, there used to be a giant water slide that had been featured in television commercials for Zest soap in the 1960s. Beyond the pool to the south are three asphalt tennis courts, with another set of three clay courts in the parking area.

Swimming events at the pool are AAU competitions in all aquatic categories. Celebrities such as Buster Crabbe and Esther Williams were normal fare at the events in the 1940s and 1950s. This was a time when the youngsters of the community could hitch-hike rides along the road from their neighbors without concern.

In the 1940s and 1950s there was an "Indian village" with a souvenir shop, located along the opposite shore of the southern end of the lake that added another attraction depicted in postcards of the day. The development of Lake Mohawk was referred to as a "reservation" in most promotional materials to continue the Indian tribe imagery.

Many of the homes along the water have boathouses and docks. Sail boats and motor boats are a popular way to get around the lake. The "Marine Base", a marina built in the style of the country club, is located at a midpoint along the lake on the eastern shore.

The community used to be composed of summer residences. Few lived there around the year. Many houses were not insulated, nor did they have heating beyond a fireplace for especially cool summer nights. Among those who stayed year round, friends would be hosted for the snowy holidays and winter sports. Driving across the frozen lake was shorter and safer than trying to traverse the steep hills. Even delivery trucks would make the short trip across the ice.

The seasonal residents of the early years included many who showed horses in the English-style regional circuits. Hunters, open-jumpers, and three- and five-gated saddle horses competed in the events. The Lake Mohawk Horse Show drew competitors from New York and Pennsylvania as well as New Jersey. The professional photographer who traveled from show to show along with the competitors throughout the season, maintained his office in Lake Mohawk at a little castle structure opposite the club house. Photographs of the competitors, judges, and winners were available from his files, selected from proofs sent to the subjects or from displays he set up at later shows.

The route to Lake Mohawk was a winding drive up and down through a shady rural and mountainous roadside until after the completion of Interstate Highways connecting the area to the New York metropolitan area. After those high speed connections were established nearby into the county, the community took on a year-round population of entertainers, airline employees and pilots, as well as commuters.

=== Lake Mohawk Golf Club ===
The Arthur D Crane company set aside 125 acres in the 1920s for a golf course within the Lake Mohawk Community. The first nine holes opened on August 30, 1929. Architect Irving Sewall designed the course. In the 1930s the course converted into private membership and remains separate from the larger reservation. Today the golf course offers a Par 70 18 hole course and has a full-length driving range, practice green, and clubhouse.

=== Lake Mohawk Yacht Club ===
Burgee of Lake Mohawk Yacht Club.

Incorporated in 1938, the club is a private yacht club located in Sparta Township, New Jersey, on Lake Mohawk. Sailing was taking place as an organized activity on the lake as early as 1933. Lake Mohawk Country Club members Charles Gabor and Morgan Reichner decided to adopt the Snipe as the most suitable boat for the lake, and the Snipe fleet (number 10) was chartered on January 23, 1934, by the Snipe Class International Racing Association (SCIRA). In 1938, Charles Gabor won for the fleet the Commodore Hub E. Isaacks Trophy and by 1939 there were fifty-two Snipes in the fleet. In 1940, Kenneth Heitman won the National Junior Championship.

Soon after the Snipes came the Lightnings, another historical fleet chartered by the International Lightning Class Association (ILCA) as fleet #25.

== Lake ==
Lake Mohawk
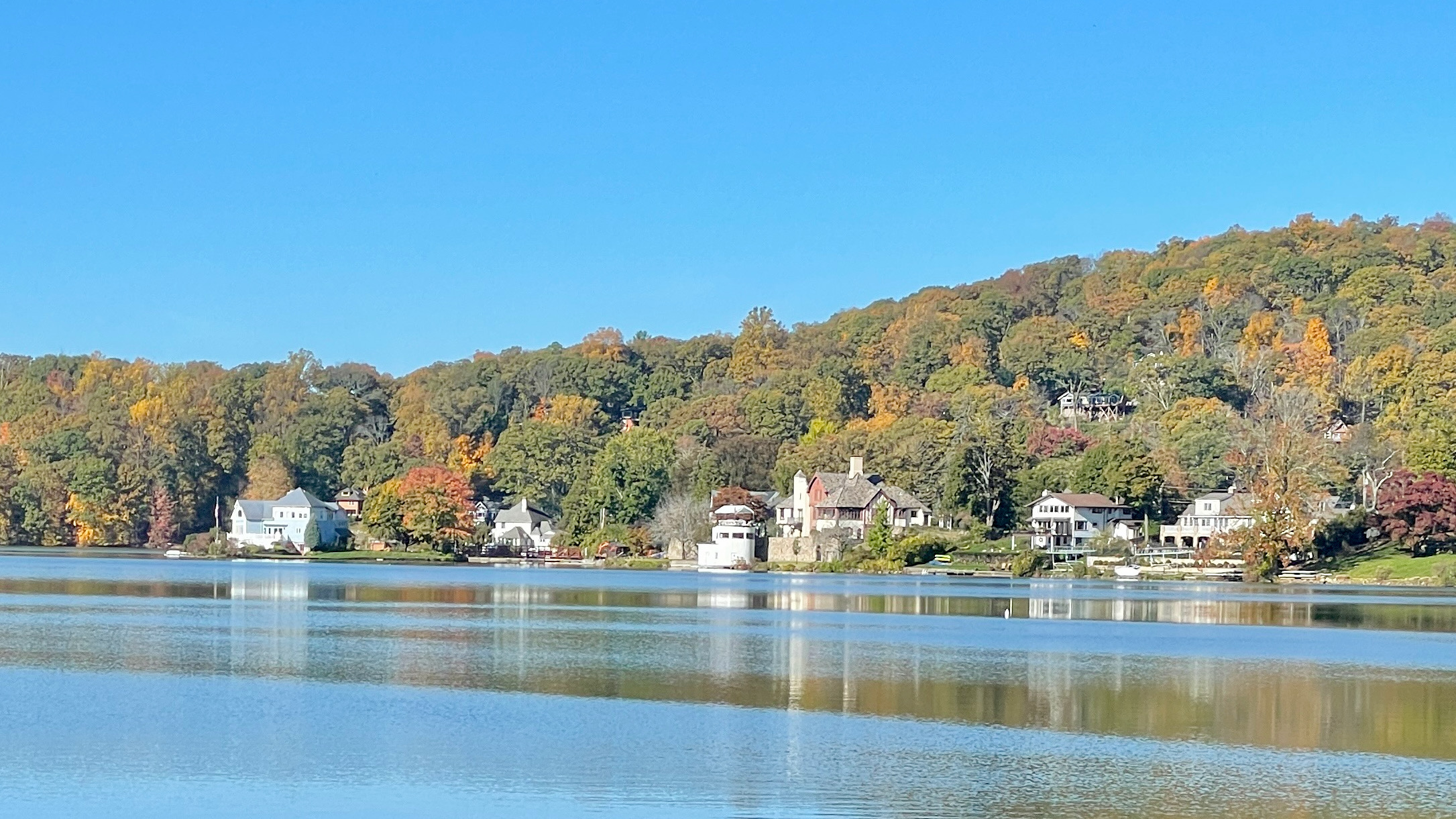
- Lake shore view

- Location within Sussex County, New Jersey Location within New Jersey Location within the United States
- Location: Sussex County, New Jersey
- Coordinates: 41°0′52″N 74°39′46″W
- Lake type: Reservoir
- Primary outflows: Wallkill River
- Surface area: 800 acres (320 ha)
- Surface elevation: 725 ft (221 m)

Lake Mohawk is an 800-acre (320 ha) reservoir located primarily in Sparta Township and extending into Byram Township of Sussex County, New Jersey. It is the source of the Wallkill River, which then flows north to Rondout Creek in New York. In 1924, the Arthur D. Crane Company acquired 2,600 acres (1,100 ha) of land at the headwaters of the river. This area was previously known as "Brogden's Meadow." A 600-foot dam on the Wallkill River was begun in 1926. The lake was filled in 1928. The dam was privately constructed by the developers Arthur D. Crane and Herbert L. Closs. They controlled the development, sales, and rentals of the entire community.

Soon after the construction of the lake, in the mid- to late 1930s, one of the architects was staying with his family in a seaplane on the lake. A fire broke out on the seaplane. While they escaped by boat, the plane sank to the bottom of the lake. In the late 1990s an Italian team attempted salvage, but according to their reports, the wreck was too deteriorated to be recovered.

== Historic district ==
- White Deer Plaza and Boardwalk District
- U.S. National Register of Historic Places
- U.S. Historic district
- New Jersey Register of Historic Places
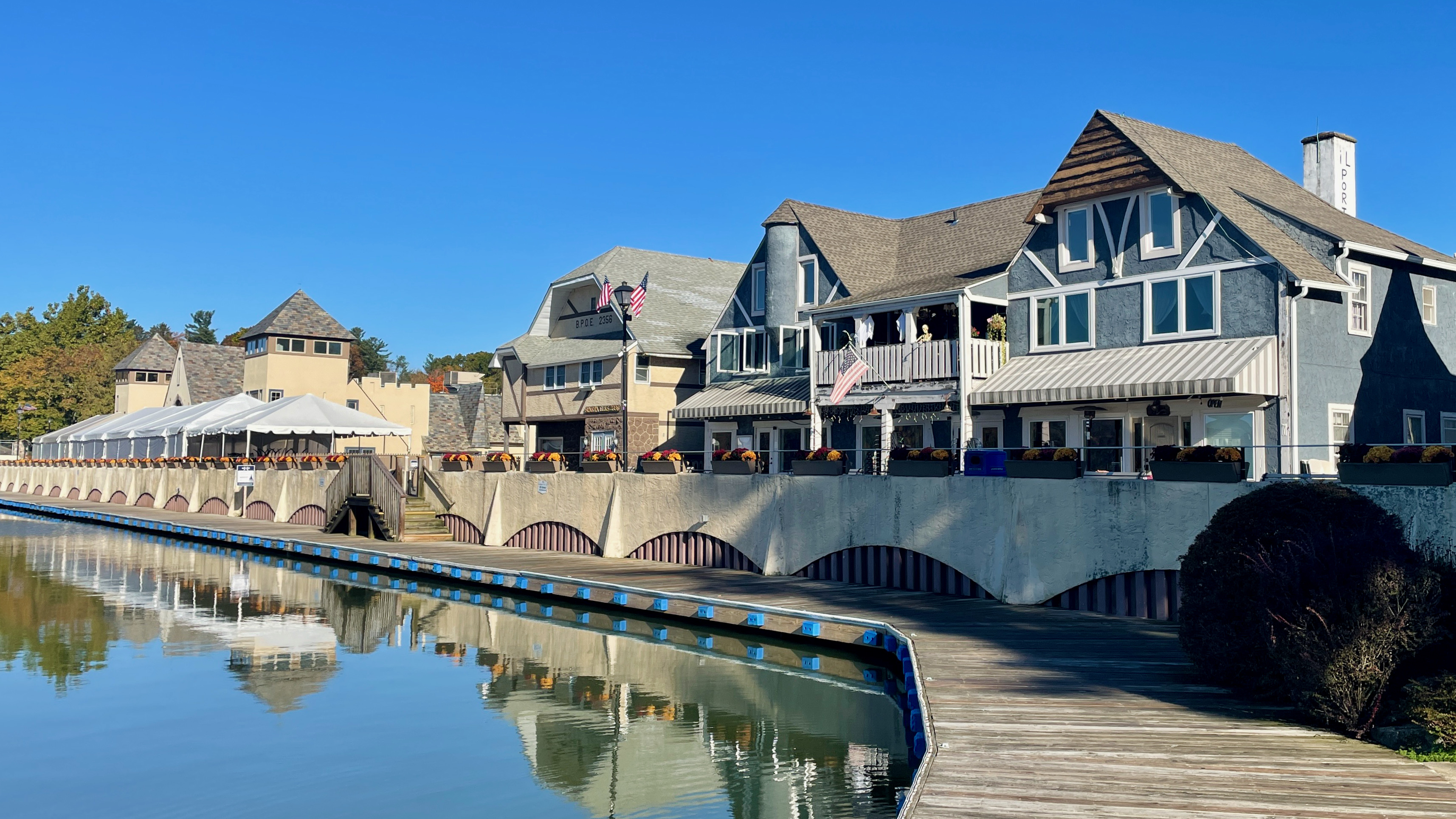
- Boardwalk by Lake Mohawk
- Location: White Deer Plaza, Winona Parkway, and West Shore Trail
- Area: 13 acres (5.3 ha)
- Architectural style: Tudor Revival, Lake Mohawk Tudor
- NRHP reference No.: 88001012
- NJRHP No.: 2630

Significant dates
- Added to NRHP: July 11, 1988
- Designated NJRHP: May 25, 1988

The White Deer Plaza and Boardwalk District is a 13-acre (5.3 ha) historic district encompassing the Lake Mohawk section of Sparta Township along White Deer Plaza, Winona Parkway, and West Shore Trail. It was added to the National Register of Historic Places on May 25, 1988 for its significance in architecture, commerce, and community planning. The district includes 18 contributing buildings, 8 contributing structures, and one contributing site.

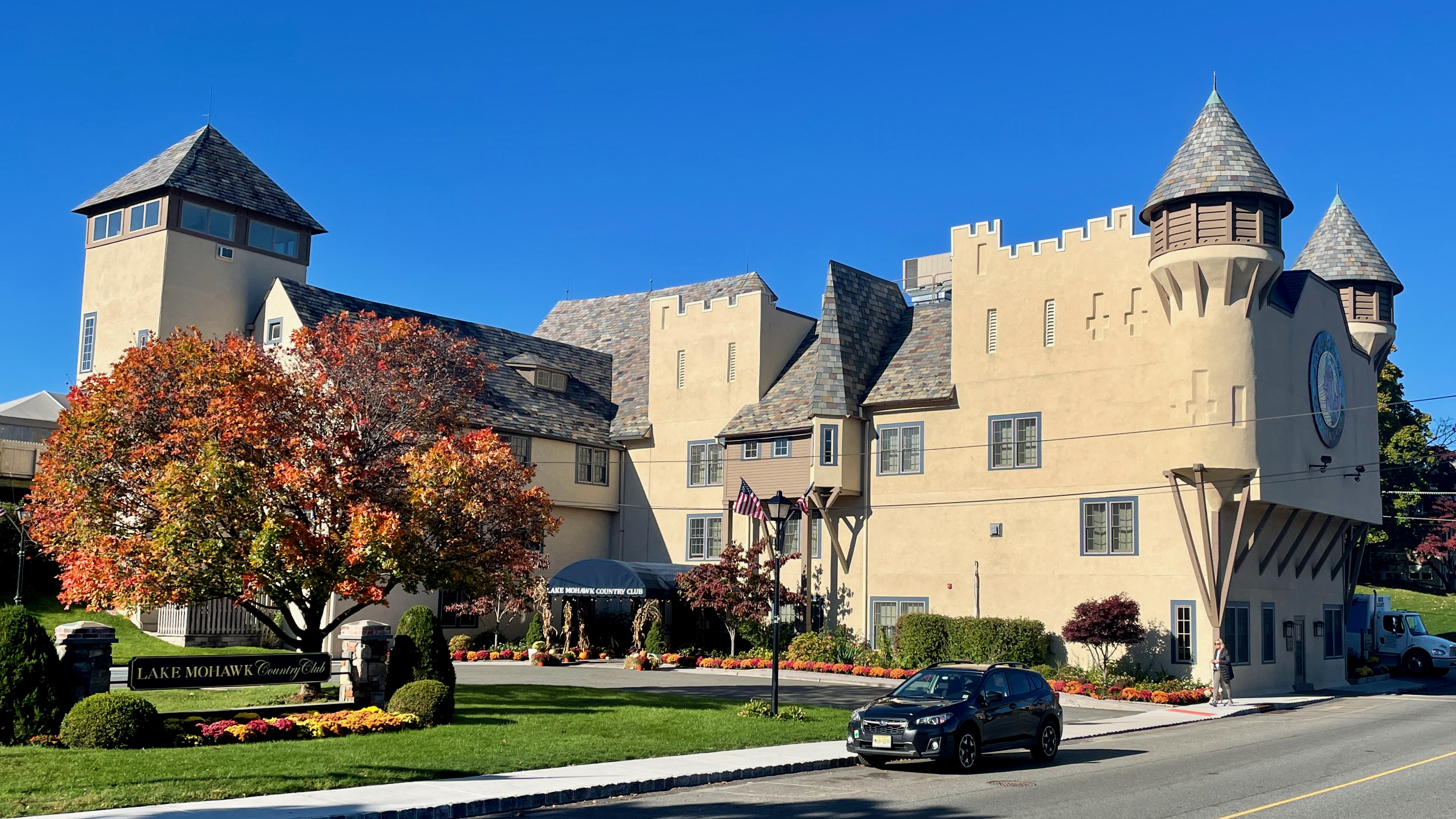
Lake Mohawk Country Club

== Demographics ==
Historical population
Census	Pop.	Note	%±
1950	1,873		—
1960	4,647		148.1%
1970	6,262		34.8%
1980	8,498		35.7%
1990	8,930		5.1%
2000	9,755		9.2%
2010	9,916		1.7%
2020	9,759		−1.6%
Population sources: 1960-1980; 1950 1960 1970; 1980 1990 2000; 2010 2020

Lake Mohawk was listed as an unincorporated community in the 1950 U.S. census; and then as a census designated place in the 1980 U.S. census.

=== Racial and ethnic composition ===
Lake Mohawk CDP, New Jersey – Racial and ethnic composition Note: the US Census treats Hispanic/Latino as an ethnic category. This table excludes Latinos from the racial categories and assigns them to a separate category. Hispanics/Latinos may be of any race.
Race / Ethnicity (NH = Non-Hispanic)	Pop 2000	Pop 2010	Pop 2020	% 2000	% 2010	% 2020
White alone (NH)	9,269	9,115	8,453	95.02%	91.92%	86.62%
Black or African American alone (NH)	35	53	94	0.36%	0.53%	0.96%
Native American or Alaska Native alone (NH)	8	5	6	0.08%	0.05%	0.06%
Asian alone (NH)	108	148	165	1.11%	1.49%	1.69%
Native Hawaiian or Pacific Islander alone (NH)	4	0	1	0.04%	0.00%	0.01%
Other race alone (NH)	5	8	41	0.05%	0.08%	0.42%
Mixed race or Multiracial (NH)	79	114	308	0.81%	1.15%	3.16%
Hispanic or Latino (any race)	247	473	691	2.53%	4.77%	7.08%
Total	9,755	9,916	9,759	100.00%	100.00%	100.00%

=== 2020 census ===
As of the 2020 census, Lake Mohawk had a population of 9,759. The median age was 45.9 years. 21.2% of residents were under the age of 18 and 19.4% were 65 years of age or older. For every 100 females, there were 92.8 males, and for every 100 females age 18 and over there were 88.7 males age 18 and over.

98.5% of residents lived in urban areas, while 1.5% lived in rural areas.

There were 3,744 households, of which 31.6% had children under the age of 18 living in them. Of all households, 60.3% were married-couple households, 11.3% were households with a male householder and no spouse or partner present, and 23.6% were households with a female householder and no spouse or partner present. About 22.7% of all households were made up of individuals and 13.1% had someone living alone who was 65 years of age or older.

There were 4,115 housing units, of which 9.0% were vacant. The homeowner vacancy rate was 2.2% and the rental vacancy rate was 6.0%.

=== 2010 census ===
The 2010 United States census counted 9,916 people, 3,768 households, and 2,769 families in the CDP. The population density was 1,981.1 per square mile (764.9/km^{2}). There were 4,100 housing units at an average density of 819.1 per square mile (316.3/km^{2}). The racial makeup was 95.91% (9,510) White, 0.61% (60) Black or African American, 0.05% (5) Native American, 1.52% (151) Asian, 0.00% (0) Pacific Islander, 0.44% (44) from other races, and 1.47% (146) from two or more races. Hispanic or Latino of any race were 4.77% (473) of the population.

Of the 3,768 households, 35.9% had children under the age of 18; 62.9% were married couples living together; 7.3% had a female householder with no husband present and 26.5% were non-families. Of all households, 22.4% were made up of individuals and 11.4% had someone living alone who was 65 years of age or older. The average household size was 2.62 and the average family size was 3.12.

26.4% of the population were under the age of 18, 5.6% from 18 to 24, 22.3% from 25 to 44, 32.1% from 45 to 64, and 13.7% who were 65 years of age or older. The median age was 42.7 years. For every 100 females, the population had 92.3 males. For every 100 females ages 18 and older there were 90.3 males.

=== 2000 census ===
As of the 2000 United States census there were 9,755 people, 3,692 households, and 2,787 families residing in the CDP. The population density was 1,951.2 inhabitants per square mile (753.4/km^{2}). There were 3,940 housing units at an average density of 788.1 per square mile (304.3/km^{2}). The racial makeup of the CDP was 96.88% White, 0.38% African American, 0.09% Native American, 1.11% Asian, 0.04% Pacific Islander, 0.44% from other races, and 1.06% from two or more races. Hispanic or Latino of any race were 2.53% of the population.

There were 3,692 households, out of which 38.2% had children under the age of 18 living with them, 66.9% were married couples living together, 6.8% had a female householder with no husband present, and 24.5% were non-families. 20.8% of all households were made up of individuals, and 10.1% had someone living alone who was 65 years of age or older. The average household size was 2.64 and the average family size was 3.09.

In the CDP the population was spread out, with 27.7% under the age of 18, 4.1% from 18 to 24, 30.3% from 25 to 44, 27.2% from 45 to 64, and 10.8% who were 65 years of age or older. The median age was 39 years. For every 100 females, there were 92.9 males. For every 100 females age 18 and over, there were 91.1 males.

The median income for a household in the CDP was $81,699, and the median income for a family was $95,621. Males had a median income of $72,279 versus $40,417 for females. The per capita income for the CDP was $35,637. About 0.8% of families and 1.7% of the population were below the poverty line, including 0.8% of those under age 18 and 3.4% of those age 65 or over.

== Sources ==
- Pierson, Duane. Images of Sparta, Minisink Press, Inc., 1981
