= Valley Central School District =

School district in New York, United States

Address
- 944 State Route 17K Montgomery, New York, 12549; United States

District information
- Type: Public
- Grades: K–12
- NCES District ID: 3619680

Students and staff
- Students: 4,101
- Teachers: 357.07 (FTE)
- Staff: 351.03 (FTE)
- Student–teacher ratio: 11.49

Other information
- Website: www.vcsd.k12.ny.us

The Valley Central School District serves most of the Town of Montgomery in Orange County, New York, United States, and its three villages: Maybrook, Montgomery and Walden. Students also come from adjacent areas of the towns of Newburgh, Crawford, Wallkill, Hamptonburgh, and New Windsor. A small portion of Ulster County's Town of Shawangunk also sends students to this district. There is also another school named Valley Central Public School in Thunder Bay, Ontario, Canada.

It operates six schools:

== Berea Elementary School ==
Berea Elementary School (BES) is one of the Valley Central School District’s four elementary schools, serving grades K–5. The school is located at 946 State Route 17K in Montgomery, New York.

=== History ===
Berea Elementary was added by the district in 1969 amid rising elementary enrollment, and the building was dedicated in November of that year. The school marked its 50th anniversary during the 2019–2020 school year.

=== Campus ===
Berea sits along NY-17K; the district’s Central Registration Office and Administration Building are immediately behind the school at 944 State Route 17K.

=== Academics and enrollment ===
As of the 2023–24 school year, Berea Elementary enrolled approximately 500 students in kindergarten through fifth grade, according to New York State Education Department data.

== East Coldenham Elementary School ==
East Coldenham Elementary School (ECES) is one of the Valley Central School District’s four elementary schools, located at 286 State Route 17K in the Town of Newburgh, New York. It serves grades K–5; in 2023–24 the school enrolled 312 students, per federal education data.

The school opened in 1960. On November 16, 1989, a severe wind event associated with a small tornado/downburst collapsed a cafeteria wall during lunchtime. Roughly 120 students were inside; nine students were killed and eighteen were injured. A tenth child died days later in a traffic crash outside the school that officials linked to the disaster’s aftermath.

In the years after the tragedy, the cafeteria was rebuilt and the campus added a memorial garden and stone monument; the district holds an annual remembrance each November 16 that includes a moment of silence and flags at half-staff.

== Montgomery Elementary School ==
Montgomery Elementary School is located on Union Street (NY 211) in the village of Montgomery, New York, United States. It educates children from grades kindergarten through 5, most of them residents of the village or nearby sections of the Town of Montgomery.

It is a Colonial Revival-style brick building dating to the 1920s. When it was built it was the school for all ages in the village, but became an elementary school when the district was created in the late 1950s.

In 2008 it was named a high-performing/gap closing school under the reporting requirements of the No Child Left Behind Act. Fifth-graders go on to Valley Central Middle School. This school has 1 courtyard and a garden. It has 2 playgrounds 1 for grades K-2 and 1 for 3-5.

== Walden Elementary School ==
Walden Elementary School educates children from kindergarten through fifth grade in the village of the same name, and adjacent areas of the surrounding Town of Montgomery.

The building itself was opened in 1926 as the single school building for what was then the Walden School District, educating students of all grade levels from the village, a purpose still evident from the "Walden Grade-High School" entablature on the pediment above the four Corinthian order columns at the main entrance. When Valley Central was created from the merger of Walden and two neighboring districts in the late 1950s, it became just one of three (later five, now four) elementary schools in the district.

The school was at the center of a small controversy in 2007. On November 15, an employee at the school received a bomb threat in email. School officials locked down the building, letting police enter and confining students to their rooms until an hour after their normal dismissal time. Parents who had objected to the school's decision, and its failure to notify them, kept a quarter of the students home the next day as a protest. School district officials defended their actions as required by the situation.

== Valley Central Middle School ==
Valley Central Middle School (VCMS) serves grades 6–8 on the district’s main campus in Montgomery, New York, at 1189 State Route 17K. The middle school is physically connected to Valley Central High School via a later addition to the campus. As of 2023–24, VCMS enrolls roughly 950 students and draws from the district’s elementary schools. The school is led by principal Jayme Ginda-Baxter.

=== Academics ===
VCMS offers the standard New York State middle-level curriculum alongside electives and enrichment. The school also operates the Viking Academy, a STEAM-focused, project-based program designed for grade-8 students who benefit from an alternative setting while completing the same core requirements as their peers.

=== Student life and activities ===
Students have access to a range of after-school clubs and activities—including visual and performing arts, student government, and intramurals—and the school mounts an annual middle-school musical. Recent elective offerings have also included an esports team that scrimmages other middle schools.

=== Athletics ===
VCMS students participate in the district’s modified (middle-level) sports programs and may progress to junior varsity and varsity teams at the high school level.

== Valley Central High School ==
See Valley Central High School

== Other facilities ==
A seventh school, Maybrook Elementary School, closed in June 2013. It is now called the Alternative Learning Center and is used for special learning programs and other small parent enrichment programs. The District Office is located on the same property as Berea Elementary. All business office and Board of Education functions are performed there.
