= Walden, New York =

Village in New York, US

Walden
- Village
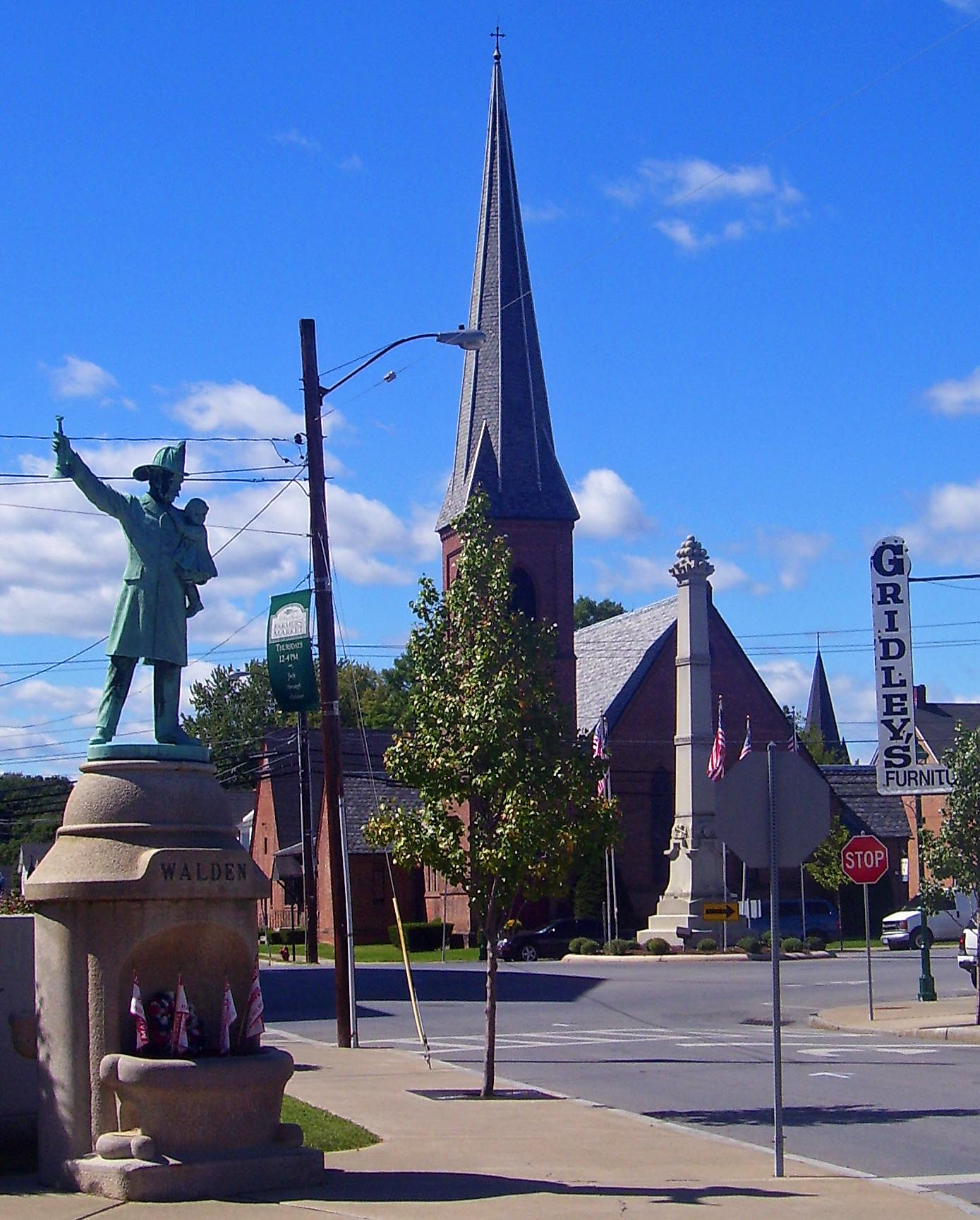
- Central Walden, with memorials and St. Andrew's Episcopal Church, in 2007

- Seal
- Etymology: From Jacob T. Walden
- Location in Orange County and the state of New York.

- Location of New York in the United States
- Coordinates: 41°33′36″N 74°11′23″W
- Country: United States
- State: New York
- County: Orange
- Town: Montgomery

Government
  - Body: Village board
  - Village manager: John Revella
  - Mayor: John Ramos

Area
  - Total: 2.08 sq mi (5.40 km^{2})
  - Land: 2.01 sq mi (5.20 km^{2})
  - Water: 0.073 sq mi (0.19 km^{2})
- Elevation: 260 ft (79 m)

Population (2020)
  - Total: 6,818
  - Density: 3,394.0/sq mi (1,310.43/km^{2})
- Time zone: UTC−5 (Eastern)
  - Summer (DST): UTC−4 (Eastern Daylight Time)
- ZIP Code: 12586
- Area code: 845
- Exchanges: 778, 787
- FIPS code: 36-77849
- Website: Village of Walden

Walden is the largest of three villages of the town of Montgomery in Orange County, New York, United States. The population was 6,818 at the 2020 census. It has the ZIP Code 12586 and the 778 telephone exchange within the 845 area code. Walden is part of the Kiryas Joel–Poughkeepsie–Newburgh metropolitan area as well as the larger New York metropolitan area.

The precursor to the village began in the early 18th century as a mill town along the Wallkill River. One miller, Jacob Walden, was so successful the village that incorporated in the mid-19th century took its name from him. Later, it would be the village's three knife manufacturers that brought it growth and prosperity. They are gone today, but other industrial concerns remain.

== History ==
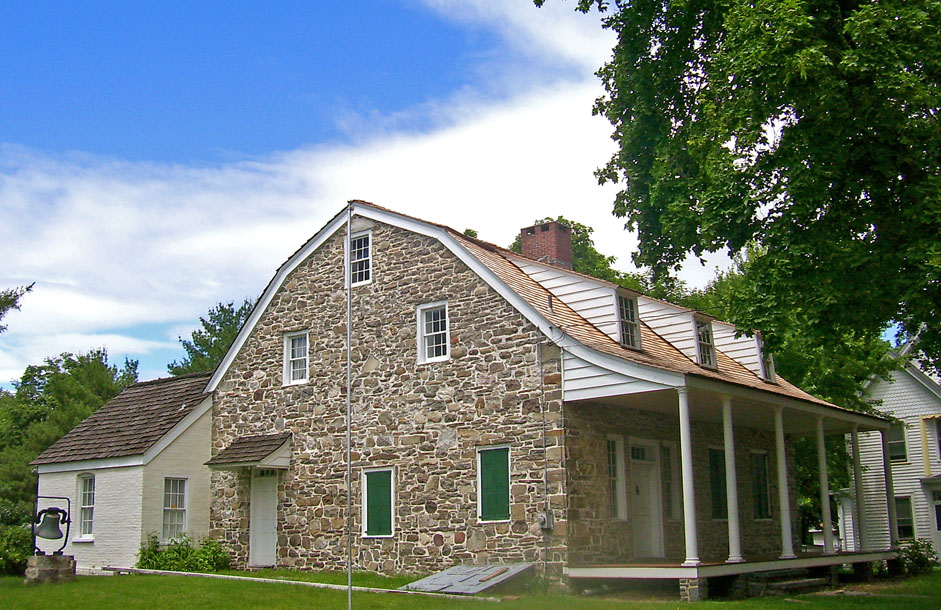
18th-century stone house Jacob Walden later lived in.

The first Europeans began to arrive in the region around the 1650s, and began establishing permanent settlements in the area by the early 18th century.

The area around present-day Walden was purchased in 1736 by Alexander Kidd, and settlers of Scots-Irish, English and German descent started arriving not long afterwards. It was the first settlement west of the Wallkill River, known at the time as Kidd's Town. In 1813, an entrepreneur from New York City named Jacob Treadwell Walden began purchasing land on both sides of the Wallkill River, with plans to develop a manufacturing settlement along the river. He convinced some of his business partners to finance the construction of wool mills on the river, attracted by the Great Falls as a source of power and the railroad connections at nearby Maybrook. He dammed the Wallkill above the falls, creating a power station that remains in use today, and his mill was a success. By the 1820s, his mill became a notable regional producer of cotton and woolen cloth. Wool-makers followed as the Industrial Revolution picked up steam and the growing population center became known instead as Walden's Mills. The area became a significant local producer of woolen products by the 1840s.

In 1855, Walden was formally incorporated as a village.

Most of Walden's wool industry failed a few decades after it began, and people in the village sought to replace the mills with a different source of employment. The village began encouraging knife manufacturers to relocate from nearby Dutchess County to vacant mills. In 1856, the New York Knife Company moved to an idle cotton factory in Walden. The company would go on to make much of the cutlery employed by the Union Army during the U.S. Civil War.

After the war, other knifemakers came to Walden. In the 1870s, the Walden Knife Company set up a factory in the village, and Schrade Cutlery built a factory in Walden in 1904. The village soon became colloquially known as "Little Sheffield" and "Knifetown". During this time, rail service arrived to Walden, facilitating passenger service and increased mobility for local manufactured goods. Other industrial concerns, making products as diverse as engines and women's underwear, also set up shop.

In the early 1890s, President Grover Cleveland lowered tariffs on many imported goods, including knives. Competitively priced German cutlery began to flood the American market, and together with the Panic of 1893 and the economic slowdown that followed for several years, the knife companies and their owners went heavily into debt and it looked for a while as if they might not survive.

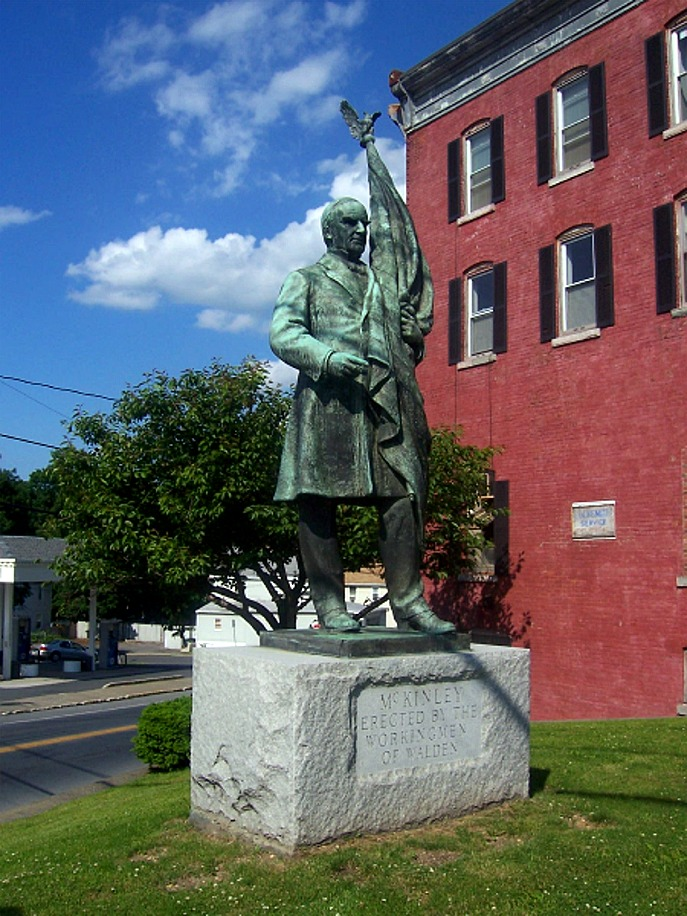
Statue of President McKinley in downtown Walden

But in 1897 President William McKinley, a personal friend of Thomas Wilson Bradley of the U.S. Knife Company, pushed through the Dingley Tariff that restored the status quo ante. The knifemakers returned to profitability and were able to pay off their debts; and in gratitude Bradley had a statue of McKinley erected that remains in Walden today.

Throughout the early 1900s, the village experienced a period of substantial growth. Dense mixed-used development flourished in the village's downtown, often taking form of residences above shops. Single-family homes also proliferated throughout the village, typically on relatively small lot sizes. During this time, numerous government buildings were constructed.

In the 1910s the facilities at the dam began to be primarily used for power and less for industry.

Walden's Main Street was the site of an active retail trade which included Millspaugh's Furniture as well as Roosa's Jewelers, both still in business. Lustig's Department Store, established by Carl Lustig in 1883, was the mainstay of Main Street until its closing in 1986.

The Depression was hard on many of the village's economic concerns, but the knifemakers persisted. However, after World War II they gradually became less prominent and moved as the rail connections they had depended on were replaced by trucking on the growing Interstate Highways. In 1957, Schrade Cutlery (renamed to Imperial Schrade) closed down its factory, and moved to nearby Ellenville. Schrade was the last company making knives in the village, and closed down its factory after a fire. It continued production in Ellenville until 2004. The ruins of the factory still stand behind the Thruway Markets hypermarket.

Apart from knifemaking, Walden became a regional center for the garment industry from the 1930s through the 1950s.

As car dependency increased in the region during the late 20th century, aided by the construction of the New York State Thruway system and Interstate 84, downtown businesses struggle to compete with car-oriented retail centers throughout the region.

Throughout the 1990s, the village was the subject of an ongoing joke by a disc jockey at the nearby WPDH-FM radio station, who would constantly joke about Walden being a poor, redneck, and inbred town. Some villagers interviewed by The New York Times on the matter claimed the long-running joke hurt their civic esteem, and even real estate values in the village.

From 1995 until 2016, Walden was the headquarters of the Big Apple Circus.

== Geography ==
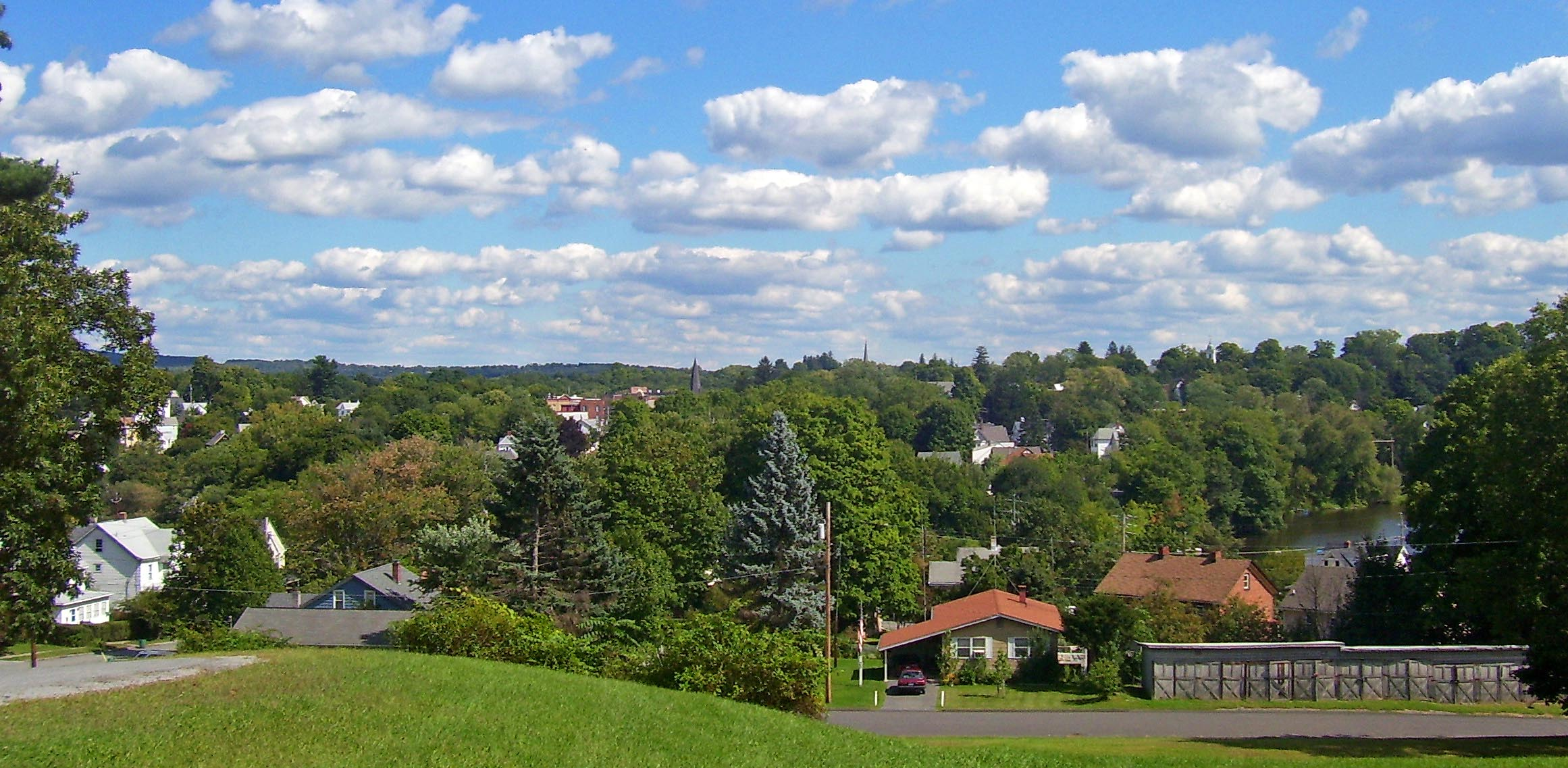
A view of Walden toward the northeast. Wallkill River is visible at right, with downtown in the center.

According to the United States Census Bureau, the village has a total area of 2.0 square miles (5.2 km^{2}), of which 2.0 square miles (5.2 km^{2}) is land and 0.1 square miles (0.26 km^{2}) (3.9%) is water.

The village's most notable geographical feature is the Wallkill River, which flows from the south to the north across the village and divides one-third of it from the rest. Within the eastern portion, Tin Brook, the Wallkill's major right tributary in New York, meanders across as well, forming part of the northern village boundary. There are two waterfalls and dams on the river within the village limits, known as the Great and Little Falls; and two auto bridges, the "high" (formally, the Walden Veterans' Memorial Bridge, which carries NY 52 through the village as West Main Street) and "low" (Oak Street) bridges).

The Wallkill passes through a small gorge between the two dams and loses approximately 60 feet (18 m) of elevation in the process. The surrounding topography in the village is, correspondingly, gentle rolling hills of this section of the Great Appalachian Valley between the higher rises of the Shawangunk Ridge, visible to the west from some sections of the village, and the Hudson Highlands to the southwest. The highest elevation is roughly 520 feet (160 m) above sea level along Overlook Road at the village's western boundary; the lowest is 260 feet (79 m) along the Wallkill at the northern village line.

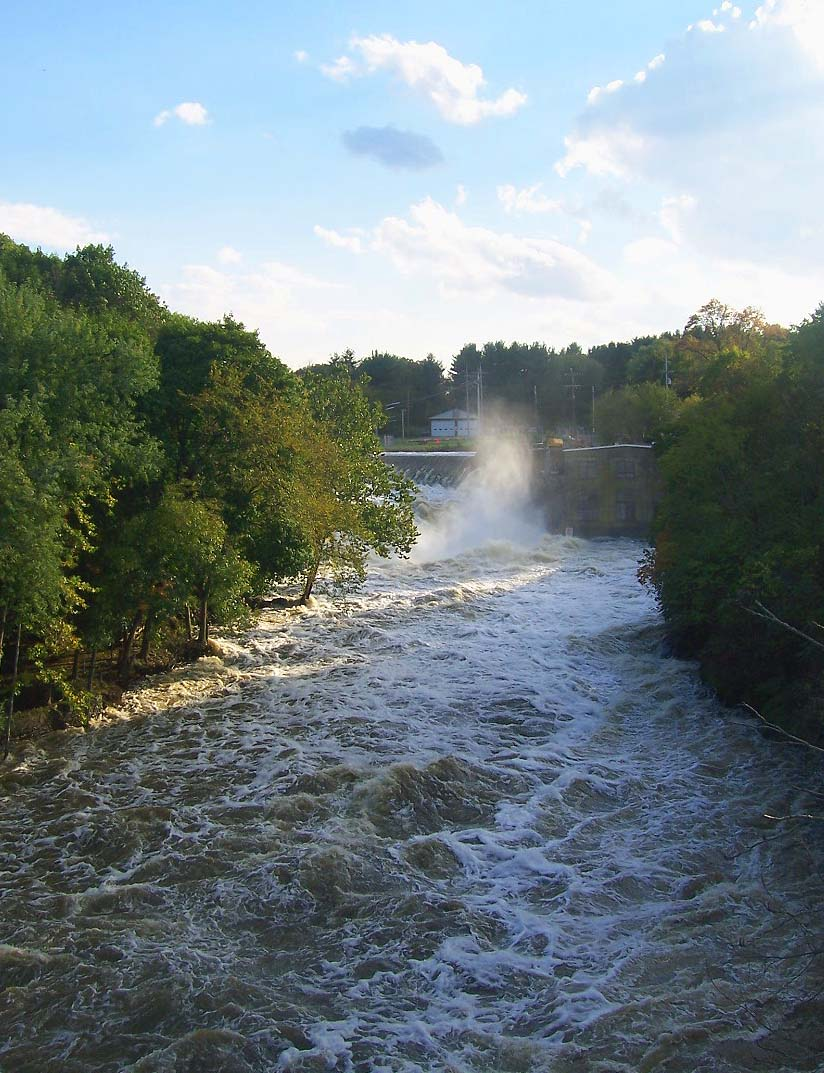
Great Falls and dam with power station, viewed from High Bridge after heavy rainfall in October 2005

Walden's growth began near the mills and later the knife-making plants, particularly the New York Knife Company, located on the steep east bank of the river just south of the Veterans' Memorial Bridge; the building's footings are still visible on the slope. The central business district of the village is today a few blocks to the east, along Main Street. Just to its south is the village hall and the main square. East Main Street, the section of 52 from the 208 junction to the village line, has seen many newer businesses locate there, including a small strip mall. There is also some scattered commercial presence along Orange Avenue (208 south of the junction), primarily professional office space. This parallels the village's remaining industrial presence along the railroad line to the east, which at its northern terminus abuts downtown to the southeast. Walden's other major commercial area is the Thruway Markets complex located along the river north of Oak Street, just south of the remains of the Walden Knife Company.

On the southern side of the village is the Fox Hill Bruderhof Community where about 250 community members live and work in their factories and the Plough Publishing House.

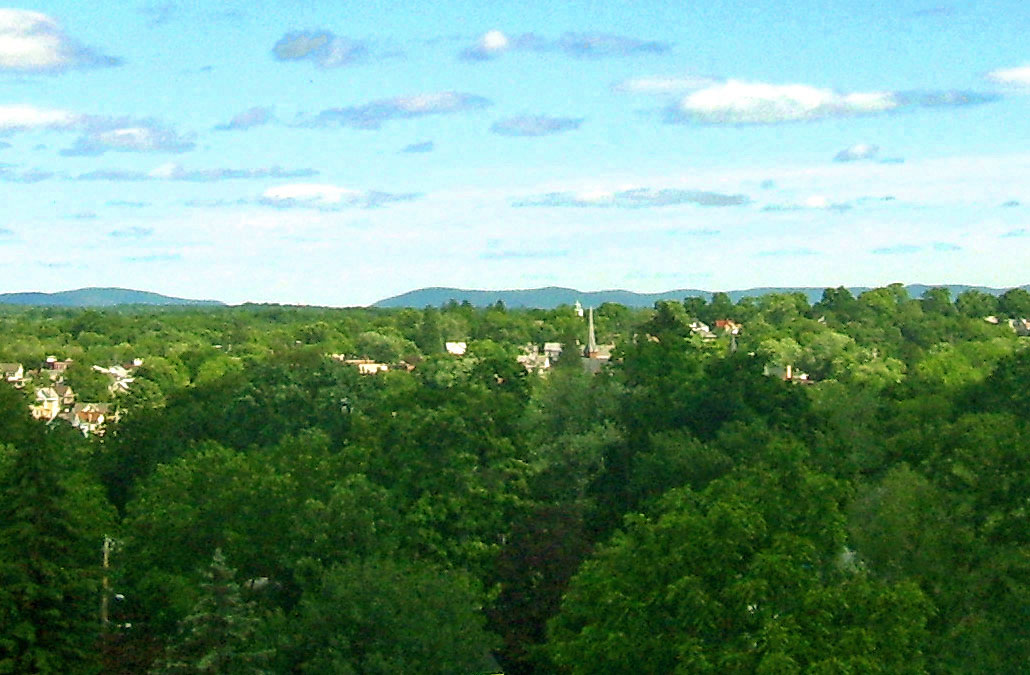
A view of Walden looking southeast toward the Hudson Highlands

There are two schools, public Walden Elementary School on Orchard Street and Most Precious Blood Catholic school near the northern village line along Ulster Avenue. The village includes public parks and a walking trail.

- Bradley Park - along Albany Avenue, on the high ground between Thruway Market and Ulster Avenue (Route 208), contains 4 baseball & 1 softball field (Home to the Walden Little League), 2 tennis courts, a playground, and a skateboard park.
- Wooster Grove - along East Main Street (Route 52), surrounded by the Tin Brook, offers a large playground, indoor & outdoor basketball courts, a bandstand, an ice rink; the village's teen center is also here.
- James Olley Park - at the end of Sherman Avenue, includes a manufactured beach with public swimming and fishing, a small playground, a picnic grove, unimproved walking trails, and a summer recreation camp.
- Alfred Place Park - the only park on the west side includes a small playground and basketball court.
- Walden–Wallkill Rail Trail - beginning at Woosters Grove, a 3.22-mile (5.18 km)-long paved walking and biking trail linking the village to the hamlet of Wallkill in Ulster County.

Much of the remainder of the village is residential, with houses tending from modest and small near downtown, the river and railroad, to more expansive homes (such as the Victorians along the west side of Ulster Avenue) being found on the hills, newer development near the southwestern and eastern borders with the town, and 6 small apartment and townhouse complexes.

A large tract along the river south of the power station had remained undeveloped until very recently. A small area between McKinley Avenue, South Mountgomery Street and the river remains open, used for NYSEG's purposes. On the other end of the village, the sewage treatment plant is also in the middle of an undeveloped area.

=== Climate ===
Walden has a humid continental climate, and tends to be significantly cooler than Manhattan, especially at night.

Climate data for Walden, New York (1981–2010 normals)
Month	Jan	Feb	Mar	Apr	May	Jun	Jul	Aug	Sep	Oct	Nov	Dec	Year
Mean daily maximum °F (°C)	34.0 (1.1)	37.6 (3.1)	46.4 (8.0)	59.0 (15.0)	69.6 (20.9)	78.1 (25.6)	82.5 (28.1)	81.1 (27.3)	73.7 (23.2)	62.3 (16.8)	50.9 (10.5)	38.8 (3.8)	59.5 (15.3)
Mean daily minimum °F (°C)	14.4 (−9.8)	16.9 (−8.4)	25.5 (−3.6)	36.3 (2.4)	46.0 (7.8)	55.5 (13.1)	60.0 (15.6)	58.5 (14.7)	49.9 (9.9)	37.8 (3.2)	30.5 (−0.8)	20.9 (−6.2)	37.7 (3.2)
Average precipitation inches (mm)	2.97 (75)	2.61 (66)	3.65 (93)	3.84 (98)	4.15 (105)	4.42 (112)	4.05 (103)	3.93 (100)	4.09 (104)	4.12 (105)	3.56 (90)	3.43 (87)	44.82 (1,138)
Average snowfall inches (cm)	13.3 (34)	10.6 (27)	8.1 (21)	1.3 (3.3)	0 (0)	0 (0)	0 (0)	0 (0)	0 (0)	0 (0)	1.3 (3.3)	8.9 (23)	43.6 (111)
Average precipitation days (≥ 0.01 in)	9.6	7.9	9.7	10.8	11.7	10.9	10.0	9.9	8.5	8.8	9.1	9.3	116.2
Average snowy days (≥ 0.1 in)	4.9	3.6	2.8	0.5	0	0	0	0	0	0	0.6	2.8	15.2
Source: NOAA

== Demographics ==
Historical population
Census	Pop.	Note	%±
1870	1,254		—
1880	1,804		43.9%
1890	2,132		18.2%
1900	3,147		47.6%
1910	4,004		27.2%
1920	5,493		37.2%
1930	4,283		−22.0%
1940	4,262		−0.5%
1950	4,559		7.0%
1960	4,851		6.4%
1970	5,277		8.8%
1980	5,659		7.2%
1990	5,836		3.1%
2000	6,164		5.6%
2010	6,978		13.2%
2020	6,818		−2.3%
U.S. Decennial Census 2020

As of the 2020 Census, there were 6,818 people living in 2,466 households in the village, giving it an average household size of 2.76. The population density was 3,325.6 inhabitants per square mile (1,284.0/km^{2}). There were There were 2,671 housing units, at an average density of 1,302.9 per square mile (503.1/km^{2}). The racial makeup of the village was 77.3% white, 13.7% African American, 2.9% Native American, 3.1% Asian, 0.2% Pacific Islander, 15.8% from other races, and 12.1% from two or more races. Hispanic or Latino of any race were 23.4% of the population. Per the 2022 American Community Survey five-year estimate, the majority of Walden's Hispanic or Latino is of Puerto Rican origin, whom account for 11.7% of Walden's total population.

Of the village's 2,466 households, 1,121 (45.5%) comprised married couples living together, 10.3% were cohabiting couples, 15.8% were male householders with no spouse, and 28.4% were female householders with no spouse. 23.1% of Walden's population was under 18 years old, and 12.9% was 65 year old and over. The median age was 36.2 years old. Walden has a sex ratio of 108.5 females per 100 males.

Per the 2022 American Community Survey five-year estimate, Walden has a median household income of $76,724, and a mean household income of $85,463. The median income for families in the village is $103,672, and the mean income for families is $106,984. 17.6% of Walden's population and 13.2% of Walden's families are below the poverty line. 22.9% of people under 18 years old, and 19.9% of people 65 years old and over live below the poverty line.

== Economy ==
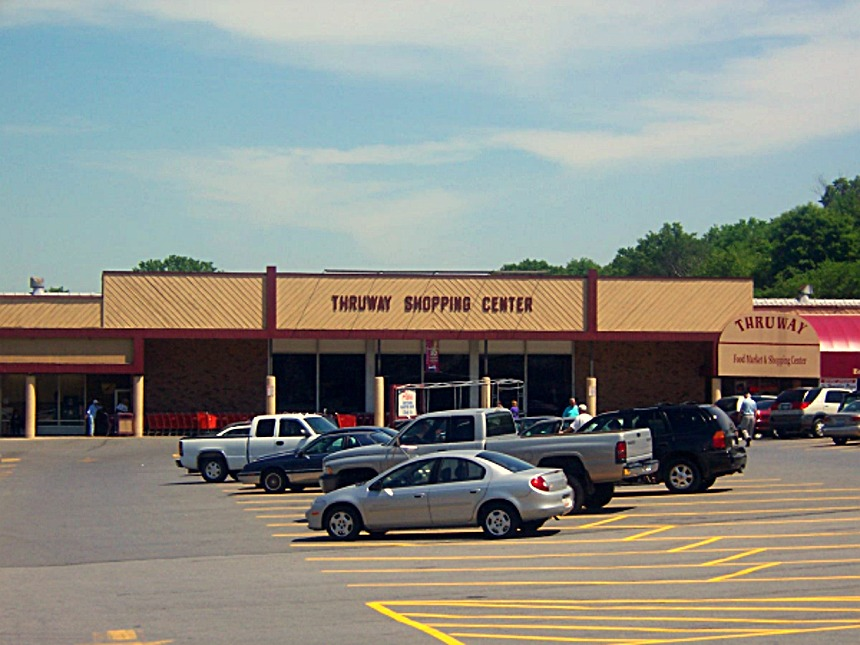
Thruway Markets

For 95 years, Walden was the home of Spence Engineering, a steam regulator manufacturer founded by Paulson Spence in 1926. He located his manufacturing facilities in Walden to serve the district steam heating loops in the northeast, especially ConEd in New York City. In 2019, Emerson Electric purchased Spence Engineering, ultimately moving it to Mexico in 2021 to improve their profitability.

The knife making plants are also gone, but other light-industrial concerns remain along the rail spur. The growing service sector is most strongly represented by two regional banks, Walden Federal and Walden Savings Bank, are based in the village (though the latter has moved to new headquarters at Scotts Corners, the 17K/208 intersection).

Retailing has long been a strong point for the village. The opening of Thruway Markets in 1955 filled the need not only for a supermarket but the entire big box sector, long before it existed in the country at large. While it eventually drove smaller stores from Main Street, it remains a substantial part of the village's tax base and a major draw for consumers from outside not only Walden but the Town of Montgomery (particularly the nearby hamlet of Wallkill, which has no large retailers of its own), despite the openings of chain supermarkets in several nearby communities.

While vacant space remains on Main Street, specialty stores and restaurants have managed to thrive there. Millspaugh Furniture, founded in Walden (but with another outlet in Poughkeepsie), is another popular draw for out-of-town shoppers due to its long history in the area and reputation for quality merchandise. National and regional chain stores once had little presence in Walden beyond two filling stations along the 52/208 section of Main Street, but in the last decade the amount of convenience stores has doubled.

Outside of jobs at the enterprises in the village, most residents work in the area. The nearby interstate and its associated "Golden Triangle" (with the New York State Thruway/I-87 and NY 17 (the future I-86) provide many jobs in transportation and distribution, particularly at Maybrook's Yellow Freight facility and the large Staples warehouse just north of I-84. Local government agencies, and some state ones such as the Department of Correctional Services, also employ residents. More recently, residents of the newer housing have been commuters traveling to jobs in New York City or other areas close to it.

== Government ==
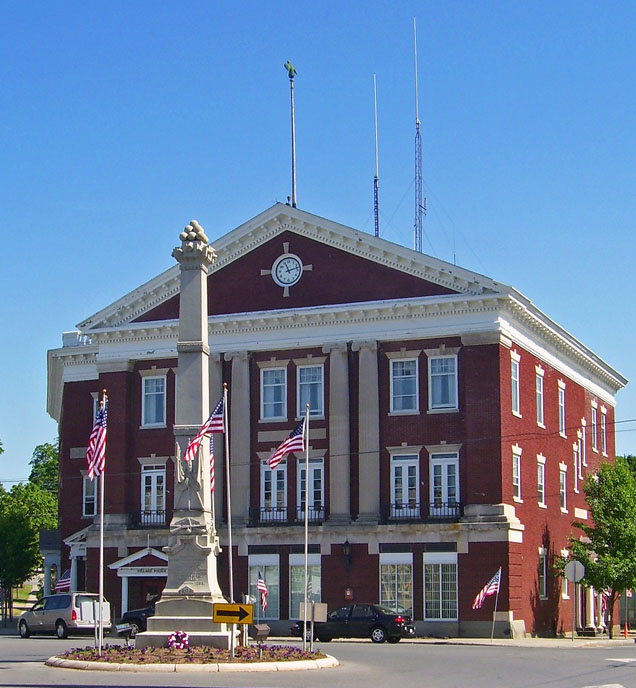
Walden's Village Hall, built in 1915. It houses the police department, village court and library in addition to government offices.

The village has seven elected officials, a village board consisting of the mayor and six nonpartisan trustees, per the New York State Village Law. Most of the executive functions are handled by the village manager, who serves at the board's pleasure. Walden has had this system of government since 1964. A 1972 referendum to return to a strong-mayor system was defeated.

== Education ==
It is in the Valley Central School District.

== Infrastructure ==
=== Services ===
The village has its own police force, which provides 24-hour protection for residents; a public works department which maintains roads, water and sewer lines; and a skate park; a recreation department which maintains parks within the village, including one with a pond in which swimming is permitted; and a village court presided over by an elected justice. Fire protection is provided for the village and surrounding fire district by the Walden Fire Department.

=== Transportation ===
Highways include Route 52 and NY 208.

The remaining spur of the old Wallkill Valley Railroad, now operated by Norfolk Southern, serves the village.

The Short Line bus serves Walden.
