= Maybrook, New York =

Maybrook
- Village
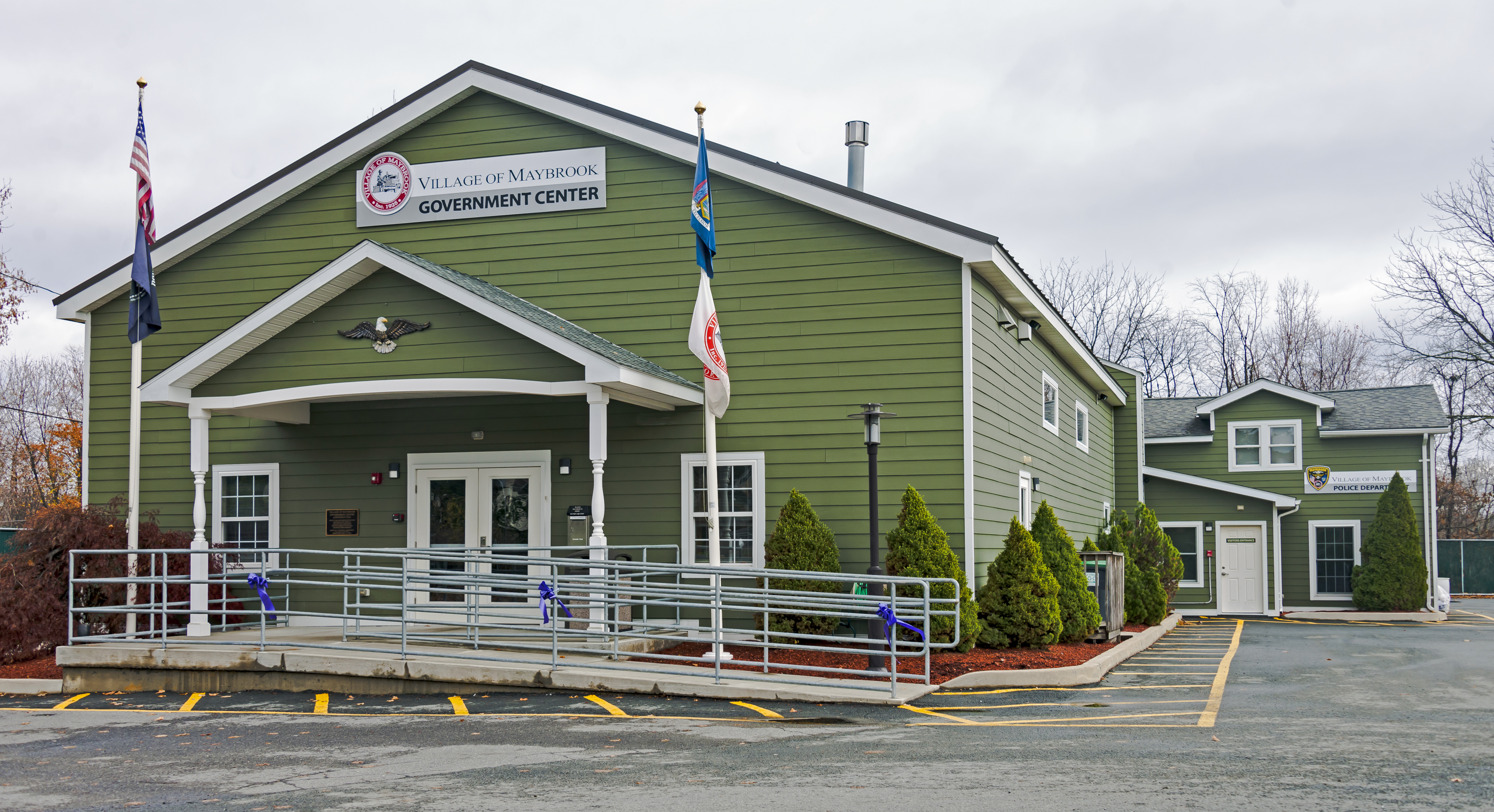
- Maybrook village hall in 2015

- Location of Orange County, New York (left) and of Maybrook in Orange County (right)

- Location of New York state in the United States
- Coordinates: 41°29′21″N 74°12′48″W
- Country: United States
- State: New York
- County: Orange
- Founded: 1926

Government
  - Mayor: Dennis K. Leahy (D)

Area
  - Total: 1.36 sq mi (3.52 km^{2})
  - Land: 1.36 sq mi (3.51 km^{2})
  - Water: 0.0039 sq mi (0.01 km^{2})
- Elevation: 420 ft (130 m)
- Highest elevation (Unnamed hill near west village line): 520 ft (160 m)
- Lowest elevation (Swampy area in northeast corner): 360 ft (110 m)

Population (2020)
  - Total: 3,150
  - Density: 2,326.0/sq mi (898.09/km^{2})
- Time zone: UTC-5 (Eastern (EST))
  - Summer (DST): UTC-4 (EDT)
- ZIP Code: 12543
- Area code: 845
- FIPS code: 36-46162
- GNIS feature ID: 0956701
- Wikimedia Commons: Maybrook, New York
- Website: villageofmaybrook.com

Maybrook is a village in Orange County, New York, United States. The population was 3,150 at the 2020 census. It is part of the Kiryas Joel-Poughkeepsie–Newburgh, NY Metropolitan Statistical Area as well as the larger New York–Newark–Bridgeport, NY-NJ-CT-PA Combined Statistical Area.

It is located mostly in the town of Montgomery, but a small portion is in the town of Hamptonburgh. It is also defined by the 427 telephone exchange in the 845 area code and the 12543 ZIP code, as well as its own eponymous fire district.

== Geography ==
Maybrook is located at 41°29′12″N 74°12′52″W (41.486660, −74.214463).

According to the United States Census Bureau, the village has a total area of 1.3 square miles (3.4 km^{2}), all land. The village is centered on NY 208, which runs through it for the village's two-mile (3.2 km) length in a northeast–southwest orientation, from the small extension in the Town of Hamptonburgh to its northern boundary. By contrast, it is only one mile wide at its widest point, near its south end, and even narrower to the north.

The village is mostly flat, rising up to hills on its western side. The summit of one is its highest elevation, at 520 feet (160 m) above sea level. Maybrook's lowest point is a swampy, undeveloped area in iterns northeast corner, 360 feet (110 m) in elevation.

=== Stewart Dairy Farm ===
In 1930 Thomas "Archie" Stewart, an early aviation enthusiast and descendant of prominent local dairy farmer Lachlan Stewart, convinced his uncle Samuel Stewart to donate "Stoney Lonesome", split between the towns of Newburgh and New Windsor, to the nearby city of Newburgh for use as an airport.

In the early 1970s, Governor Nelson Rockefeller's administration saw the potential for Stewart Airport to support the metropolitan area. Its long runway made it particularly attractive for intercontinental service via supersonic transport (SST), then under development in the U.S. and elsewhere. The Metropolitan Transportation Authority was the first government body to try to convert it into the New York metropolitan area's fourth major airport. It tripled the airport's territory, extending its land well beyond its previous western boundary at Drury Lane, a two-lane rural road. The state government used its eminent domain powers to take 7,500 acres (3,000 ha) for terminals, runways and a buffer zone expanding the airport from Newburgh into neighboring towns of Montgomery and a small portion of Hamptonburgh. The land was bounded by I-84 to the north, NY 207 along the south and roughly by Rock Tavern and Maybrook in the west.

== Demographics ==
Historical population
Census	Pop.	Note	%±
1930	1,159		—
1940	1,189		2.6%
1950	1,316		10.7%
1960	1,348		2.4%
1970	1,536		13.9%
1980	2,007		30.7%
1990	2,802		39.6%
2000	3,084		10.1%
2010	2,958		−4.1%
2020	3,150		6.5%
U.S. Decennial Census

=== 2020 census ===
As of the 2020 census, Maybrook had a population of 3,150. The median age was 40.2 years. 22.0% of residents were under the age of 18 and 15.0% of residents were 65 years of age or older. For every 100 females there were 86.8 males, and for every 100 females age 18 and over there were 83.3 males age 18 and over.

98.4% of residents lived in urban areas, while 1.6% lived in rural areas.

There were 1,254 households in Maybrook, of which 31.4% had children under the age of 18 living in them. Of all households, 41.4% were married-couple households, 17.5% were households with a male householder and no spouse or partner present, and 34.4% were households with a female householder and no spouse or partner present. About 31.0% of all households were made up of individuals and 15.5% had someone living alone who was 65 years of age or older.

There were 1,336 housing units, of which 6.1% were vacant. The homeowner vacancy rate was 2.5% and the rental vacancy rate was 4.5%.

Racial composition as of the 2020 census
Race	Number	Percent
White	1,930	61.3%
Black or African American	461	14.6%
American Indian and Alaska Native	11	0.3%
Asian	43	1.4%
Native Hawaiian and Other Pacific Islander	0	0.0%
Some other race	286	9.1%
Two or more races	419	13.3%
Hispanic or Latino (of any race)	803	25.5%

=== 2000 census ===
As of the census of 2000, there were 3,084 people, 1,043 households, and 780 families residing in the village. The population density was 2,306.3 inhabitants per square mile (890.5/km^{2}). There were 1,077 housing units at an average density of 805.4 per square mile (311.0/km^{2}). The racial makeup of the village was 82.81% white, 8.98% African American, .29% Native American, 1.2% Asian, 3.99% from other races, and 2.72% from two or more races. Hispanic or Latino of any race were 12.74% of the population.

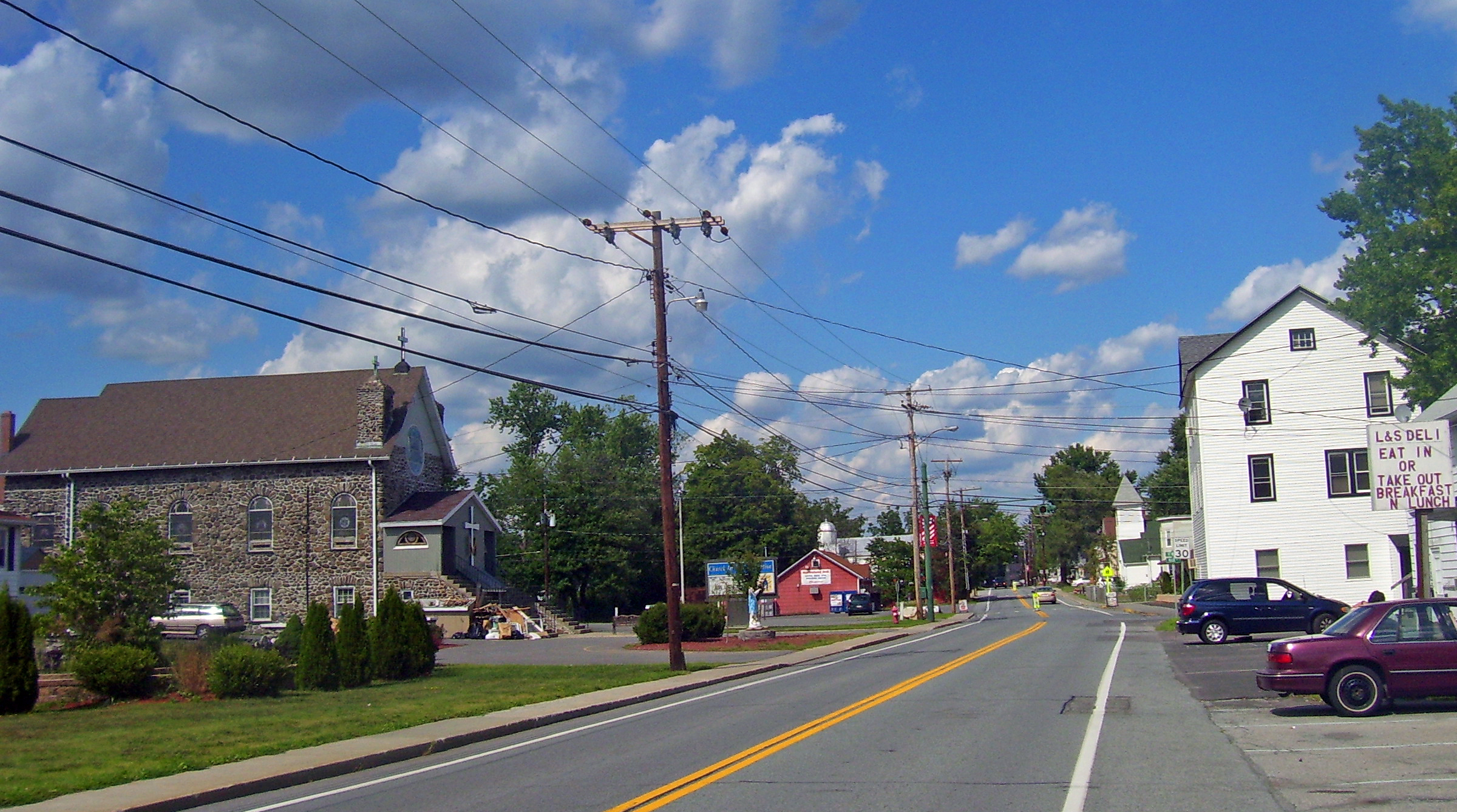
Downtown Maybrook in August 2008

There were 1,043 households, out of which 46.3% had children under the age of 18 living with them, 54.3% were married couples living together, 14.7% had a female householder with no husband present, and 25.2% were non-families. 19.9% of all households were made up of individuals, and 7.1% had someone living alone who was 65 years of age or older. The average household size was 2.95 and the average family size was 3.41.

In the village, the population was spread out, with 32.7% under the age of 18, 8.2% from 18 to 24, 32.8% from 25 to 44, 19.0% from 45 to 64, and 7.4% who were 65 years of age or older. The median age was 32 years. For every 100 females, there were 95.2 males. For every 100 females age 18 and over, there were 92.7 males.

The median income for a household in the village was $52,872, and the median income for a family was $56,912. Males had a median income of $40,165 versus $30,385 for females. The per capita income for the village was $19,194. About 3.6% of families and 6.1% of the population were below the poverty line, including 6.9% of those under age 18 and 11.2% of those age 65 or over.

== History ==
The hamlet was not incorporated as a village until 1926, making it the last of the town of Montgomery's three villages to be created. Its growth was spurred by the development of Maybrook Yard, an important railroad switching terminal where eastbound traffic from several railroads was funneled across the Poughkeepsie Bridge. At its peak, the yard employed over 1,500 workers. All yards, terminals and roundhouses have since been removed following the closing of the Poughkeepsie Bridge in 1974. There remains freight service to Maybrook via the Middletown and New Jersey Railroad.

== Transportation ==
Maybrook is accessible by Interstate 84, the New York State Thruway and Stewart International Airport. New York State Route 208 is the main north–south road through the center of the village. Yellow Freight operated a center in the village (occupying a large part of the former rail yard) until it ceased operations in 2023, soon to be replaced by R&L Carriers.

Campbell Hall station, on the Metro-North Railroad's Port Jervis Line, is 5.4 miles to the southwest. The Beacon station on the Hudson Line is 16.1 miles to the east.

== Education ==
In almost all of the village, the school district is Valley Central School District (Montgomery). A small piece extends into the Washingtonville Central School District.

== See also ==
- List of villages in New York
