= Wallkill River =

Tributary of Rondout Creek in New York and New Jersey

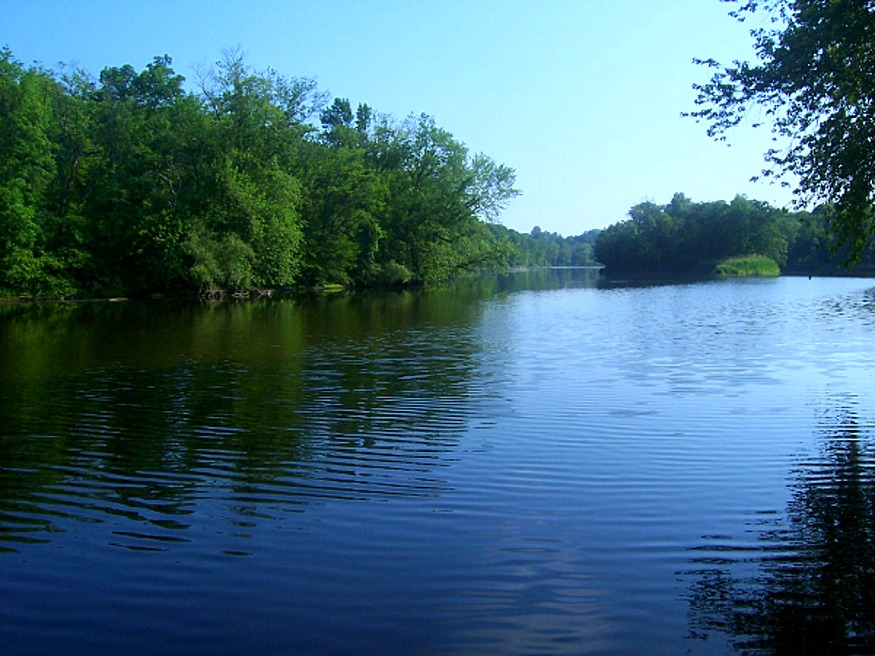
- Islands in the river near Walden, NY

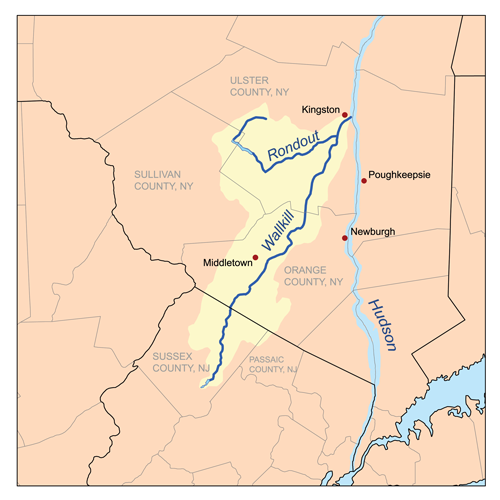
- The combined watersheds of the Wallkill and Rondout Creek
- Native name: Twischsawkin

Location
- Country: United States
- State: New York, New Jersey
- Counties: Ulster, NY, Orange, NY, Sussex, NJ
- Cities: New Paltz, NY, Walden, NY, Montgomery, NY, Sparta, NJ

Physical characteristics
- Source: Lake Mohawk, New Jersey
  - location: Sparta, Sussex County, NJ
  - coordinates: 41°01′58″N 74°38′38″W
  - elevation: 720 ft (220 m)
- Mouth: Rondout Creek
  - location: Rifton, Ulster County, NY
  - coordinates: 41°51′13″N 74°02′55″W
  - elevation: 0 ft (0 m)
- Length: 88 mi (142 km)
- Basin size: 785 sq mi (2,030 km^{2})
- Discharge
  - location: Gardiner, NY
  - average: 1,365 cu ft/s (38.7 m^{3}/s)

Basin features
- Tributaries
  - left: Shawangunk Kill
  - right: Papakating Creek

The Wallkill River, a tributary of the Hudson, drains Lake Mohawk in Sparta, New Jersey, flowing from there generally northeasterly 88.3 miles (142.1 km) to Rondout Creek in New York, just downstream of Sturgeon Pool, near Rosendale, with the combined flows reaching the Hudson at Kingston.

The river is unusual because it flows north between two major south-flowing rivers, the Hudson and the Delaware River. It also has the unusual distinction of being a river that drains into a creek, due to being impounded shortly before the Rondout confluence into a small body of water called Sturgeon Pool near Rifton, and what reaches the Rondout from there is the lesser flow.

== Course ==
The Wallkill near floodstage in September 2006, in the National Wildlife Preserve, in Sussex County, NJ. The bridge has since been removed.

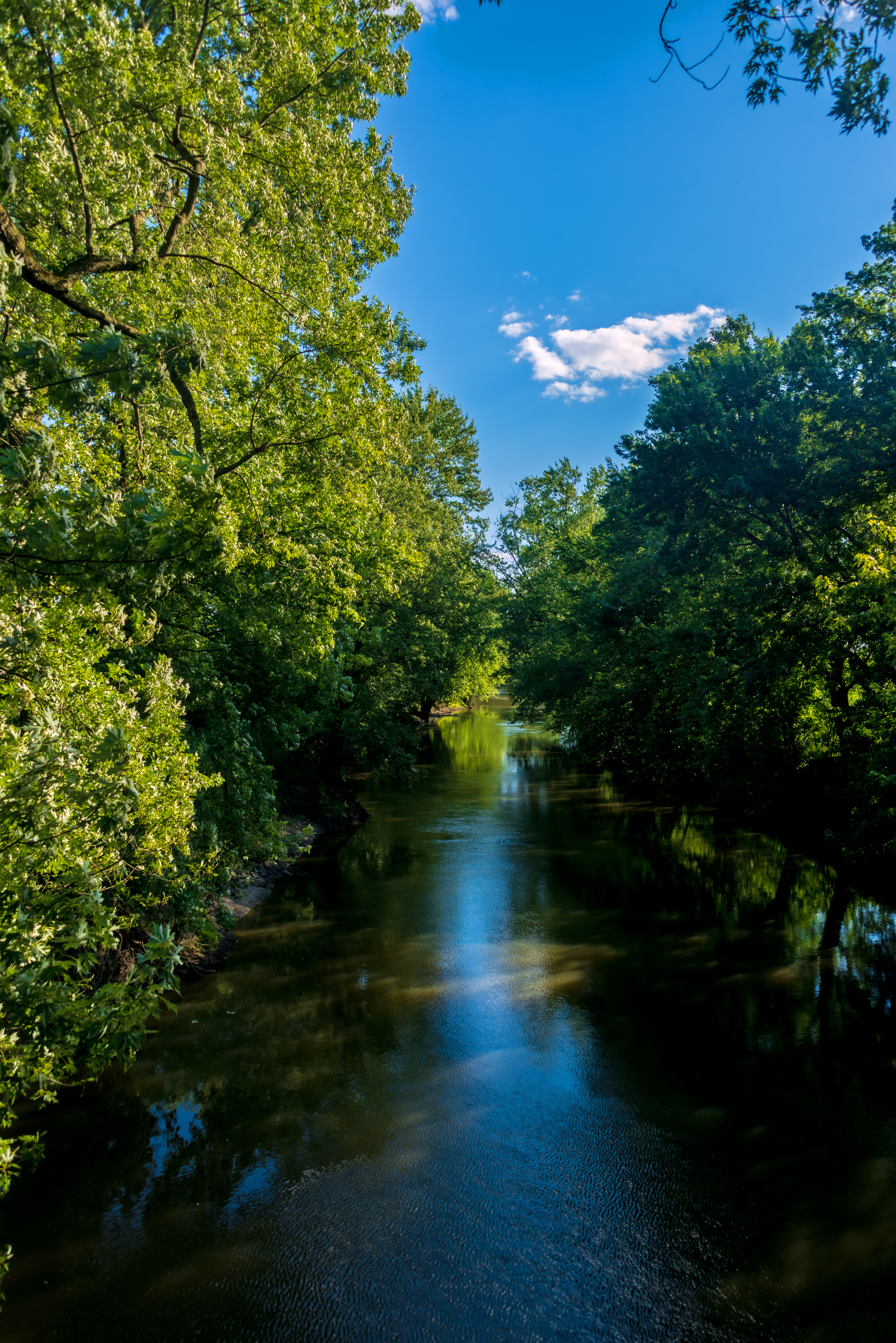
The channelized Walkill in the Black Dirt Region

The broad valley of the Wallkill River nestles between the main Appalachian Mountains and the New York-New Jersey Highlands, supporting much local agriculture. It is a part of the Great Appalachian Valley. In the beginning of its course it drains the eastern section of Sussex County, New Jersey, then flows through the Wallkill River National Wildlife Refuge at the New Jersey/New York state line. Most of the New Jersey portion is navigable by canoe. Then it is heavily diverted as it flows through the rich Black Dirt Region of Warwick. Until drainage projects were built here, this region was known as the Drowned Lands. After lending its name to the town of Wallkill, in northern Orange County, it begins to regain its volume as it passes by Orange County Airport, Montgomery and through Walden, where dams have been built in the past to provide power for local industry. The largest, in Walden, still is used by New York State Electric and Gas today.

After briefly serving as the line between Orange and Ulster counties, it passes by Wallkill, the second community to take its name from the river, and then the striking scenery of the Shawangunk Ridge is visible as it winds past the Ulster County Fairgrounds and New Paltz, where its floodplain becomes more noticeable, on the way to its mouth at the Rondout.

The Wallkill tends to cross political borders much more often than it forms them, at least in New York (in New Jersey it divides several townships). Other than the brief segment that follows the Orange-Ulster line, there is only southern Orange County, where it divides the towns of Minisink, Wawayanda and Wallkill on its west from Warwick and Goshen to the east. Two villages, Montgomery and New Paltz, are also bounded by the river in part.

In addition to the town and hamlet in New York, two school districts take their name from the river: Wallkill Valley Regional School District, in New Jersey and Wallkill Central in New York (Valley Central also derives its name indirectly from the river).

== History ==
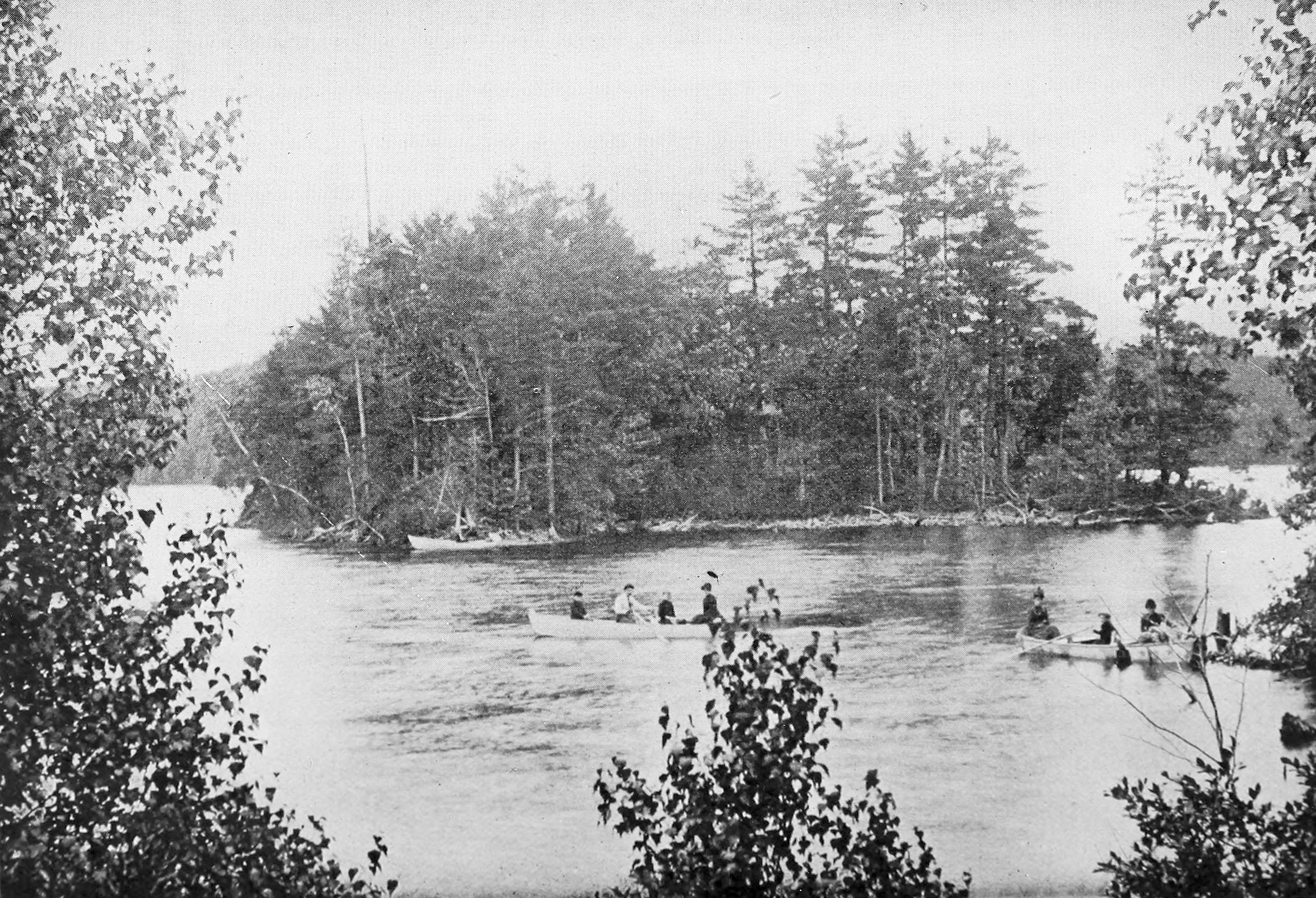
Wallkill River in Orange County, 1899

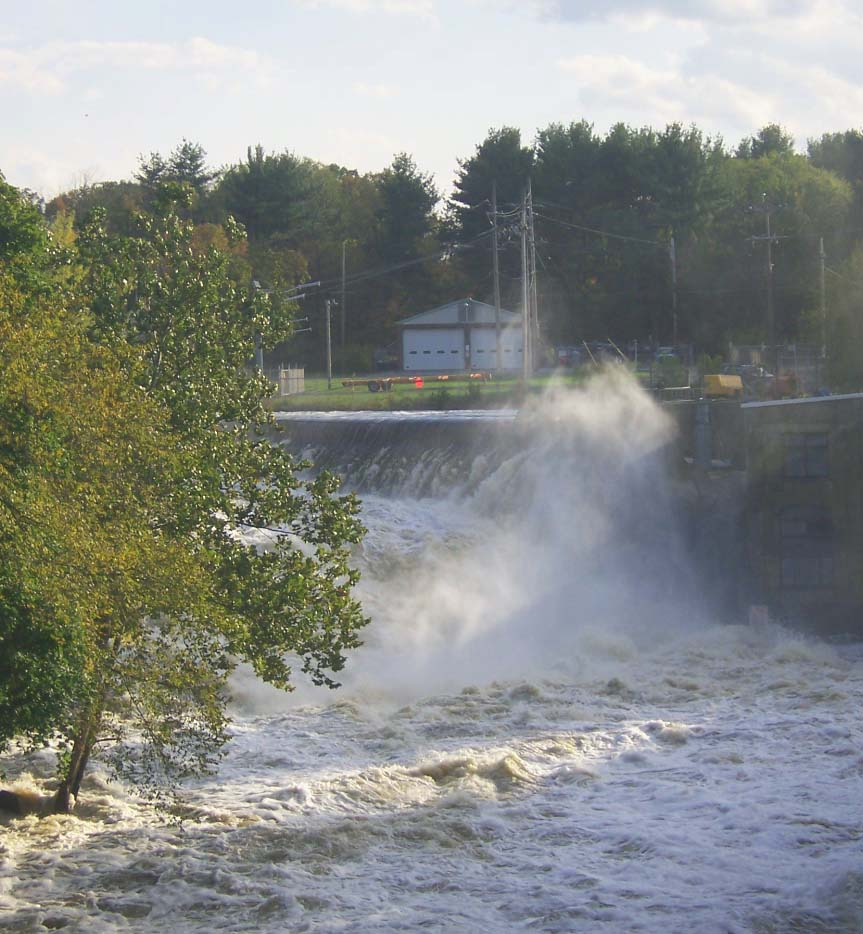
Dam, falls and NYSEG power station at Walden, seen here after heavy rainfall in October 2005

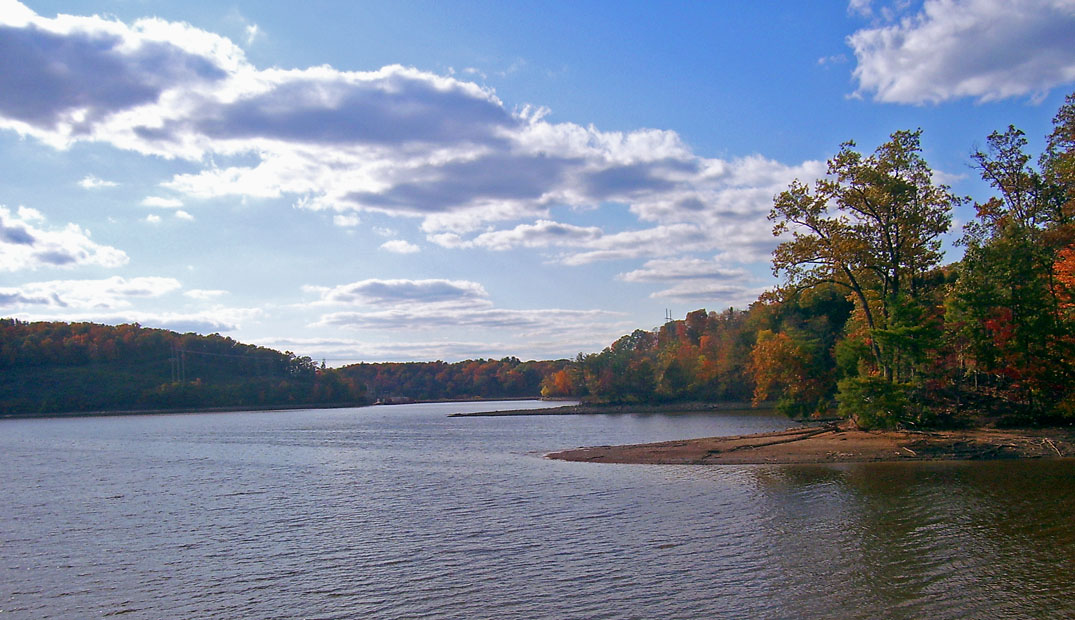
Sturgeon Pool, created by impounding the Wallkill shortly before it joins the Rondout.

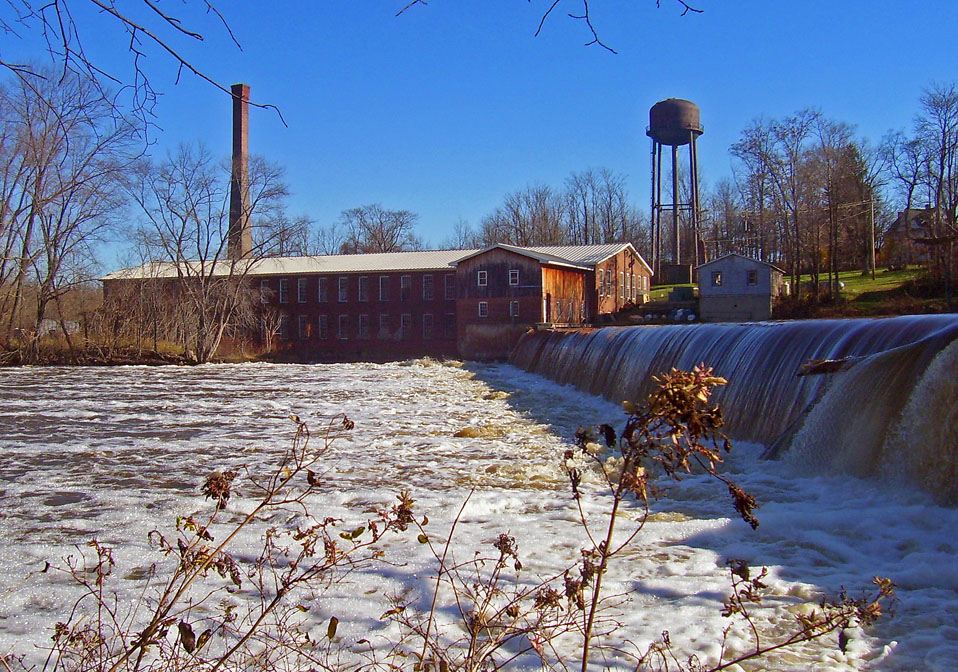
The Montgomery Worsted Mills, an early river industry

Native Americans knew the river as Twischsawkin. At least three prehistoric rock shelters have been found in archaeological digs in the region. For the indigenous peoples, it was not only important for its arable land but for its geological resources. The river and its valley are abundant in flint and chert, from which they made spear points and arrowheads.

European settlers of the region named it first the Palse River, after New Paltz. Later, when it was clear that the river continued well beyond the original New Paltz patent, it took after the Waal river in their native Netherlands. They worked their way down it from the Hudson Valley in the 17th century, and were followed by the British after the colony changed hands.

Settlers recognized the agricultural possibilities of the Drowned Lands almost as soon as they moved in. Efforts to divert the river and create more farmland appear to have begun as early as 1760. It would take 66 years, however, before a canal succeeded in draining the land and making enough available to profitably cultivate.

By that time industry was beginning to harness the river, too, as Jacob Walden established his mill in the village downriver that would later take his name. Millers in the Black Dirt Region clashed heavily with farmers in what were known as the Muskrat and Beaver Wars for decades afterwards, since the millers needed the water to flow freely while the farmers depended on keeping it diverted. In 1871 the farmers finally won. What industry there was would be confined to Montgomery and Walden where the railroad ran nearby.

In Ulster, vacationers frequented the Springtown neighborhood of New Paltz during the late 19th to early 20th century, making use of the Wallkill for recreation. Many of the larger older homes still on Springtown Road were boarding houses for these people escaping from the summer heat to the cool banks of the Wallkill River.

In August 1955, the river experienced record-breaking flooding when hurricanes Connie and Diane brought heavy rainfall to the region. Heavy flooding of the river and its smaller tributaries from the April 2007 nor'easter forced a number of road closures and evacuations of homes in its flood plain in central Orange County.

== Cleanup ==
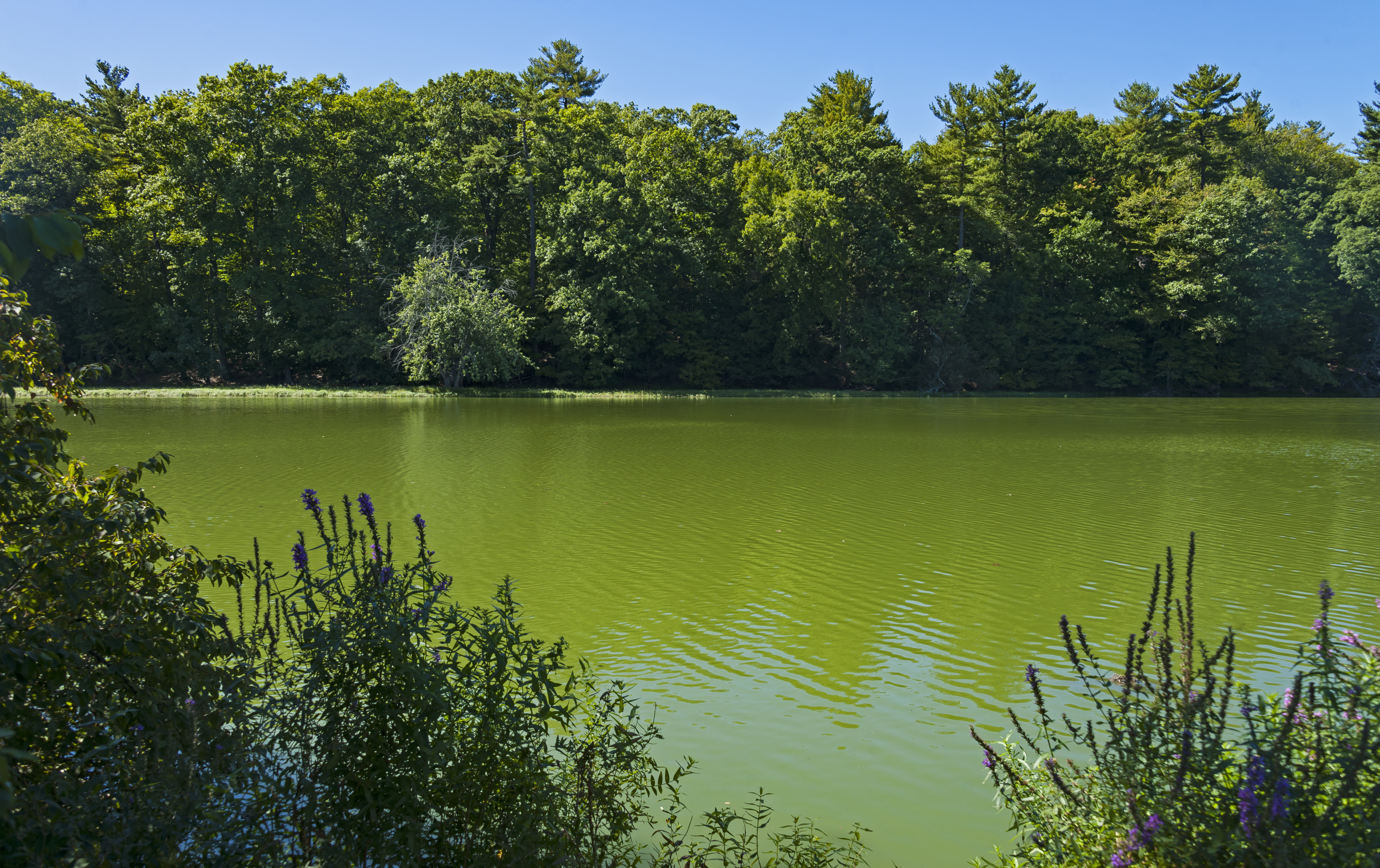
The 2016 algae bloom, seen at Wallkill

There have been several efforts in the late 20th and early 21st centuries to clean up the river.

At the turn of the century, a Wallkill River Task Force was formed, with representatives from both Ulster and Orange counties. From the 'Acknowledgements' of the "Wallkill River Watershed Conservation and Management Plan":

"A crucial development in the history of Wallkill Watershed protection efforts was the scheduling of a Wallkill River conference in 1998. Held at Orange County Community College and organized by the Orange County Land Trust (OCLT), this conference could be considered the birth of the Wallkill River Task Force (WRTF) – a ‘project’ of the OCLT. While some focus on this Watershed was already occurring amongst government agencies, the WRTF created a non-governmental group that actively sought the volunteer participation of farmers, business people and other ‘ordinary’ citizens, in addition to government and conservation agency employees, to provide for broad-based leadership in protecting the Wallkill River and its watershed lands."

One result of that Task Force's work was the drafting of a conservation and management plan. Riverkeeper's water-quality program has been testing samples at many places along the river with the help of citizen-scientists.

In late summer 2016, the Wallkill River Watershed Alliance, along with Riverkeeper, documented a potentially toxic large blue-green algae bloom, prompting the two groups to warn that could be harmful to people, dogs or other pets. After the samples were taken from the river, New York's Department of Environmental Conservation confirmed a Harmful Algae bloom with High Levels of Toxins. Riverkeeper responded by calling on government officials to define the causes of the algae.

== Tributaries ==
The Wallkill has 69 tributaries in New York alone. Thirty are named.

Moving downriver (south to north)

- Wildcat Brook
- Clove Brook
- West Branch Papakating Creek
- Neepaulakating Creek
- Papakating Creek
- Beaver Run
- Pochuck Creek
- Wawayanda Creek
- Rutgers Creek
- Monhagen Brook
- Quaker Creek
- Masonic Creek
- Mannayunk Kill
- Muddy Kill
- Tin Brook
- Dwaar Kill
- Shawangunk Kill
- Plattekill Creek
- Saw Mill Brook
- Tributary 13/Mill Brook
- Kleine Kill

== See also ==
- List of crossings of the Wallkill River
- List of New Jersey rivers
- List of rivers of New York
- Thunder River, in the Grand Canyon, which also drains into a creek
- Kill (body of water)
