= Orange Lake (New York) =

Lake in Orange Lake, New York

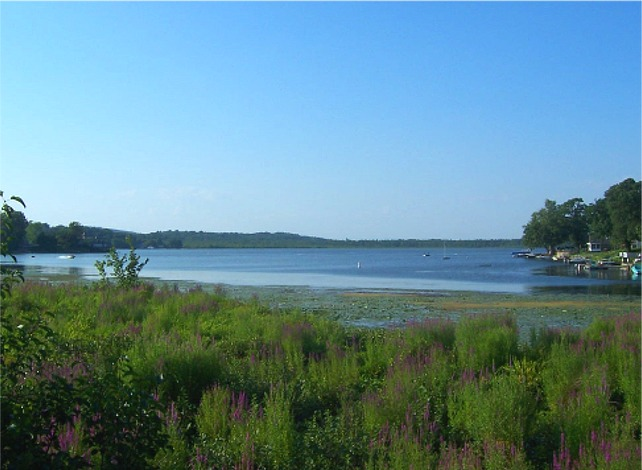
- View of lake from NY 52 along south shore

- Location within New York Location within the United States
- Location: Orange Lake, New York
- Coordinates: 41°32′57″N 74°06′12″W
- Primary inflows: Bushfield Creek
- Primary outflows: Bushfield Creek
- Basin countries: United States
- Max. length: 1.1 mi (1.8 km)
- Max. width: 4,000 ft (1,200 m)
- Surface area: 400 acres (160 ha)
- Surface elevation: 488 ft (149 m)

Orange Lake is located near the hamlet named after it in the Town of Newburgh, New York, United States. At 400 acres (160 ha) in surface area it is the largest lake entirely within Orange County, after which it is named.

== Geography ==
The lake, 1.1 miles (1.8 km) long by 4,000 feet (1,200 m) wide, sits in a glacial trough, with extensive swamps abutting its north and south ends and gentle rises on the east and west. NY 52 follows the lake's southern shore through these swamps, and NY 300 passes the northern end of the swamps in that direction. Lakeside Road runs along the heavily-developed eastern side of the lake, while Rock Cut Road parallels the western shore and gives access to the less-developed neighborhoods there.

It is fed from the north by Bushfield Creek, which rises to the north in the Town of Shawangunk in Ulster County. The creek then drains to the east, closely following Route 52, until it empties into Quassaick Creek near Algonquin Park. Via the Quassaick, the lake's waters eventually reach the Hudson River at the boundary between the city of Newburgh and New Windsor.

On clear enough days, it is possible to see the Devil's Path range in the Greene County section of the Catskills from the lake's southern end. This is one of the farthest locations to the south from which these peaks can be seen without climbing a mountain.

== History ==
The Native Americans called the lake "Oussuk", meaning "stony pond." The Dutch settlers called it "Binnin", meaning "water within land" or "water between other waters". In 1684, Governor Thomas Dongan purchased the lake and surrounding territory from the Native Americans and divided this patent into numerous farms, most especially dairy farms. At the time of the Revolutionary War, a man named Capt. Thomas Machin owned and operated a saw mill, grist mill, and finally a mint in what is now the hamlet, at the very beginning of the outlet stream. An historical marker marks the site of Machin's Mill on Lakeside Road. At that time, the lake began to be called Machin's Pond. In the 1830s, a local clergyman named James B. Wilson began calling the lake Orange Lake. The reasons for this name change remain obscure, but are probably related to its location in Orange County. Local legend states that many residents objected to this name change, but it did stick and remains the name of the lake and the hamlet to this day.

Because the lake is 488 feet (149 m) above sea level, its outlet stream became a very popular site for mills. The largest was the Newburgh Bleachery, owned and operated by the Chadwick Family.

During the 19th century, the shores of the lake became a popular location for summer cottages. Transportation to the lake and the hamlet was difficult until 1895, when trolley service was established between the City of Newburgh and the Village of Walden, and Orange Lake, approximately the half way point, became a popular stop. Soon after this Newburgh and Walden Electric Railway initiated service, a highly successful amusement park opened on the south shore of the lake. The trolley line went out of business in 1926. The amusement park went out of business during the Great Depression and was demolished in 1941.

Pine Point was a highly successful resort on a peninsula off the southern shore of the lake. During the big band era, many nationally known recording acts appeared at the resort, including Frank Sinatra and Benny Goodman. It opened for business in 1896, and was closed and demolished in 1953. Lakeview House on Lakeside Road originally opened in 1866 as a boarding house, and did business as O'Malley's Bar for many years. Today, it continues to do business as a restaurant under its original name.

== Use ==
The lake is not part of any local water supply system, and there is no public access for recreational purposes. Residents of the Orange Lake community who live on the eastern shore, or in the "Orange Lake Estates" neighborhood off of Rock Cut Rd. on the western shore have deeded access to the lake whether their property is on it or not; they use it for boating, fishing and swimming in summer and ice fishing during colder periods in winter when it freezes over.
