= Silas Gardner House =

Historic house in New York, United States

- U.S. National Register of Historic Places
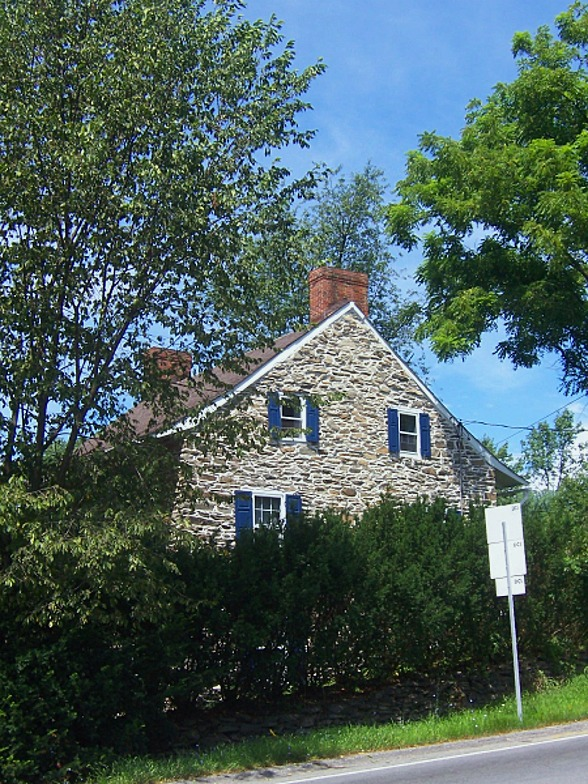
- The house as commonly seen, from Route 300

- Location within New York Location within the United States
- Location: 1141 Union Ave, Gardnertown, New York
- Coordinates: 41°31′37″N 74°4′10″W
- Built: 1783
- NRHP reference No.: 80002734
- Added to NRHP: March 28, 1980

The Silas Gardner House is a colonial stone house at the junction of routes 52 and 300 in the Gardnertown section of the Town of Newburgh in Orange County, New York. It has been listed on the National Register of Historic Places since 1980. The house was built in 1783 for Silas Gardner, a miller.

Gardner was the first to build a home in the area that would take its name from him. This name was kept despite his history during the Revolutionary War. He had at first supported his fellow colonists' demands for redress from Britain, but felt actually declaring independence was a reckless move that would backfire on the colonists and stayed out of the war. Later developments led him to aid the wife of a British officer from the area in escaping to Canada.

The house stood vacant for years after his descendants left it in the late 19th century. It might have had to be demolished until a family that had moved to the area from Minnesota bought it and renovated it in the 1970s.
