= New York State Route 300 =

Highway in New York

New York State Route 300
- Map of Hudson Valley in southeastern New York with NY 300 highlighted in red

Route information
- Maintained by NYSDOT
- Length: 14.67 mi (23.61 km)
- Existed: 1930–present

Major junctions
- South end: NY 32 / NY 94 in Vails Gate
- NY 207 in Newburgh; NY 17K in Newburgh; I-87 Toll / New York Thruway / I-84 in Newburgh; NY 52 in Newburgh; NY 32 in Newburgh
- North end: NY 208 in Wallkill

Location
- Country: United States
- State: New York
- Counties: Orange, Ulster

Highway system
- New York Highways; Interstate; US; State; Reference; Parkways
← NY 299	→ NY 301

New York State Route 300 (NY 300) is a state highway located west of the city of Newburgh in the Hudson Valley of New York in the United States. The southern terminus of the route is at a five-way intersection with NY 32 and NY 94 in the hamlet of Vails Gate. From there, it runs generally northwesterly through the towns of New Windsor, Newburgh, and Shawangunk, to a junction with NY 208 near the hamlet of Wallkill. NY 300's two major changes of direction are marked by slightly unorthodox intersections with other state highways.

== Route description ==
NY 300 begins at a five-pronged junction with NY 32 and NY 94 in the hamlet of Vails Gate, also known as the Five Corners. The route heads north as Temple Hill Road, paralleling the New York State Thruway as it passes the New Windsor Cantonment State Historic Site, where George Washington dismissed the Continental Army in 1783. Following that, the highway begins to curve to the west ahead of an intersection with County Route 69 (CR 69), named Union Avenue. Here, NY 300 takes on the Union Avenue name just before intersecting and converging with NY 207 (Little Britain Road) adjacent to the James "Squire" Patton House—now the city of Newburgh's police K-9 unit training facility—at the southern tip of Lake Washington. At the next junction 0.4 miles (0.6 km) later, a signalized intersection just east of a Thruway overpass, NY 207 continues straight ahead to the west toward Goshen while NY 300 turns right and heads north.

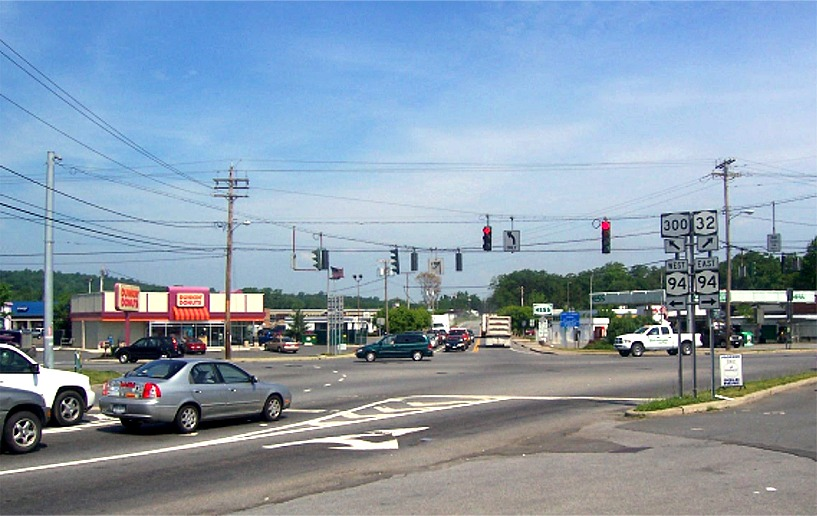
Southern terminus of NY 300 at NY 32 and NY 94 in Vails Gate

The route follows the Thruway to the New Windsor–Newburgh town line, where NY 300 expands to two lanes in both directions as it crosses into Newburgh. The next three miles (4.8 km) of NY 300 serves as the town's main commercial strip, featuring several national chain stores and smaller, more local businesses. A middle turn lane exists from the NY 17K junction all the way up to NY 52. North of NY 17K, the highway runs by a few hotels and offices on its way to a junction with Interstate 84 and the Thruway (Interstate 87). Past this junction, NY 300 passes the modest Newburgh Mall and an assortment of other retail establishments until the commercial zoning finally ends at the NY 52 intersection, which marks the center of an area of the town of Newburgh known as Gardnertown. The hamlet is named for Silas Gardner, an early settler whose stone house is still in use just north of the intersection, past the Orange Lake outlet brook.

Immediately north of the NY 52 junction, NY 300 reverts to two lanes as Union Avenue leaves the route to the northwest as a town road. Increased traffic and poor visibility made the junction with Union Avenue a dangerous intersection; accordingly, in 2005 the New York State Department of Transportation made left turns onto Union Avenue illegal. The number of accidents did not decrease at first due to widespread ignoring of the no left turn signs; however, increased vigilance by the Newburgh police has cut down significantly on accidents at this "Y" intersection. Now named Union Avenue Extension, NY 300 heads northeast, crossing Gardnertown Road at an intersection with a full four-way traffic light. At this point, it passes the town of Newburgh's Town Hall, Code Compliance Building, and Police Headquarters. Just beyond this triumvirate of municipal buildings is the current Gardnertown Magnet School of the Newburgh Enlarged City School District, where NY 300 becomes Plattekill Turnpike. After 1.5 miles (2.4 km) of both commercial and residential properties, including the Gardnertown Riding Stables, the highway reaches the Town Court at the junction with NY 32, which marks the center of an area of town named Cronomer Valley. While the junction is a standard four-way intersection, the highways do not intersect as such. Instead, NY 32 enters from the southeast and leaves to the north while NY 300 turns left and heads to the northwest past the south end of Chadwick Lake, the town's reservoir and also the only Town-owned and operated park. Chadwick Lake Park features picnic pavilions, an extensive children's playground, fishing and boating facilities, and a hiking trail which circles the lake, a total of 1.5 miles. Beyond Chadwick Lake Park, this section of NY 300 is largely a rural two-lane road that serves as a connector between Newburgh and Wallkill, a hamlet in the adjacent Ulster County town of Shawangunk. As it heads to Wallkill, NY 300 crosses the Thruway on a bridge rebuilt in 2005 which is the only integrated pier cap type bridge to be found in the area.

The route continues northwest across a rural section of the town to the Ulster County line near the top of Kings Hill, one of the highest elevations in the town. NY 300 briefly turns to the north and parallels the county line before veering to the west and passing into Ulster County and the town of Shawangunk. Within the town, the last on NY 300, the route trends in a more westerly direction toward Wallkill. The route ends just shy of the hamlet at a junction with NY 208 northeast of the community.

== History ==
=== Designation ===
The east–west portion of modern NY 300 from Wallkill to Cronomer Valley was taken over by the state of New York by 1926 and designated as NY 300 as part of the 1930 renumbering of state highways in New York. At some point between 1942 and 1954, NY 300 was extended southeastward to U.S. Route 9W at the Newburgh city limits, creating a 3-mile (5 km) overlap with NY 32 from Cronomer Valley to US 9W. NY 300 terminated at this point while NY 32 continued south along US 9W as it does to this day. Motorists proceeding straight at this intersection had a direct route to the Newburgh waterfront and the Newburgh–Beacon Ferry across the Hudson River.

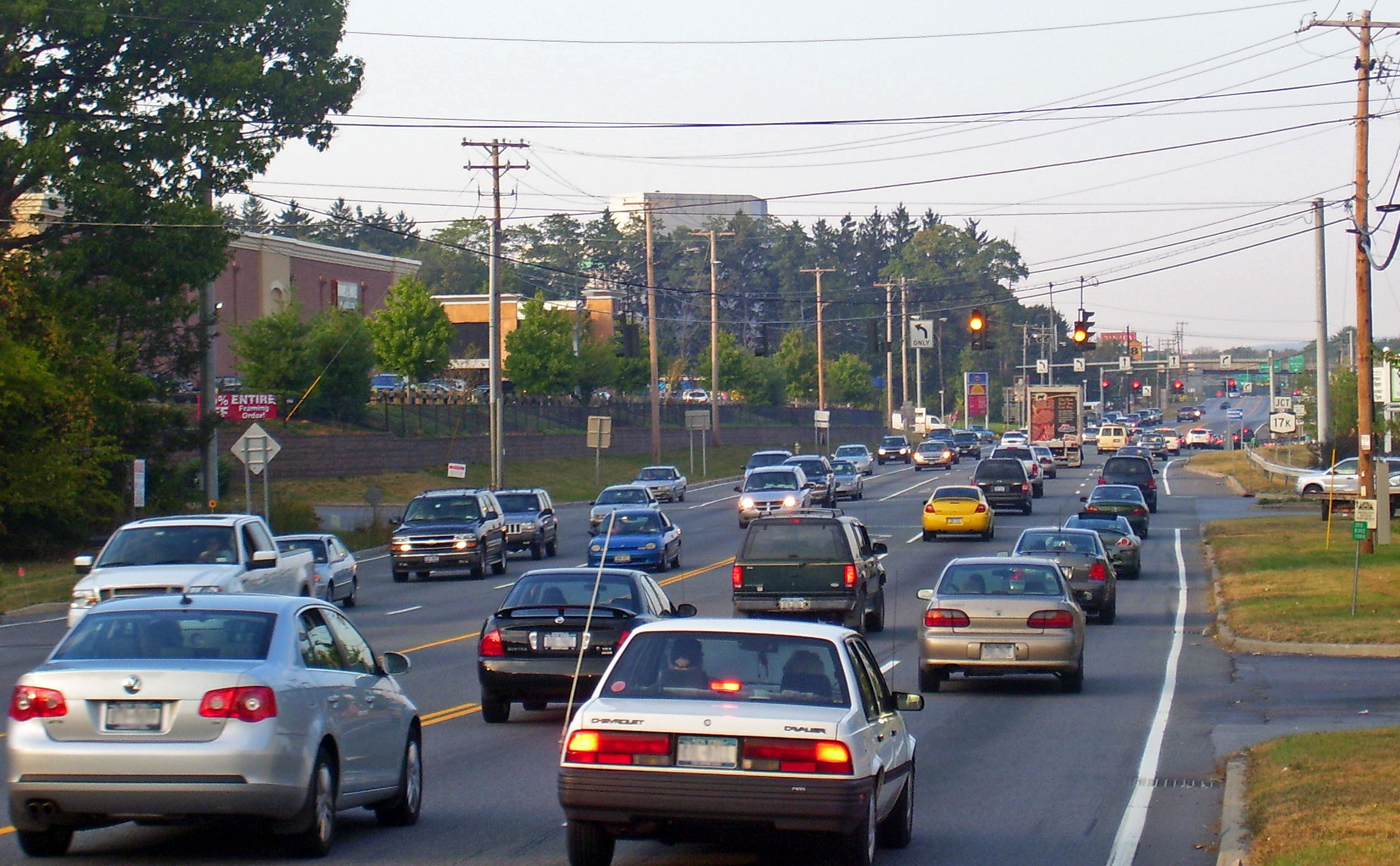
Commercial strip near the intersection with NY 17K

The intersection of Plank Road (NY 32) and Albany Post Road (US 9W) was reconfigured slightly as part of the construction of Interstate 84 and the Newburgh-Beacon Bridge. In order to avoid crossing under the freeway at exit 39, the section of Plank Road carrying NY 32 and NY 300 was relocated to the north of I-84. As a result, it now intersects with US 9W about 0.3 miles (0.5 km) north of the old intersection. When the bridge and I-84 were completed through Newburgh in 1963, the concurrency between NY 32 and NY 300 was abolished and NY 300 was truncated back to its original terminus at Cronomer Valley.

=== Southward extension ===
Prior to 1980, most of what is now NY 300 south of Cronomer Valley—namely Plattekill Turnpike, Union Avenue and Temple Hill Road—was maintained by Orange County as parts of several county routes. Plattekill Turnpike and Union Avenue were designated as CR 28 from Cronomer Valley to NY 52, CR 10 from there to I-84, and CR 38 from NY 17K to NY 207 east of Stewart International Airport. Temple Hill Road, meanwhile, was designated as CR 59. The section of Union Avenue between I-84 and NY 17K was state-maintained as an unsigned reference route.

On April 1, 1980, the state of New York assumed ownership and maintenance of CR 10, CR 28, CR 38, and CR 59 as part of a highway maintenance swap between the state and Orange County. The new north–south state highway became part of an extended NY 300, which made a 90-degree turn at Cronomer Valley and proceeded south to Vails Gate, briefly overlapping NY 207 in the vicinity of Lake Washington. This change roughly doubled the length of NY 300 (from 7 to 15 miles or 11 to 24 kilometres) and also resulted in the re-signing of NY 300 from an east–west route to a north–south route.

The original east–west orientation of NY 300 is reflected in the mileage given on the route's reference markers. Mileposts on the highway begin at the route's original western terminus at NY 208 in Wallkill and increase as the route heads east and south toward Vail Mills. As such, the markers on the route run contrary to the New York State Department of Transportation's standard practice of inventorying a north–south route from south to north.

The section concurrent with NY 207 was relocated slightly when it was widened just east of the Thruway. The former right-of-way is still visible in the woods just north of the roadway.

=== Road names ===
The original street names for the north–south section of NY 300 still enjoy wide local usage even though both the United States Postal Service and the local governments no longer recognize them as valid road names. Since the adoption of the 911 emergency system in 1997, the entire length of the road is now referred to officially as "Route 300", with the old names of Plattekill Turnpike, Union Avenue Extension, Union Avenue and Temple Hill Road being suppressed by the local governments and by the U.S. Postal Service. The name Route 300 has even replaced the old name North Plank Road west of Cronomer Valley, even though the name is retained by the Postal Service east of that intersection. The large signs on Interstate 84 still refer to NY 300 as Union Avenue, however, even though local and official use of this name has been suppressed for the past decade.

=== I-84/Thruway junction ===
When the New York State Thruway opened near Newburgh in 1955, exit 17 was a standard trumpet interchange that connected to Union Avenue and NY 17K. Interstate 84 was opened north and east of the junction in 1963 and west of the junction in 1969. No direct connection was built between I-84 and the Thruway, forcing traffic to utilize a short stretch of Union Avenue. At the time the Thruway was built there was little traffic on what later became NY 300 (at that time, a county road); the completion of I-84 and the subsequent development of the NY 300 corridor has increased traffic volumes in the area significantly.

In this setup, traffic left the freeway and encountered stop signs and traffic signals while traveling from one road to the other. The inadequate cloverleaf design of the junction between I-84 and Union Avenue led to problems, especially with articulateds, which must slow significantly to negotiate the sharp loop slips, and weave with traffic attempting to leave the freeway westbound. The I-84 off-slips had stop signs at the NY 300 termini; and there was no cloverleaf weaving area northbound through the junction. Southbound, traffic had to weave to join NY 300, or bear right to join the Thruway.

For many years state and local officials had wanted to build a direct connection between I-84 and the Thruway; however, federal funding did not become available until the very end of the 20th century. The New York State Thruway Authority had a project in the works to link exit 17 directly with I-84, bypassing NY 300; and reconstruct the interchange between NY 300 and I-84 (exit 36B). Plans online showed this as a diamond junction for the Interstate 84/NY 300 link; but there are signals in place for a left turn not shown in the Thruway Authority plans.

The junction between the Thruway and Interstate 84 works were begun in 2001 but the project was delayed when the original contractor for the job was found to have ties to organized crime. As of May 2006, total work on the project consisted of a rebuilding of the eastbound old exit 7 off-slip, removal of the southbound NY 300 to eastbound I-84 loop slip, installation of a traffic light, and the rerouting of the southbound NY 300 to eastbound I-84 movement via the same slip ramp that services the northbound NY 300 to eastbound I-84 movement.

The ramp for northbound exit 17 on the Thruway has been widened to two lanes and new signage has gone up on the northbound Thruway and westbound I-84.

The direct connection between I-84 and the Thruway was finally completed in December 2009, after being under construction for five years.

== Points of interest ==
NY 300 has a large share of local attractions. The Newburgh Town Clerk is located along NY 300 just south of Mt. Carmel Church of Christ. Lake Washington resides just to the East of NY 300, and the route curves around it for a scenic view. Heading northbound on NY 300 is where Chadwick Lake is located along with Chadwick Lake Park. Other historic landmarks such as the New Windsor Cantonment State Historic Site are located on NY 300. The Newburgh Mall is also located on NY 300.

== Major intersections ==
County	Location	mi	km	Destinations	Notes
Orange	Town of New Windsor	0.00	0.00	NY 32 / NY 94 – Newburgh, Highland Mills, Washingtonville, New Windsor	Southern terminus; hamlet of Vails Gate
Orange	Town of New Windsor	2.36	3.80	NY 207 east (Little Britain Road) – Newburgh	Southern end of NY 207 concurrency
Orange	Town of New Windsor	2.75	4.43	NY 207 west (Little Britain Road) – Goshen, Stewart International Airport	Northern end of NY 207 concurrency
Orange	Town of Newburgh	4.14	6.66	NY 17K – Montgomery, Stewart Air National Guard Base	
Orange	Town of Newburgh	4.7– 4.9	7.6– 7.9	I-87 Toll / New York Thruway / I-84 – Albany, New York City, Danbury, Scranton	Exit 17 on I-87 / Thruway; exit 36B on I-84
Orange	Town of Newburgh	5.70	9.17	NY 52 (South Plank Road) – Walden, Newburgh	Hamlet of Gardnertown
Orange	Town of Newburgh	7.64	12.30	NY 32 – Plattekill, Newburgh	Hamlet of Cronomer Valley
Ulster	Town of Shawangunk	14.67	23.61	NY 208 – Wallkill, New Paltz	Northern terminus
1.000 mi = 1.609 km; 1.000 km = 0.621 mi: Concurrency terminus; Electronic toll collection
