= Quassaick Creek =

River in the United States of America

Quassaick Creek Quassaic Creek
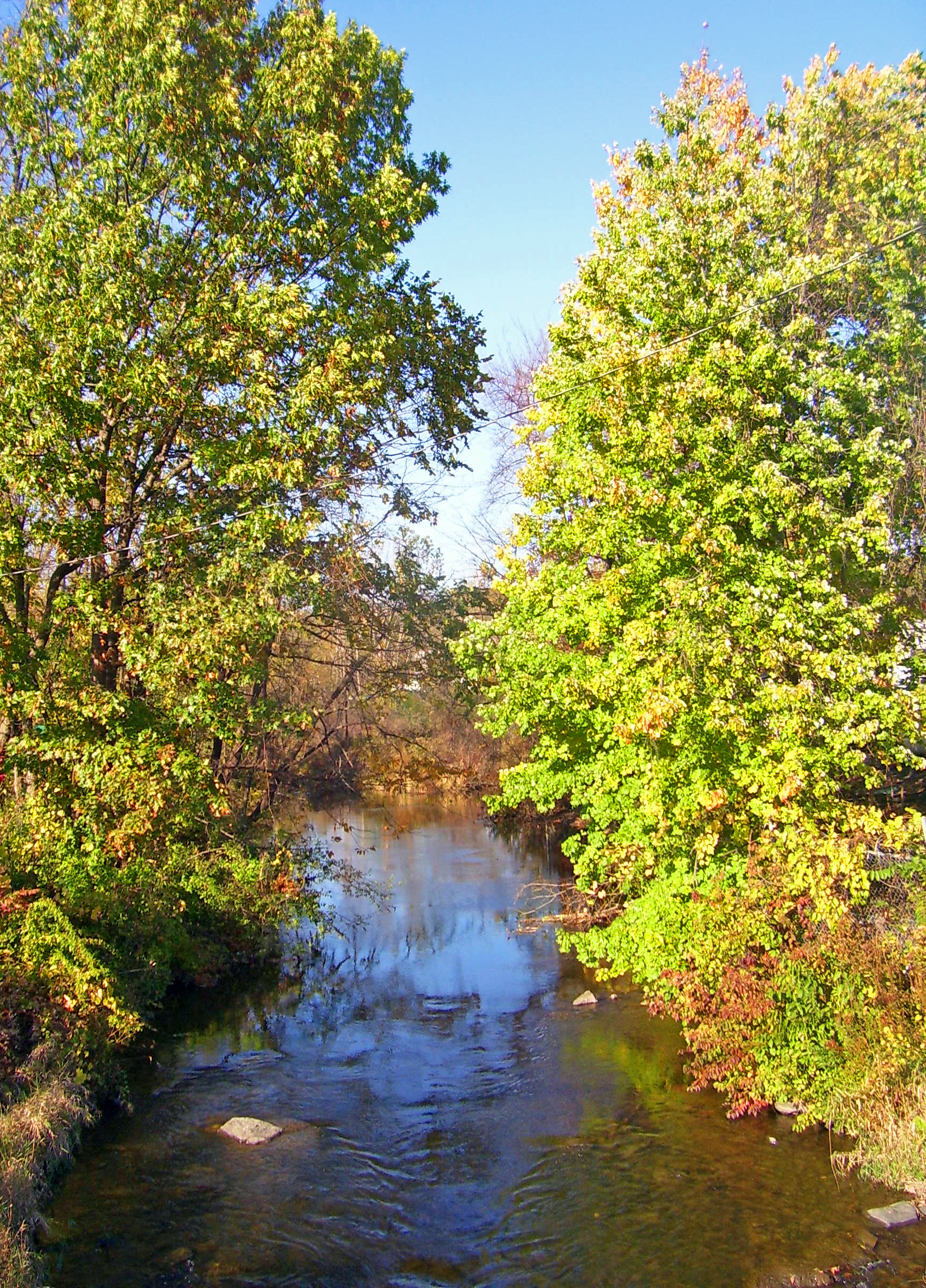
- Creek along the Newburgh city-town line
- Etymology: Algonquian for "stony brook"

Location
- Country: United States
- State: New York
- Counties: Orange, Ulster
- Municipality: Town of Plattekill, Town of Newburgh, City of Newburgh, Town of New Windsor

Physical characteristics
- Source: E of Tuckers Corner
  - coordinates: 41°39′45″N 74°01′34″W
  - elevation: 680 ft (210 m)
- Mouth: Hudson River
  - coordinates: 41°29′16″N 74°00′26″W
  - elevation: 0 ft (0 m)

Basin features
- Tributaries
  - right: Bushfield Creek

Quassaick Creek (Quassaic Creek on federal maps; also once known as Chambers Creek) is an 18.4-mile-long (29.6 km) tributary of the Hudson River in Orange and Ulster counties in the U.S. state of New York. It rises in the glacial ridges west of the river, near the boundary between the towns of Plattekill and Marlborough. From there it flows south into the town of Newburgh and then the city, where it eventually forms part of the border between it and neighboring New Windsor before emptying into the Hudson.

It was one of the earliest places settled by Europeans in the vicinity of what is present-day Newburgh. Milling and other industries were drawn to its banks, and it is impounded several times in its lower course, most significantly at Chadwick Lake, the Town of Newburgh's local water supply. The industrial development of the lower banks led to serious pollution of the creek in the 20th century. In the wake of successful cleanup efforts, some local citizens and organizations have proposed a system of parks and trails along the lower creek.

== Course ==
The creek rises on the western slope of the long glacial ridge known as Marlboro Mountain, a half-mile east of the small hamlet known as Tuckers Corners in the Ulster County town of Plattekill. From there it flows downward into the valley through a minimally developed series of swamps and ponds, south but trending further to the west. Just south of the hamlet of Plattekill, it reaches the Orange County line, then quickly jogs back due west into Ulster County, crossing under its first major road, NY 32, in the process. Then it resumes a southerly heading, paralleling Old Mill Road, the New York State Thruway and Route 32 back into Orange County. Two miles (3.2 km) to the south, it opens up into Chadwick Lake, a reservoir built in 1926 as a privately owned recreational lake, and purchased by the town of Newburgh in 1962 to serve as the town's main water supply. It is today a town park, with trails and a playground at the southern end.

After the dam, NY 300 crosses and Quassaick Creek remains parallel what is now Route 300 as it continues south. Here the surrounding land grows more developed and primarily residential. Finally, just north of Newburgh's Town Hall, it crosses 300 again and turns to the east, paralleling Gardnertown Road for almost a mile to county-owned Algonquin Park. In the marshes at the southeastern corner, it receives Bushfield Creek, its largest and only named tributary, then crosses under NY 52 and into another impoundment, Winona Lake, which gives the suburban area and its local fire district their name.

From the lake's decaying spillway the creek goes under Interstate 84 to Brookside Pond, in an undeveloped area just outside the city of Newburgh. The outflow from here veers east and then forms the line between the city and town of Newburgh as NY 17K crosses. A short distance below this, it enters Harrison Pond and then veers east into the city, crossing NY 207 near its northern terminus. It parallels 17K through a slightly wooded corridor, then is impounded again to create Muchattoes Lake, the center of a housing project built during the city's urban renewal efforts in the early 1970s. It crosses under Route 32 again, then widens and becomes the boundary between the city and the town of New Windsor to its south. A short distance later, after crossing under US 9W, a small valley opens up as it drops its last 100 feet (30 m) to reach the Hudson near a tank farm.

== History ==
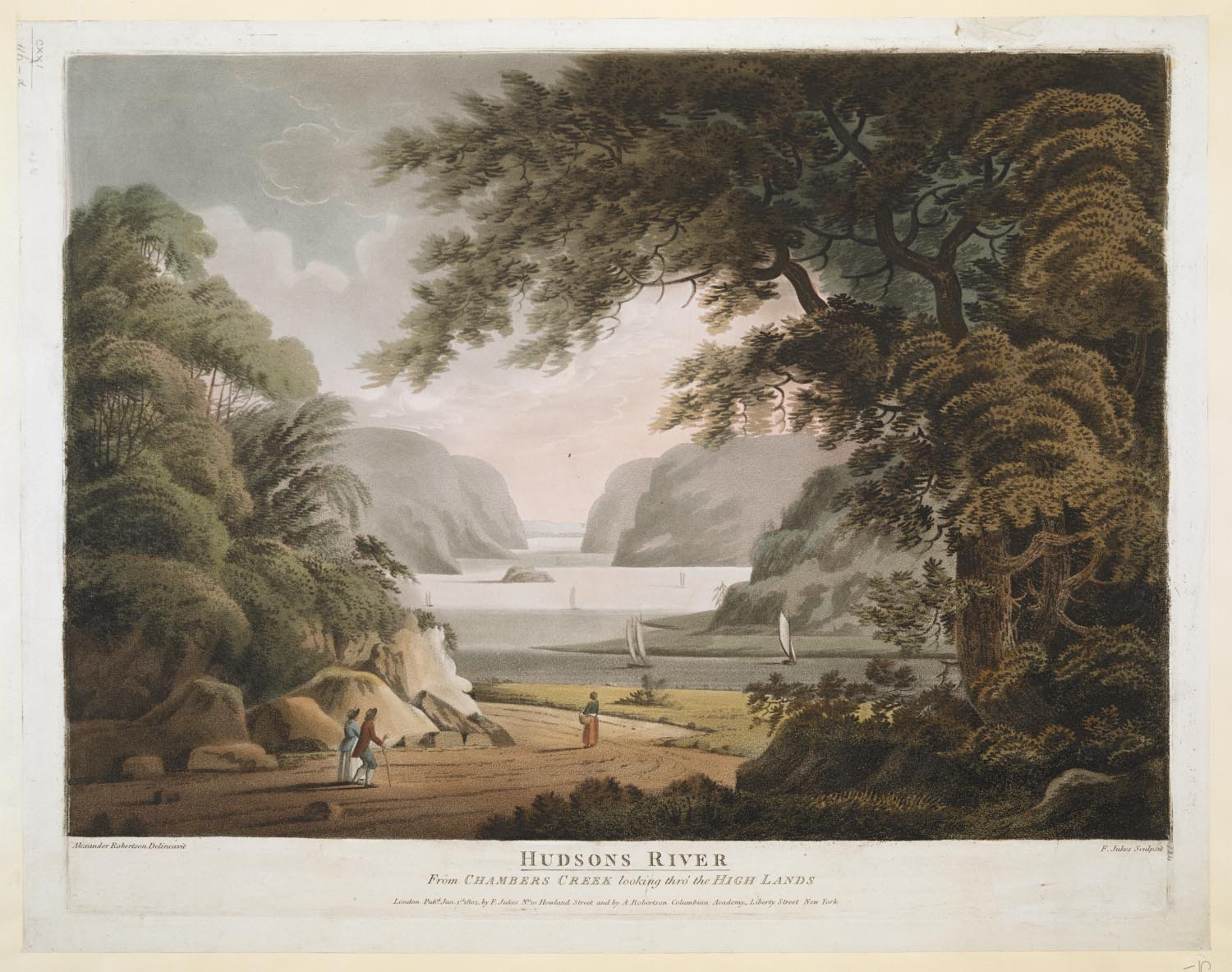
Hudsons River From Chambers Creek looking thro' the High Lands, Aquatint by Francis Jukes (1802)

In 1709, over 50 German Palatines settled along the north side of the creek near the Hudson, with the encouragement of Queen Anne. They were the first inhabitants of what later became Newburgh, and as a reward for making it productive, every man, woman and child among them was later granted 50 acres (20 ha) each by the British crown. No trace of this settlement survives today.

As the settlement grew into the city, and other towns were established nearby, both before and after American independence, the creek proved to be very useful first for millers and later to the developing factories. Development continued far upstream. At today's Algonquin Park, a large gunpowder mill complex, claimed at the time to be the largest in the country, was built. It is today recognized as the Orange Mill Historic District, and some of the stone buildings are still standing.

In 1879 a large squatters' camp on the banks of the creek along the Newburgh-New Windsor divide caused some local concern. The men in it were alarming residents by drinking, reveling, littering and poaching local produce, many refusing to or unable to find work. Newburgh police kept chasing the men away only to find they had reestablished themselves on the New Windsor side, where they had no jurisdiction nor (at the time) authority to pursue. They arrested those they could and eventually most of the group left of their own accord.

The dam creating Chadwick Lake along the creek further upstream, where water came from lands that remain rural, was built by the Chadwick family in 1926. The lake was built for recreational purposes and remained in private hands until the Town of Newburgh purchased it for use as a water supply in 1962. Throughout the rest of the century, the factories clustered along the creek in the city of Newburgh continued to freely discharge wastes into it.

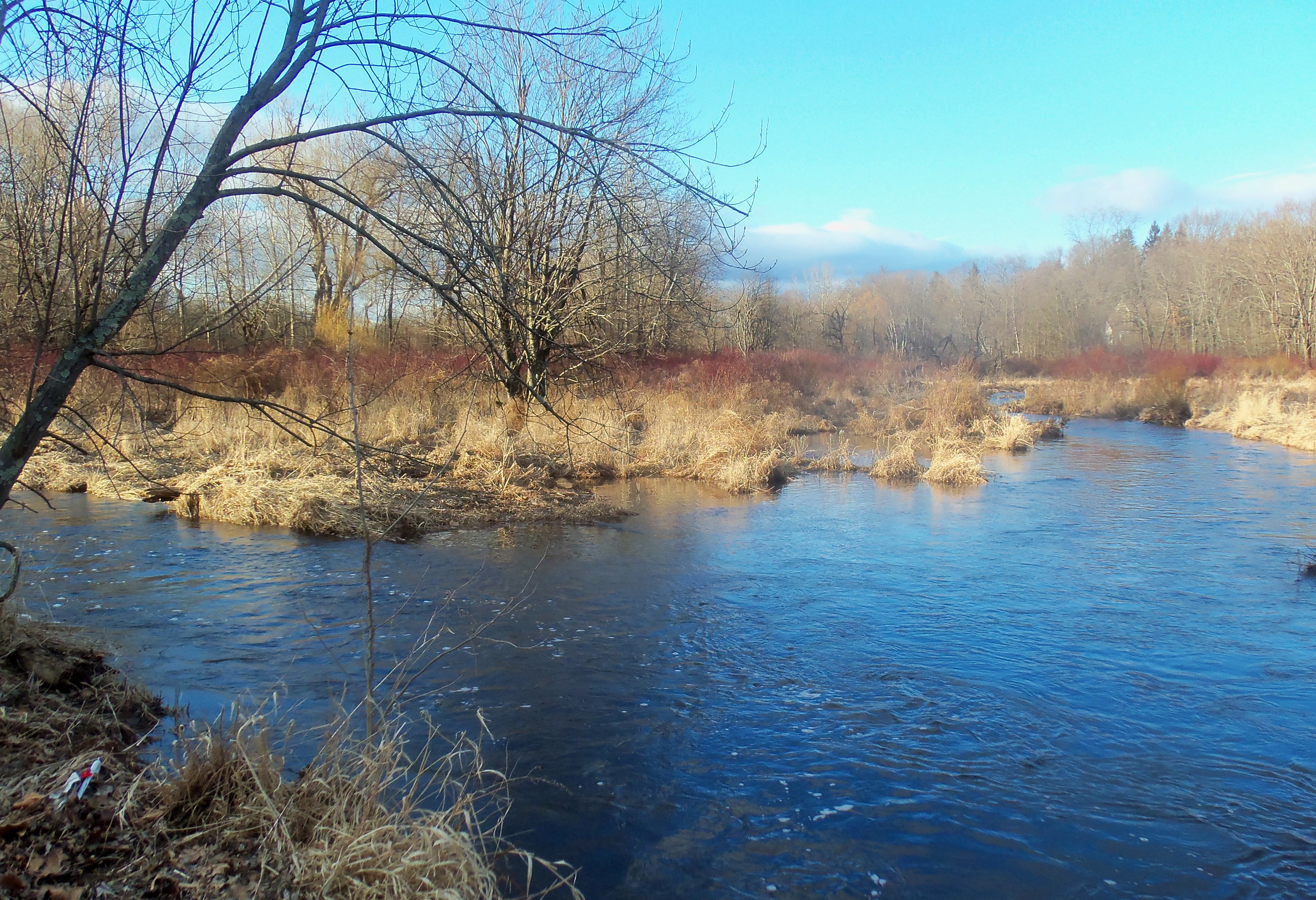
Confluence of the Quassaick and Bushfield Creek

Nothing was done about this until 1984, when Robert F. Kennedy, Jr., sentenced to 1,500 hours of community service with Hudson Riverkeeper after an arrest for heroin possession the year before, heard from the organization's founder, John Cronin, about local complaints about the pollution of Quassaick Creek. The work with Riverkeeper had led Kennedy to decide on environmental law as a career, and he resolved to identify all the polluters along the creek and sue them.

He and Cronin hiked along the lower seven miles (11 km) of the creek, taking notes and photos wherever they could. They dived and swam into ponds to collect samples, exposing themselves to raw sewage and many toxins such as naphthalene in the process. They snuck onto company roofs late at night to find illegal pipes. Eventually they identified 24 different sources of pollution and sued 16 different companies under the federal Clean Water Act, all of which settled before trial and helped clean up the lower Quassaick. Kennedy has since cited the experience as an epiphany, the moment he grasped the connection between environmentalism and his family's traditional involvement in social justice: "The battle for the environment ... was the ultimate civil rights and human rights contest, a struggle to maintain public control over publicly owned resources against special interests that would monopolize, segregate and liquidate them for cash." Since then the creek has recovered to the extent that residents have begun planning on how it could be made accessible and used as a park.

In December 2023, the organization Riverkeeper was awarded nearly 4 million dollars in federal funding to remove Holden Dam, now failing and obsolete, from Quassaick Creek.

== See also ==
- List of rivers of New York
