= James "Squire" Patton House =

Historic house in New York, United States

- U.S. National Register of Historic Places
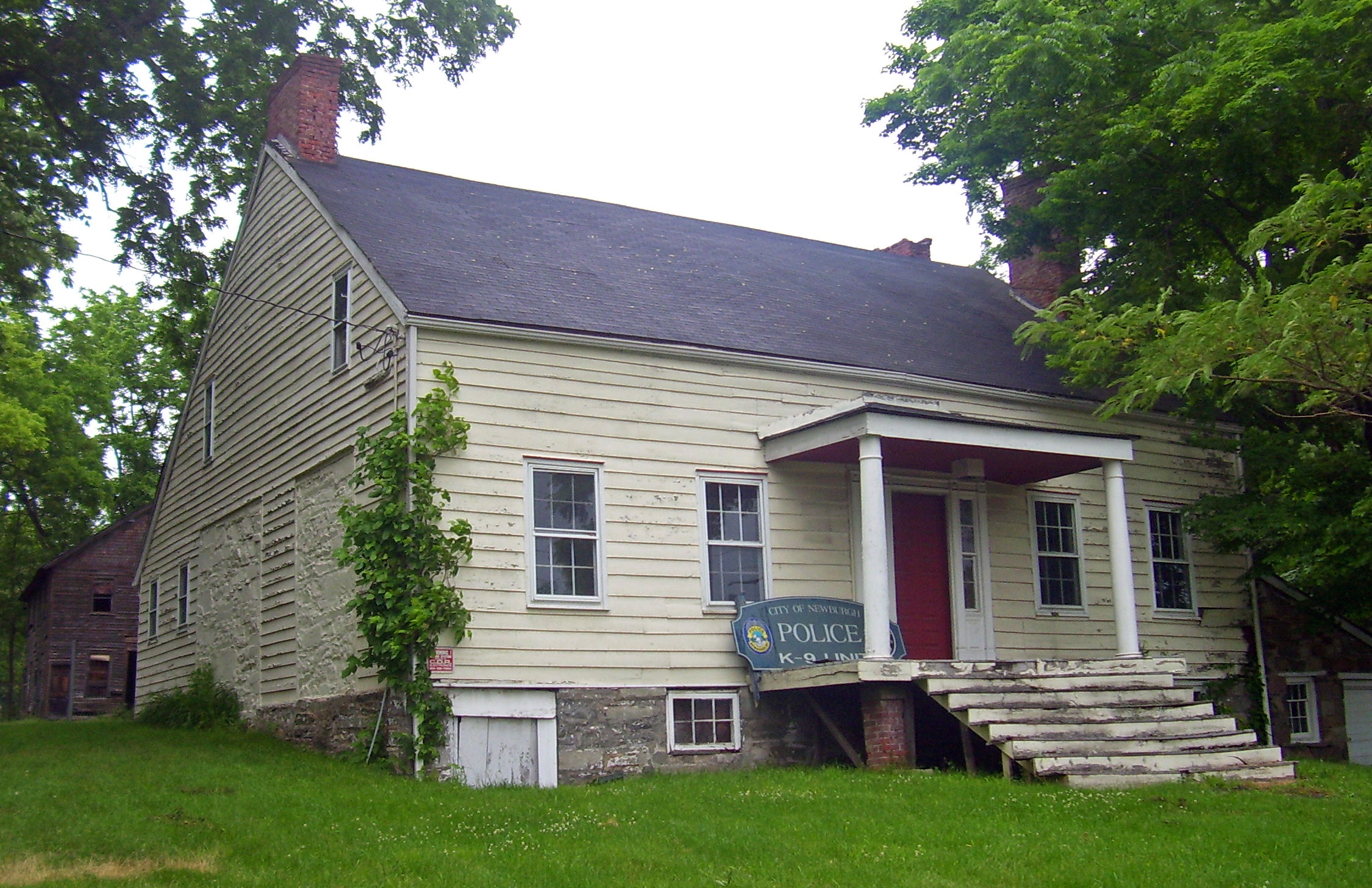
- Front (south) elevation and west profile with Newburgh police K-9 unit sign on porch and barn visible at rear left, 2008
- Location: New Windsor, New York
- Nearest city: Newburgh
- Coordinates: 41°29′07″N 74°04′23″W
- Area: 5 acres (2.0 ha)
- Built: c. 1790
- NRHP reference No.: 08000409
- Added to NRHP: May 12, 2008

The James "Squire" Patton House is located along the brief overlap of NY 207 and 300 in New Windsor, New York, United States. It is on a five-acre (2 ha) parcel owned by the nearby city of Newburgh, formerly used for police K-9 training. The house now sits abandoned and in a state of decay.

It was built c. 1790, although it is not known by whom. Patton, a prominent local farmer and landowner, bought the property as a young man a quarter-century later. It assumed its present form after several additions and renovations in the first 40 years of its existence. On May 12, 2008, it was listed on the National Register of Historic Places.

== Property ==
The house is a 1 1/2-story five-bay frame structure facing the road to the south, on a lot that slopes slightly up to and past it. Its front facade has four windows and a centrally located entranceway with wooden steps leading up to a covered porch. The raised foundation is of mortared fieldstone with some attempt at an ashlar pattern on the corners. The roof is a steeply pitched and gabled. Two brick chimneys rise from it.

A small stone lean-to was added on to the east at a later date. On the west are two exposed firebacks.

The interior has undergone more extensive renovation than the exterior, most recently for use as a police training facility. Beyond the room modified to serve as a classroom, many of the original finishes, the original plaster and decoration remains. The fireplace mantels have Federal style Tuscan colonettes with frieze and entablature, and the unusual rear-facing open-stringer staircase has a pyramidal newel post and oval handrails.

There are several contributing resources to the rear of the house. A two-story wooden barn is believed to date to 1880, and the remains of a stone smokehouse and another unidentified structure are nearby. The pattern of their stonework is similar to the lean-to on the east elevation, suggesting all three were built around the same time in the early 19th century. An old well and stone walls complete the original farmstead property.

== History ==
At the time of its original construction, the house was a more modest structure, less deep and less wide. In the early 19th century, it is believed, the house was expanded to its present size and the first floor reconfigured more in keeping with the Federal style houses beginning to come into style. Some traces of this expansion can still be seen on both the interior and exterior.

Patton, who had been born and raised a short distance away, bought the house and surrounding farmland that was to eventually reach 200 acres (81 ha) by 1830, possibly in 1825. He married around that time and began the house's last remodeling, adding the Federal decorative touches inside and other changes to make it a better home for his growing family. He distinguished himself in the Newburgh-area business community, helping to establish two banks, and served in several town offices. In 1860, his holdings were valued at $20,000 ($479,000 in 2008 dollars).

His son William returned to the farm with his own family in 1880 to help his aging father. By 1900, after the older man's death, William and the family and their servants had returned to Montgomery Street in Newburgh. He still owned the farm, but his workers lived in the house.

James Patton's land were slowly subdivided and sold in the early years of the 20th century. By the time the city of Newburgh acquired the land as part of the expansion of its Lake Washington reservoir to the north, only 52 acres (21 ha) were left. Eventually the city converted it to its present use as a police training facility.

== Aesthetics ==
Colonial-era houses in the Hudson Valley often strongly reflect either English or Dutch building traditions, sometimes combining both, as in the Bull Stone House in nearby Hamptonburgh. After independence, the Dutch-style stone houses faded from popularity in favor of more traditional English styles, which the Patton house largely reflects. The 1 1/2-story height, however, is a Dutch style, perhaps the only one that continued to be in use.
