= Orange Mill Historic District =

Historic district in New York, United States

- U.S. National Register of Historic Places
- U.S. Historic district
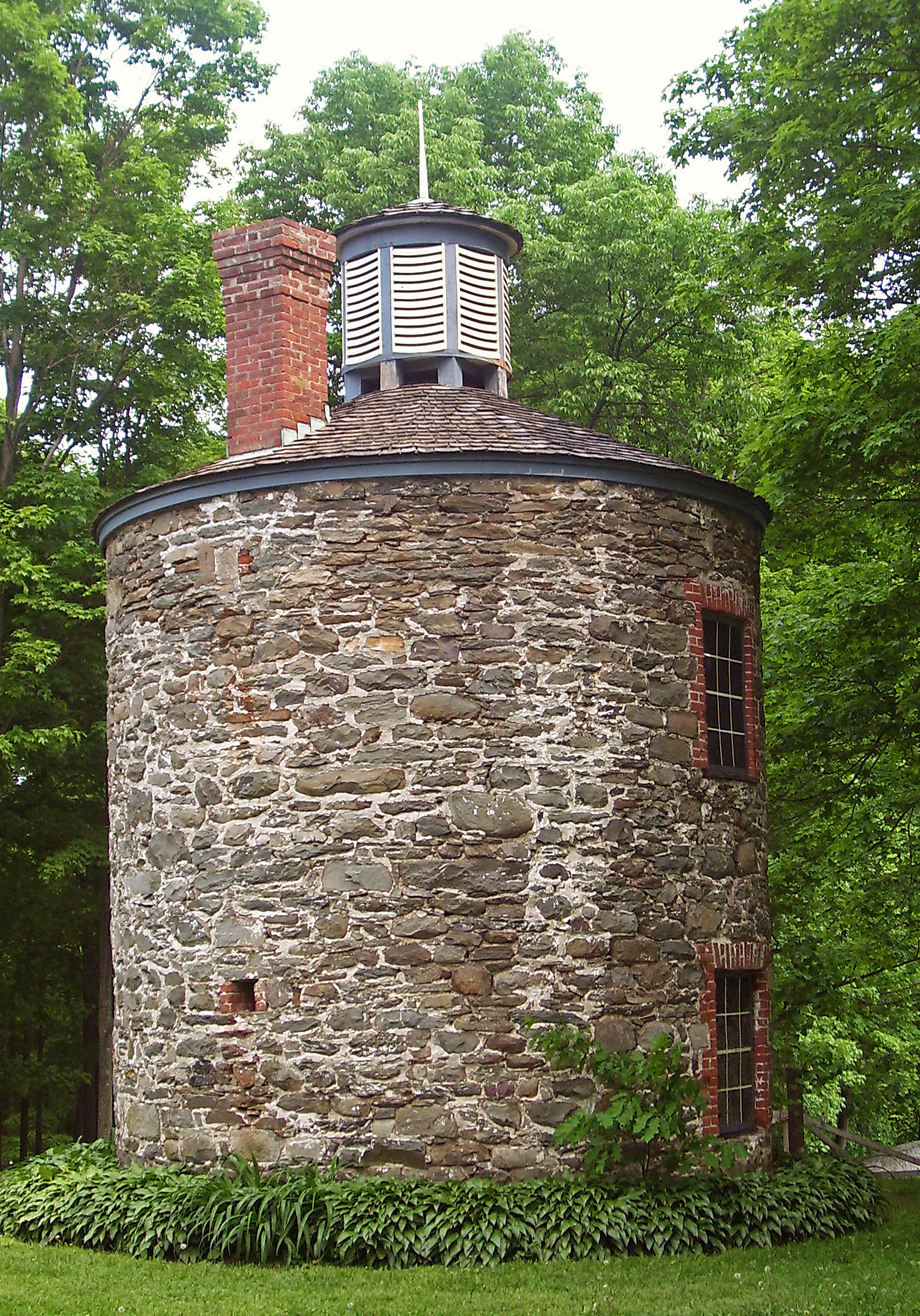
- The main powder mill building, on Powder Mill Road

- Location within New York Location within the United States
- Location: Town of Newburgh, NY
- Nearest city: City of Newburgh
- Coordinates: 41°31′24″N 74°03′34″W
- Area: 200 acres (81 ha)
- Built: 19th century
- Architectural style: Greek Revival, Federal
- NRHP reference No.: 97000357
- Added to NRHP: 1997

The Orange Mill Historic District is the only historic district in the Town of Newburgh in Orange County, New York. It encompasses the 42 acres (17 ha) of county-run Algonquin Park and many of the surrounding lands. It is centered along Powder Mill Road just off NY 52, a mile northwest of the city of Newburgh, at the edge of the suburban hamlet of Gardnertown.

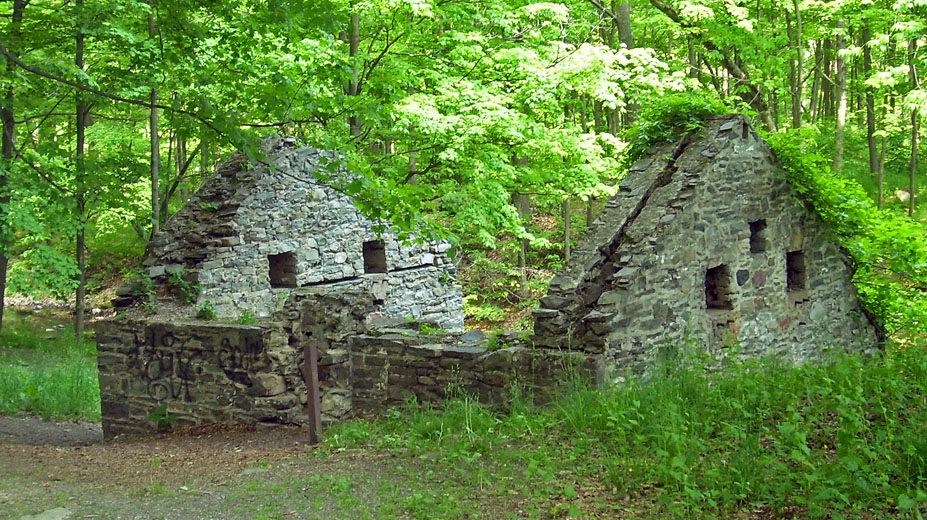
Ruins of some of the old powder mill buildings along the creek in the park

The district takes its name from the old gunpowder mill complex, built by Asa Taylor in 1816 and operated by the Laflin & Rand Powder Company after 1869. It is located along the unnamed Orange Lake outlet brook which flows through the park just above its outlet at Quassaick Creek.

While it primarily produced powder for local residents' use in hunting and shooting sports, during the Civil War the Union Army procured some higher quality material. In the years before that conflict, local historian Edward Ruttenber claimed the mills were "the most complete and extensive works in the country" when they were under the ownership of a man named Daniel Rodgers.

After production stopped in the early 20th century, developers began building on houses on some of the property. Col. Frederic Adrian Delano (1863–1953), uncle of future President Franklin D. Roosevelt, purchased the remaining land, which included the core of the manufacturing operation, for use as a public park. Originally it was to have belonged to the City of Newburgh and in fact was deeded to the city, even though it was not contiguous with the city and is over a mile outside the city limits. The City of Newburgh maintained the park until the mid-1970s, at which time it became cost prohibitive and it gave up ownership. Eventually, Orange County purchased the property and it remains a part of the Orange County Parks and Recreation system to this day. It is adjacent to Cronomer Hill Park, which borders it across Powder Mill Road to the northwest. Cronomer Hill Park is a separate Orange County Park.

Today the historic district includes 14 of these buildings which had been the core of the manufacturing operation as contributing properties. It was designed to incorporate the old buildings as an essential feature, and many of the roofless stone structures still stand next to the park's barbecue pits and picnic grounds. It is the only remaining 19th-century gunpowder production facility in New York. It was added to the National Register of Historic Places in 1997.
