= Gardnertown, New York =

- Census-designated place (CDP)
- Location in Orange County and the state of New York.

- Location within the state of New York
- Coordinates: 41°32′06″N 74°04′13″W
- Country: United States
- State: New York
- County: Orange

Area
  - Total: 4.84 sq mi (12.54 km^{2})
  - Land: 4.83 sq mi (12.50 km^{2})
  - Water: 0.015 sq mi (0.04 km^{2})
- Elevation: 410 ft (125 m)

Population (2020)
  - Total: 4,542
  - Density: 941/sq mi (363.4/km^{2})
- Time zone: UTC-5 (Eastern (EST))
  - Summer (DST): UTC-4 (EDT)
- FIPS code: 36-28310
- GNIS feature ID: 950902

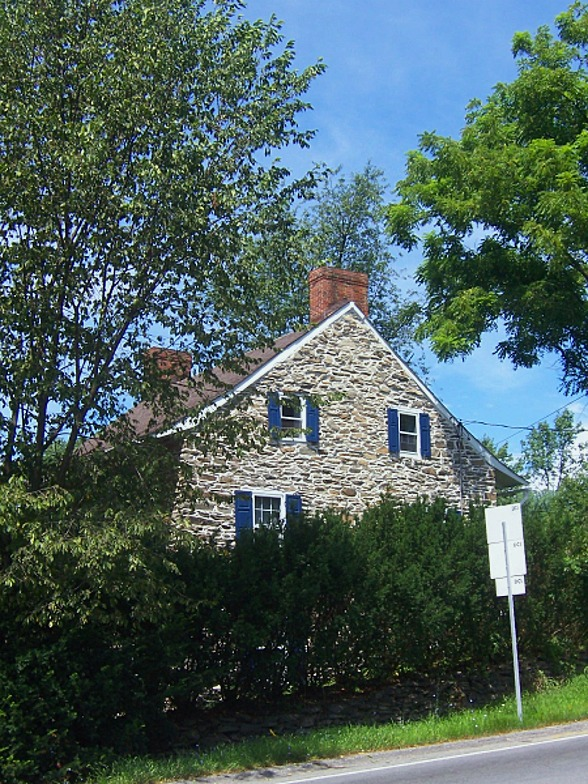
House built by Silas Gardner in mid-18th century, before American Revolution.

Gardnertown is a hamlet (and census-designated place) in Orange County, New York, United States. The population was 4,542 at the 2020 census. It is part of the Kiryas Joel–Poughkeepsie–Newburgh, NY Metropolitan Statistical Area as well as the larger New York–Newark–Bridgeport, NY-NJ-CT-PA Combined Statistical Area.

Gardnertown is located within the town of Newburgh, and is approximately two miles northwest of the city of Newburgh, a completely separate municipality. It takes its name from Silas Gardner, an early settler whose stone house, a Registered Historic Place, remains in use as a private residence on Route 300 just north of Route 52.

Gardnertown is the geographic center of the Town of Newburgh. Accordingly, most of the governmental buildings, including the Town Hall, the Police Department, and the Code Compliance (Old Town Hall) building, are all located in Gardnertown. The Town Justice Court is located about a mile and a half to the north.

== History ==
Gardnertown is named after the Silas Gardner family, whose home is still standing and in private use. Gardnertown Road was cut in half to make way for the NYS Thruway in the mid-1950s (as was Orr Avenue in the southern part of the Town). Site of the gunpowder mill, on Powder Mill Road, which is the centerpiece of the Orange Mill Historic District, the only historic district within the Town. The ruins of the mill are now part of Algonquin Park, owned and maintained by the Orange County Department of Parks and Recreation. The current Gardnertown Methodist Church building was constructed at its current location, the intersection of Gardnertown Road and Union Avenue, in 1858, replacing an earlier church built in 1825. The fellowship hall was built in 1957. The church is affiliated with Gardnertown Cemetery, one of the oldest cemeteries in the Town still in use, which is located both immediately east of the church, across Union Avenue, and south of the church, across Gardnertown Road. The Town of Newburgh American Legion Post 1420 is located on Union Avenue a short distance south of Gardnertown Methodist Church. Gardnertown Elementary School was located on Gardnertown Road. A new school was built on Plattekill Turnpike in the mid-1950s, where it remains today. The former schoolhouse then became Newburgh Town Hall. (Previously, the Town Hall was located in a building on Old South Plank Road, about a half a mile to the south. That building is no longer standing.) When the current Town Hall was constructed and opened next door in 1973 (at 1496 Route 300), the former schoolhouse became police headquarters. When the current police headquarters was built and opened next door in the other direction in 1989 (at 300 Gardnertown Road), it became an auxiliary Town Hall, housing the Code Compliance, Planning and Zoning Departments.

== Geography ==
Gardnertown is located at 41°31′41″N 74°3′26″W (41.527986, -74.057323).

According to the United States Census Bureau, the CDP has a total area of 4.9 square miles (13 km^{2}), of which 4.9 square miles (13 km^{2}) is land and 0.20% is water.

== Demographics ==
Historical population
| Census | Pop. | Note | %± |
|---|---|---|---|
| 2000 | 4,533 | | — |
| 2010 | 4,373 | | −3.5% |
| 2020 | 4,542 | | 3.9% |
U.S. Decennial Census

=== 2020 census ===
As of the 2020 census, Gardnertown had a population of 4,542. The median age was 40.7 years. 20.3% of residents were under the age of 18 and 16.4% of residents were 65 years of age or older. For every 100 females there were 97.5 males, and for every 100 females age 18 and over there were 95.2 males age 18 and over.

100.0% of residents lived in urban areas, while 0.0% lived in rural areas.

There were 1,618 households in Gardnertown, of which 30.4% had children under the age of 18 living in them. Of all households, 50.1% were married-couple households, 16.3% were households with a male householder and no spouse or partner present, and 24.9% were households with a female householder and no spouse or partner present. About 21.4% of all households were made up of individuals and 9.0% had someone living alone who was 65 years of age or older.

There were 1,736 housing units, of which 6.8% were vacant. The homeowner vacancy rate was 2.1% and the rental vacancy rate was 8.6%.

Racial composition as of the 2020 census
| Race | Number | Percent |
|---|---|---|
| White | 2,797 | 61.6% |
| Black or African American | 524 | 11.5% |
| American Indian and Alaska Native | 43 | 0.9% |
| Asian | 94 | 2.1% |
| Native Hawaiian and Other Pacific Islander | 1 | 0.0% |
| Some other race | 558 | 12.3% |
| Two or more races | 525 | 11.6% |
| Hispanic or Latino (of any race) | 1,154 | 25.4% |

=== 2000 census ===
As of the census of 2000, there were 4,533 people, 1,624 households, and 1,221 families residing in the CDP. The population density was 925.8 inhabitants per square mile (357.5/km^{2}). There were 1,674 housing units at an average density of 341.9 per square mile (132.0/km^{2}). The racial makeup of the CDP was 84.84% White, 6.57% African American, 0.33% Native American, 1.57% Asian, 4.37% from other races, and 2.32% from two or more races. Hispanic or Latino of any race were 10.72% of the population.

There were 1,624 households, out of which 37.7% had children under the age of 18 living with them, 58.8% were married couples living together, 11.1% had a female householder with no husband present, and 24.8% were non-families. 20.0% of all households were made up of individuals, and 9.4% had someone living alone who was 65 years of age or older. The average household size was 2.79 and the average family size was 3.23.

In the CDP, the population was spread out, with 27.5% under the age of 18, 6.6% from 18 to 24, 30.8% from 25 to 44, 22.8% from 45 to 64, and 12.4% who were 65 years of age or older. The median age was 36 years. For every 100 females, there were 95.4 males. For every 100 females age 18 and over, there were 94.1 males.

The median income for a household in the CDP was $55,655, and the median income for a family was $65,000. Males had a median income of $42,230 versus $30,308 for females. The per capita income for the CDP was $21,697. About 2.8% of families and 3.2% of the population were below the poverty line, including 4.3% of those under age 18 and 2.9% of those age 65 or over.

== Education ==
It is in the Newburgh City School District.
