= Newburgh (town), New York =

Newburgh
- Town
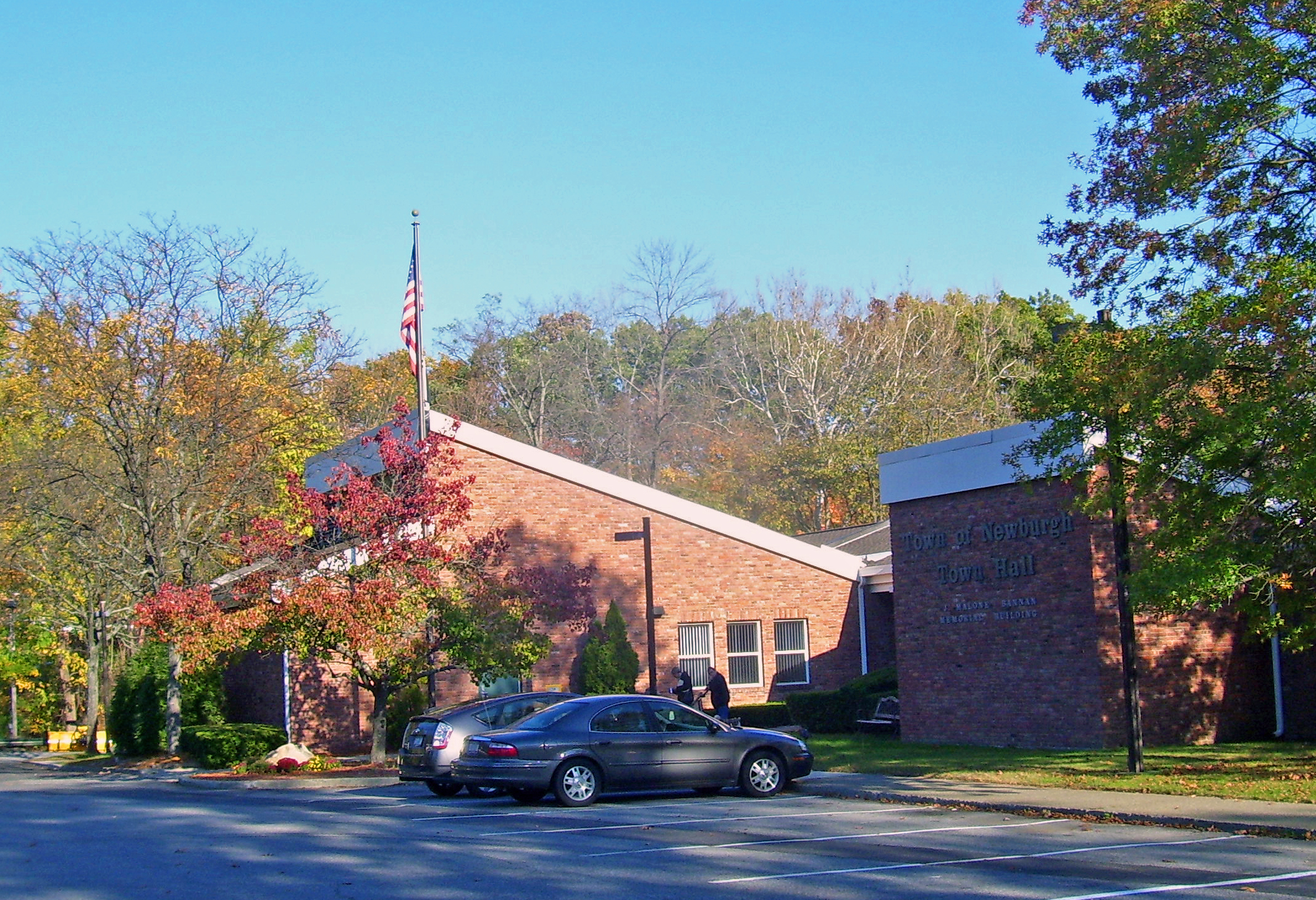
- J. Malone Bannan Center, the town hall, named for a former (1967–1978) town supervisor
- Nickname: Crossroads of the Northeast
- Location in Orange County and New York.

- Location within the state of New York
- Coordinates: 41°32′N 74°3′W
- Country: United States
- State: New York
- County: Orange

Area
  - Total: 46.94 sq mi (121.58 km^{2})
  - Land: 43.36 sq mi (112.31 km^{2})
  - Water: 3.58 sq mi (9.27 km^{2})
- Elevation: 423 ft (129 m)

Population (2020)
  - Total: 31,985
  - Density: 737.61/sq mi (284.79/km^{2})
- Time zone: UTC-5 (Eastern (EST))
  - Summer (DST): UTC-4 (EDT)
- Area code: 845
- FIPS code: 36-50045
- GNIS feature ID: 0979259
- Website: www.townofnewburghny.gov

Newburgh (/ˈnuːbɜːrɡ/) is a town in Orange County, New York, United States. It forms part of the Kiryas Joel–Poughkeepsie–Newburgh metropolitan area, which is a part of the New York metropolitan area, and is a suburban satellite of the urbanized city of Newburgh. The city of Newburgh was a part of the town prior to 1865. New York Stewart International Airport is partially located within the township, and much of the land into which it could have been expanded has been turned into Stewart State Forest.

As of the 2020 census, the population of the town is 31,985. The 2010 census determined the population was 29,801, marking the first time ever that the population of the town of Newburgh officially exceeded that of the neighboring city of Newburgh (with a population of 28,866). Estimates released by the U.S. Census Bureau during 2018 show the Newburgh township's population exceeded 30,000. As of 2020 the town and neighboring city of Newburgh had a combined population of 60,842.

The town of Newburgh is known as the "crossroads of the Northeast", a phrase coined in the 1980s by then-town supervisor Robert J. Kirkpatrick Jr., not only because of Stewart Airport and the Hudson River, but also because two major interstate highways cross the town: Interstate 84 (east and west) and Interstate 87, also known as the New York State Thruway (north and south). Previously, the highways were accessible to each other via a short stretch of New York State Route 300 (a major north–south thoroughfare and a main commercial corridor in the town) but a direct connection between I-84 and the Thruway was completed in December 2009, after being under construction for five years.

== History ==
Newburgh was originally settled in 1709 by German Palatine refugees under the name of "Neuburg", who were soon supplemented by a significant number of Scottish immigrants. It was chartered as a precinct in 1762. It was while Newburgh was a precinct, during the closing months of the American Revolutionary War, that General George Washington established his headquarters at the Hasbrouck House in what is now the city of Newburgh. It was during this time that the Newburgh letter was written by Lewis Nicola and the Newburgh Conspiracy took place.

Newburgh was rechartered as a town in 1788. At that time, it was a part of Ulster County. In 1798, the town of Newburgh and several other towns in southern Ulster County were transferred to Orange County, to compensate for the southernmost part of Orange County being cut away to form Rockland County. The town of Newburgh has remained a part of Orange County ever since. The village of Newburgh was incorporated in 1800. Then as now, villages in New York State remained a part of their parent towns. However, when the village was re-chartered as the city of Newburgh in 1865, it became totally independent of the town.

The town of Newburgh remained overwhelmingly rural and sparsely populated until well into the 20th century. There were many apple orchards in the northern part of the town, and dairy and vegetable farms in the remainder of the town. It is believed one of the largest was Brookside Dairy Farm, just west of the city of Newburgh on the north side of the old Newburgh-Cochecton Turnpike (now Route 17K). The farm was owned by the Stewart family (which gave both Stewart Avenue on the site and Stewart International Airport their names) and ran as far north as South Plank Road, now also known as Route 52. It was known in its day for its state of the art facilities which produced dairy products in an innovative and scientific way. The farm also included an ice business on the banks of Brookside Pond. After World War II, the southern part of the farm became a popular drive-in theater, and the northern part was the site of a baseball stadium known as Tarr Oval, which was used by the Newburgh Little League for many years. The PepsiCo bottling plant and corporate offices are now located on the site of Tarr Oval.

Since Orange Lake is nearly 600 feet above sea level, its outlet stream (sometimes called Bushfield Creek) powered many varied mills as it wound its way to the Hudson River, including a saw mill, grist mill and coinage mill right at the outlet from the lake, all owned by Thomas Machin. A flour mill stood where the stream now travels beneath Route 300. In a different part of town, the Gidney family operated a grist mill on Gidneytown Creek. Today, the site of the Gidney Mill is owned by the town, and the old brick chimney from the mill remains standing and is marked by an historic site marker. The animal control center for the town is also located on this property. The old gunpowder mills in what is now Algonquin Park today serve as the focal point of the only historic district in the town. For many years, there was a bleachery owned by the Chadwick Family.

In the 19th century, hamlets sprung up throughout the town, between farms. These were small communities which (typically) consisted of a general store, a church, sometimes a cemetery, and a post office, quite often in the home of the postmaster or as part of the general store. Each hamlet also included a few scattered homes, often of tradespeople.

The population of the town of Newburgh was only 4,246 in 1900 and 6,092 in 1940, on the eve of World War II. However, after World War II the population skyrocketed as more and more farmland and forestland was converted to housing developments. Many of the new residents of the town in the 1940s and 1950s were World War II veterans who were able to purchase their own homes under the provisions of the G.I. Bill. Also, the booming economy after World War II allowed many families to afford to purchase automobiles, which made residency in the suburbs away from central city cores practical for the first time. In addition, parents of baby boomer children desired to raise these children in a suburban or rural atmosphere as opposed to crowded city life.

Also after World War II, the costs of continued farming, especially shipping costs, made farming more and more unprofitable. Many farm owners subdivided their farms for home building, and some were forced by financial reasons to do so. This post-World War II housing explosion pretty well petered out by the time of the energy crisis and recession in the early to mid-1970s. This lull in new housing was also a result of the departure of many major employers who left the city of Newburgh and other surrounding communities to relocate in southern states, where the cost of labor was much cheaper. This exodus of local employment climaxed with the closing of Stewart Air Force Base—by far the region's largest employer—in 1970. There are several housing developments—Wedgewood Park being perhaps the most prominent example—which received subdevelopment and building approval in the 1960s but were not actually built until many years later.

Home building started again in the late 1980s as more and more New York City, Westchester County, and Rockland County residents fled urban sprawl and spiraling tax rates. While in the 1950s and 1960s a drive of two to three hours one way to commute to work was unacceptable, by the 1990s many people considered it routine.

The U.S. Census Bureau estimated that the town grew by 3,000 just in the five-year period from 2000 to 2005 alone. Since 2000, homes in virtually every part of the town are being built on lots which twenty years ago were considered unsuitable for this purpose.

The town became less and less a residential suburb for local employees and more and more a "bedroom" community for commuters to jobs outside the region.

In 1960, the population was 15,547. It went over 20,000 by 1970, and nearly exceeded 30,000 in the 21st century.

On January 5, 2010, the United States Census Bureau opened an office at 1437 Route 300, just south of the intersection with Route 52, which oversaw the 2010 census count in Orange, Sullivan and Delaware counties.

While the census count in 2010 showed that, for the first time in history the population of the town of Newburgh exceeded that of the city of Newburgh, the population increase was not sufficient to render the town the most populous municipality in Orange County. The towns of Monroe and Warwick, located in the southern part of Orange County in the path of commuter routes, both greatly exceeded the town of Newburgh in 2010, despite both being rural farm communities of less than 10,000 each fifty years earlier.

== Geography ==
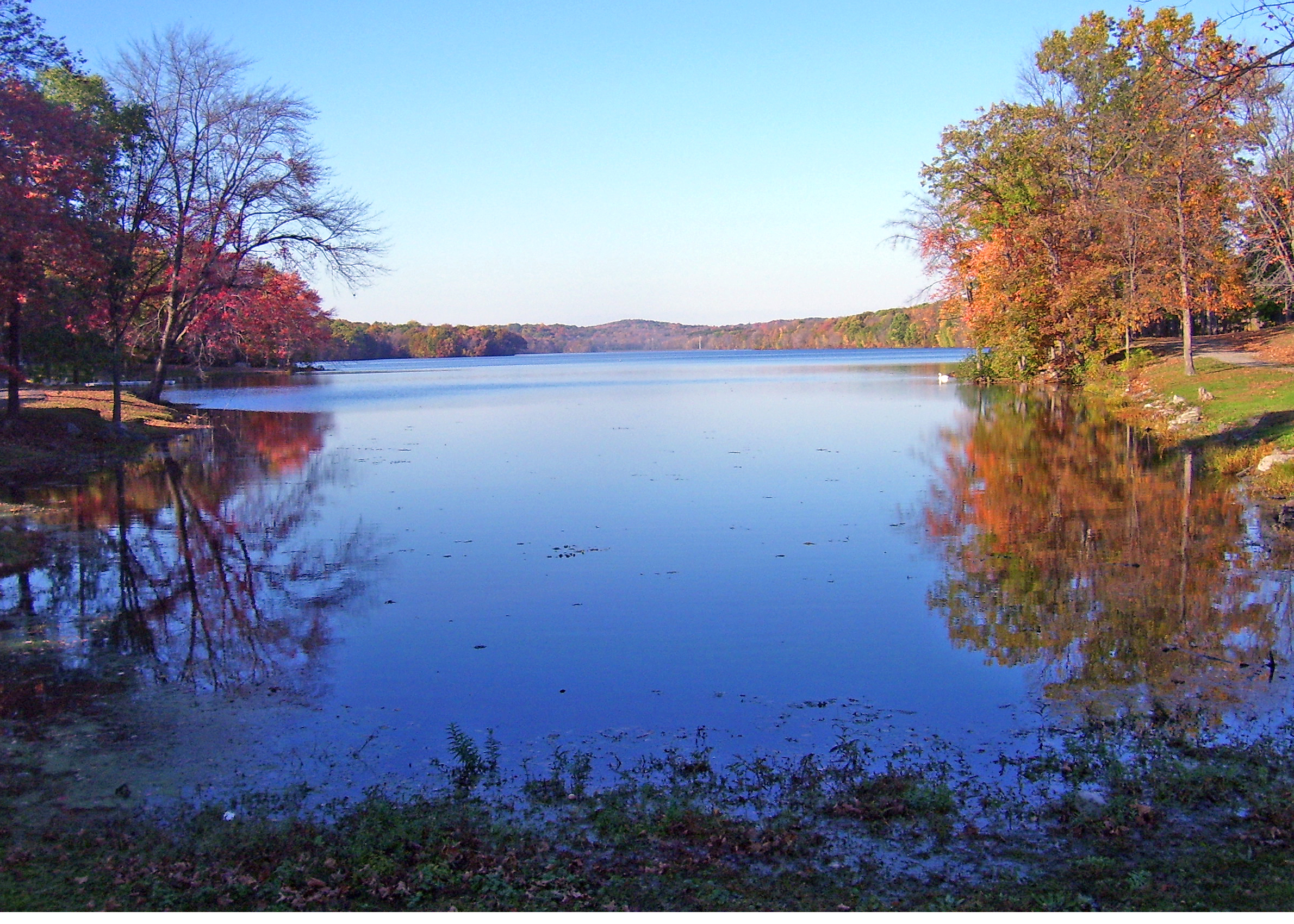
Chadwick Lake

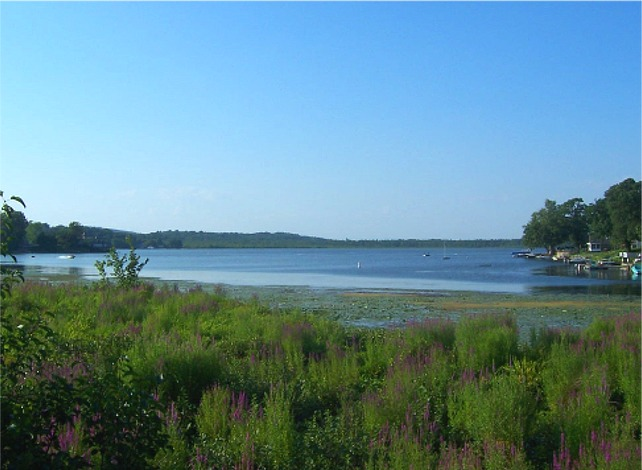
Orange Lake, New York

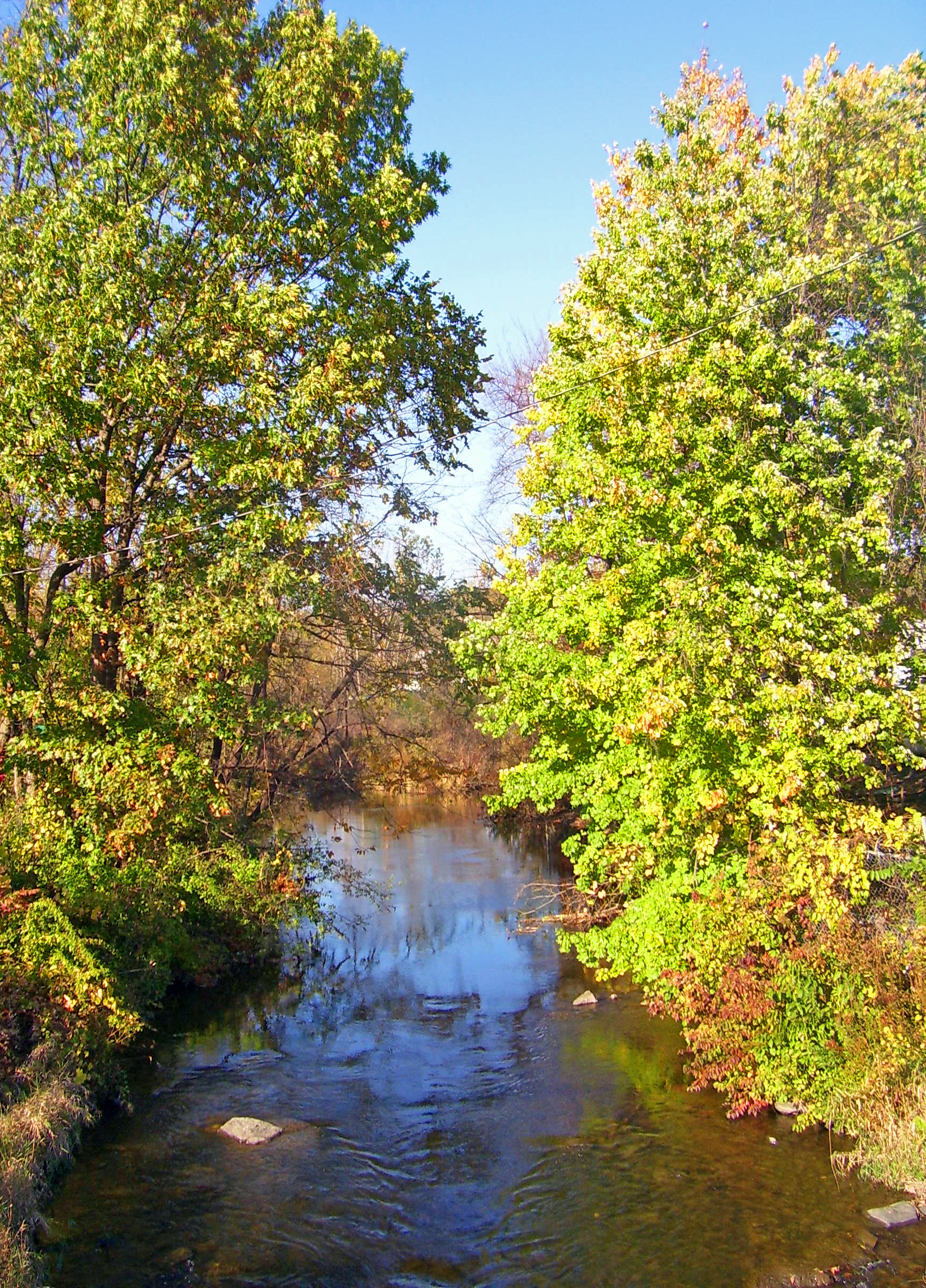
Quassaick Creek

According to the United States Census Bureau, the town has a total area of 47.0 square miles (122 km^{2}), of which 43.7 square miles (113 km^{2}) is land and 3.3 square miles (8.5 km^{2}) (7.04%) is water.

The northern town line and approximately one third of the western town line is the border of Ulster County, and the eastern town line, marked by the Hudson River, is the border of Dutchess County.

The town of Newburgh is bordered on the north by the town of Plattekill (Ulster County) and the town of Marlborough (Ulster County), which includes the hamlet of Marlboro. It is bordered on the west by the town of Shawangunk (Ulster County) which includes the hamlet of Wallkill and by the town of Montgomery (Orange County), which includes the villages of Walden, Montgomery and Maybrook. The entire southern boundary is with the town of New Windsor (Orange County) with the exception of a 4.8-square-mile (12 km^{2}) quadrant, nearly a perfect quadrilateral in shape, adjoining the town at its southeast corner. This is the city of Newburgh. The eastern boundary of the town of Newburgh is the Hudson River, which separates it from the Dutchess County towns of Poughkeepsie, Wappinger, and Fishkill.

=== Topography ===
The town of Newburgh has a hilly terrain. Although bounded on the east by the Hudson River, access to that river is severely limited from the town because most of the shoreline is typified by steep bluffs.

Several hills in the town of Newburgh exceed 750 feet (230 m) above sea level. The southern tip of Marlboro Mountain, most of which including the summit is located in Ulster County, extends southward into the town of Newburgh east of Pressler Road and west of Frozen Ridge Road. While the peak of the mountain in Ulster County is over 1,000 feet (300 m) above sea level, the southernmost extremity of the mountain in the town of Newburgh is over 750 feet (230 m). Fox Hill, in the northwestern corner of the town near the boundary with the town of Shawangunk, also exceeds 750 feet (230 m). Its sister peak of Kings Hill, across Route 300, is also over 750 feet (230 m) high. Straddling the border with the town of Shawangunk, it is dominated by a large Christian cross, lit at night, erected and maintained at the summit by the private property owner.

The most prominent elevation in the town, due to its central location, is Cronomer Hill. The summit of Cronomer Hill, the name of which derives from an Indian chief who allegedly lived atop the hill during Revolutionary War times, is 725 feet (221 m) above sea level. Most of Cronomer Hill is now a park owned and maintained by Orange County and remains heavily forested. The summit, accessible by auto via a road intersecting with Route 32, features an observation tower from which can be seen views of major portions of the mid Hudson Valley, including the Newburgh Beacon Bridge in its entirely, much of Dutchess County across the Hudson, and major portions of Stewart Airport to the southwest, as well as much of the city of Newburgh and town of New Windsor. A cell phone tower is at the summit of Cronomer Hill.

Another prominent elevation in the town is Prospect Hill, behind Fostertown School, about 710 feet (220 m) above sea level. Prospect Hill is traversed on its eastern side by Frozen Ridge Road, so called due to the name popularly given to the steep ridge north of Prospect Hill.

Prospect Hill Road is in the extreme northwest corner of the town of Newburgh, nowhere near Prospect Hill itself.

The two Rossville hills flank either side of New York Route 32 just south of the town border, near the intersection with East Road. They are each about 600 feet (180 m) above sea level. Other elevations in the town of Newburgh worthy of mention are Soap Hill and Cedar Cliff, each overlooking the Hudson in the extreme northeast corner of town. Although each is less than 400 feet (120 m) above sea level, their close proximity to the Hudson River renders them picturesque.

== Demographics ==
Historical population
| Census | Pop. | Note | %± |
|---|---|---|---|
| 1790 | 2,365 | | — |
| 1800 | 3,258 | | 37.8% |
| 1810 | 4,627 | | 42.0% |
| 1820 | 5,812 | | 25.6% |
| 1830 | 6,424 | | 10.5% |
| 1840 | 8,933 | | 39.1% |
| 1850 | 11,425 | | 27.9% |
| 1860 | 15,196 | | 33.0% |
| 1870 | 3,541 | | −76.7% |
| 1880 | 3,918 | | 10.6% |
| 1890 | 4,543 | | 16.0% |
| 1900 | 4,246 | | −6.5% |
| 1910 | 5,132 | | 20.9% |
| 1920 | 4,034 | | −21.4% |
| 1930 | 5,072 | | 25.7% |
| 1940 | 6,092 | | 20.1% |
| 1950 | 8,686 | | 42.6% |
| 1960 | 15,547 | | 79.0% |
| 1970 | 21,593 | | 38.9% |
| 1980 | 22,747 | | 5.3% |
| 1990 | 24,058 | | 5.8% |
| 2000 | 22,866 | | −5.0% |
| 2010 | 29,801 | | 30.3% |
| 2020 | 31,985 | | 7.3% |
U.S. Decennial Census

At the census of 2000, there were 27,568 people, 9,765 households, and 7,519 families residing in the town. The population density was 631.0 inhabitants per square mile (243.6/km^{2}). There were 10,122 housing units at an average density of 231.7 per square mile (89.5/km^{2}). The racial makeup of the town was 85.08% white, 7.56% black or African American, .15% Native American, 2.06% Asian, .03% Pacific Islander, 3.07% from other races, and 2.06% from two or more races. Hispanic or Latino of any race were 9.59% of the population.

There were 9,765 households, out of which 36.4% had children under the age of 18 living with them, 62.6% were married couples living together, 10.2% had a female householder with no husband present, and 23% were non-families. 17.9% of all households were made up of individuals, and 7.1% had someone living alone who was 65 years of age or older. The average household size was 2.80 and the average family size was 3.19.

In the town, the population was spread out, with 26.2% under the age of 18, 6.6% from 18 to 24, 30.1% from 25 to 44, 24.6% from 45 to 64, and 12.6% who were 65 years of age or older. The median age was 38 years. For every 100 females, there were 96.1 males. For every 100 females age 18 and over, there were 92.7 males.

The median income for a household in the town was $60,017, and the median income for a family was $66,706. Males had a median income of $45,398 versus $32,432 for females. The per capita income for the town was $24,749. About 2.4% of families and 3.8% of the population were below the poverty line, including 2.8% of those under age 18 and 6.5% of those age 65 or over.

In 2018, the American Community Survey estimated the town of Newburgh's population to be 30,697. Non-Hispanic whites made up 81.2% of the population, followed by blacks or African Americans (10.1%), American Indian or Alaskan Natives (.1%), Asians (2%), some other race (.2%), and persons of two or more races (2.4%). The Hispanic or Latin American population of any race was 18.8%.

The median income for a household from 2014 to 2018 was $87,602 and the mean income was $105,061, making the town of Newburgh wealthier than the city of Newburgh.

== Education ==
An 1875 map on display at Town Hall indicates that at that time 14 different school districts existed in Newburgh, each of which had its own schoolhouse, each of which elected its own school board, and each of which hired its own teachers. As late as the mid-1950s, it was common in the town for one teacher to teach more than one grade in one classroom.

In the post-World War II era, with the first explosion in population in the town (as the town began the transition from rural to suburban) as well as with "Baby boomers" beginning their schooling, the need came about for larger and more modern school buildings. During the 1950s, new elementary schools were built in Balmville, Gardnertown, East Coldenham, Leptondale and Union Grove. Fostertown School retained its older building, but the first of several modern additions was constructed in 1957.

Each of these elementary schools had their own locally elected school boards. Each had clearly defined boundaries which determined which elementary school each student would attend. Attendance at high school was not universal prior to World War II, but after that time most Newburgh students attended the two junior high schools (North Junior High and South Junior High) and one high school (Newburgh Free Academy, popularly known as NFA) in the city of Newburgh.

In 1963, the Newburgh Enlarged City School District was formed. It consisted of the entire city of Newburgh and most of the town of New Windsor. In addition, it absorbed the following school districts within the town of Newburgh: Balmville (District One), Orange Lake (District Three), Fostertown (District Four), Gardnertown (District Eight), and Union Grove (District Eleven).

Roseton (District Five) and Middlehope (District Nine) joined the Unified Marlboro School District in Ulster County, much to the distress of the Newburgh School officials, who were counting on the tax revenue from the Central Hudson power plants in Roseton, which at the time consisted of about 55% of the total tax base in the town of Newburgh (today that ratio is about 32%).

East Coldenham (District Ten) joined the Valley Central School District, centered in the town of Montgomery.

Leptondale (District Fourteen), due to physical proximity, always sent its students to Wallkill Middle School and Wallkill Senior High School, in Ulster County, which is much closer than Newburgh Free Academy (NFA). For this reason, Leptondale is a part of the Wallkill Central School District. Both schools were built by the Borden family, of dairy fame. In fact, Wallkill Middle School was renamed John G. Borden School in 2004.

There are four different school districts in the town of Newburgh–each of them headquartered in a different surrounding municipality.

The new Meadow Hill Elementary School, built in 1970 in what was at that time the fastest growing portion of the town, replaced Union Grove school, which was eventually demolished.

In the early 1970s, the courts mandated busing to achieve racial balance. In response, the elementary schools in the Newburgh Enlarged City School District, including those within the town of Newburgh, became magnet schools. Geography no longer determines which elementary school each student attends.

School taxes in the Newburgh Enlarged City School District and in the Wallkill School District are still collected by school district tax collectors who are employees of those school districts. School taxes in these districts cannot be accepted by the Receiver of Taxes at Newburgh Town Hall. School taxes in the Marlboro and Valley Central School Districts, on the other hand, must be paid to the Town of Newburgh Receiver of Taxes because these school districts do not have their own tax collectors on their payrolls.

There are a total of 13,027 taxable parcels of property in the town of Newburgh.

== Government ==
The old building on the corner of NY 300 and Gardnertown Road dates back to the early 20th century and was originally Gardnertown Elementary School. When the current school, now called Gardnertown Magnet School, was built in the mid-1950s, this building became Newburgh Town Hall. It remained so until 1973, when the current town hall was built right next door. At that point, the historic old building became police headquarters. When the current police headquarters was built in the late 1980s, adjacent but in the other direction, facing Gardnertown Road, this building became a secondary town hall, housing the code compliance, building, zoning, and planning board offices.

Like all of the towns within New York State, Newburgh is governed by a town board. In Newburgh, the board consists of four councilpersons, and a town supervisor who presides and exercises limited executive authority. The supervisor is elected to a two-year term, in odd numbered years. The four councilpersons are elected to four-year terms, but are staggered so that two are elected in each odd numbered year. A town clerk is also elected to a two-year term, concurrent with the supervisor, and a receiver of taxes is elected to a four-year term. Unlike most towns in New York State, the assessor of real property is not an elected official, but is appointed by the town board. Likewise the superintendent of highways is appointed, not elected. Two town justices are elected to four-year terms: one in odd numbered years; the other (due to a midterm death in 1997) in even numbered years. The town justices (formerly called justices of the peace) are the chief judicial officials of the town, and since 1963 no longer sit as members of the town board, as had previously been the case.

Newburgh is one of twenty towns in Orange County. There are also three cities in Orange County. Despite its size, it is one of only eight towns in the county to contain no incorporated villages.

== Transportation ==
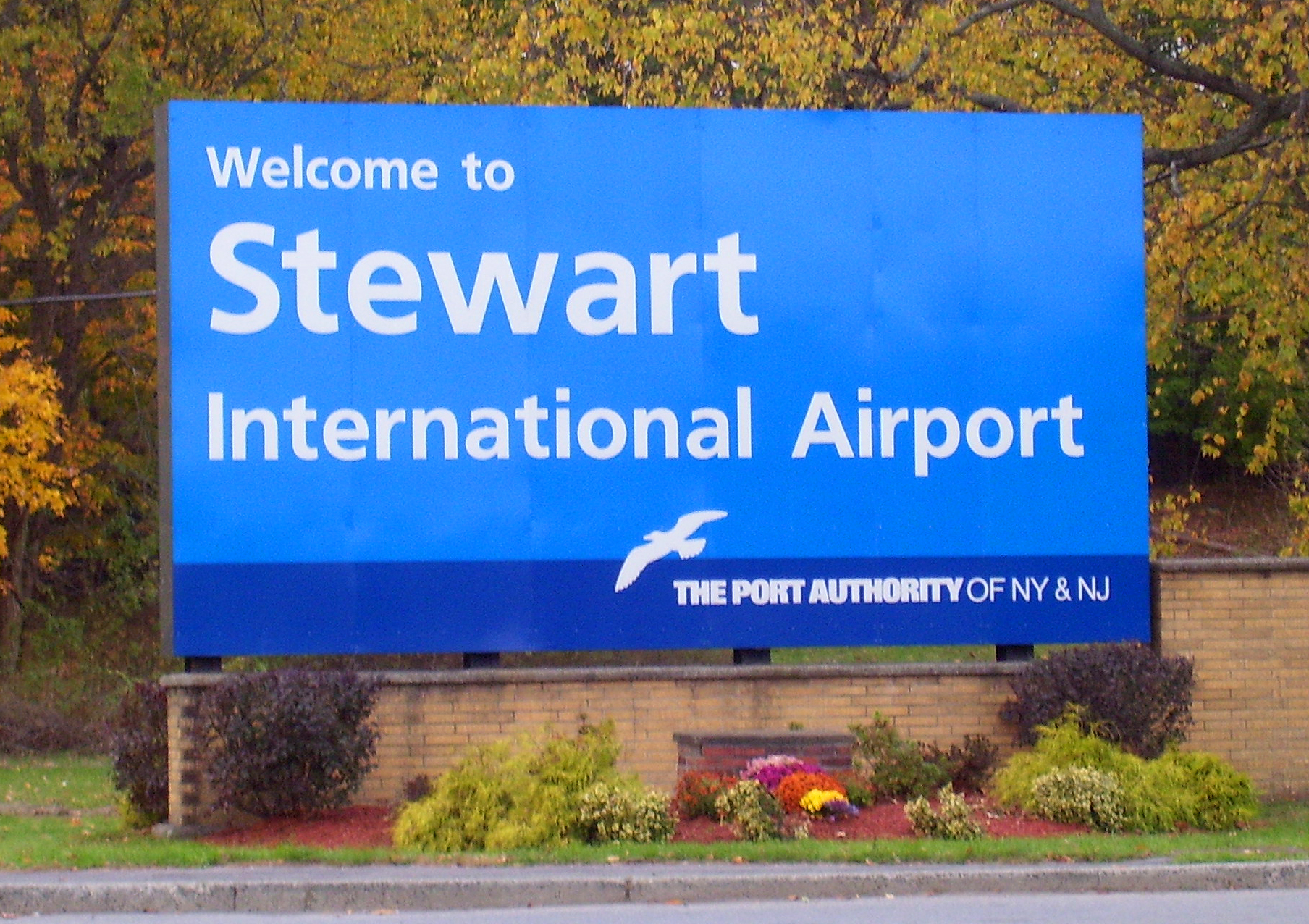
Stewart International Airport

Stewart International Airport is located partially in the town of Newburgh but mostly in the town of New Windsor.

U.S. Route 9W, New York Route 17K, New York Route 32, New York Route 52, New York Route 207 and New York Route 300 all pass through the town. Two roads in the town of Newburgh are owned and maintained by Orange County: County Route 23 (known locally as Rock Cut Road and Forest Road) and County Route 86 (Fostertown Road). All other public roads are maintained by the Town Highway Department, headquartered at 90 Gardnertown Road. However, there are many private roads in the Town of Newburgh.

Interstate 84 passes through from east to west and has a junction with Interstate 87 (the New York State Thruway). In 2011, the NYSDOT administered the milling and repaving of Interstate 84 through the town from the Interstate 87 interchange to the NY 17K exit. This work also included replacing steel bridge joints with epoxy-based bridge joints. The prime contractor was Tilcon New York Inc., a West Nyack, New York based contractor.

Short Line, part of Coach USA, also provides daily service along U.S. Route 9W heading to and from the Port Authority Bus Terminal in Midtown Manhattan and West Point Military Academy.

== Communities and locations in the town ==
- Algonquin Park – Although completely surrounded by the town of Newburgh, this parkland was donated by private developers (who had purchased the property with the intent of building homes on it) to the city of Newburgh for use as a park. Part of the land was purchased and donated to the city by Frederic Delano, a local resident who was the uncle of future President Franklin D. Roosevelt. The Newburgh Lion's Club added land to the donation in the 1930s, and it remained a City of Newburgh park until the mid-1970s, at which time the city could no longer maintain its upkeep. After lying idle for several years, Orange County took it over and today it remains a part of the County Parks and Recreation Department. The ruins of the old gunpowder mill on the parkland is one of only two such remnants in the United States, and is part of the Orange Mill Historic District, the only Historic District within the Town.
- Algonquin Park Boulder – A centerpiece of Algonquin Park had long been a huge boulder which had been in place at least since the Ice Age. Children played on and around it and park patrons of all ages utilized it as a resting place, shade oasis, and a place for meeting. On several occasions the County attempted to remove the boulder, only to face strong opposition from local residents. In the early 1990s, then County Executive Mary McPhillips suggested it be removed for safety reasons. Local historic and civic groups impressed on County officials the landmark status and sentimental value of the boulder and obtained pledges that it would never be removed. In the mid-1990s, a new administration in the County seat again proposed removing the rock, this time for the purpose of constructing a soccer field. The county was presented with petitions signed by over 600 residents asking that the boulder be retained. The then-County Executive, Joseph Rampe, and the Commissioner of Parks, Graham Skea, both pledged that the boulder would never be removed. The soccer field was built just north of Gardnertown Road, also County parkland, so it was assumed there was no longer any threat to the boulder. Then, on the morning of June 25, 2008, the sound of jackhammers alerted neighbors that the boulder was being destroyed. It was soon a pile of rubble. The destruction of the boulder took place on the second to the last day on the job of Parks Commissioner J. Brett Simmons, who succeeded Skea upon the latter's retirement. Simmons informed no one of the decision to remove the boulder—no County official and no Town official. A blasting permit from the Town of Newburgh was not needed because no blasting was involved. County Executive Ed Diana was not informed of the decision to destroy the rock, and in any case was unaware of the pledges made by his predecessors to retain the rock. Local press coverage underscored the outright grief and rage of local park users and historical buffs. Les Cornell, Newburgh Town Historian, noted that the boulder was located in the only historic district within the Town, and questioned if any historic landmark is now safe. But the damage was done and is irreversible.
- Amber Fields – A development built in the late 1980s on the west side of Fletcher Drive North just north of Interstate 84.
- Balmville – A hamlet in the eastern part of the town, immediately north of the city of Newburgh.
- Brighton Green – a condominium townhouse complex on the north side of Meadow Hill Road, across from Meadow Hill Reformed Church at the end of Fletcher Drive North, opened to occupancy in 2007.
- Candlestick Hill – An area along the northern border which until recent years was still completely rural with apple orchards. Since 2000, the site of explosive new home building. A large mobile home park has been located here since the mid-1960s.
- Cedar Cliff – Was a hamlet in the extreme northeast corner of Town, at the point where the Orange-Ulster County border meets the Hudson River. According to old maps, in the late 19th century it had its own post office and school, but today exists only as the name of a hill and of a short dead-end road which runs perpendicular to Old Post Road and the river.
- Cedar Hill Cemetery – an interdenominational cemetery, is the largest cemetery in the Town of Newburgh. It is on the east side of Route 9W, just north of Middle Hope, west of Roseton, and southwest of Cedar Cliff. It was founded in the 1850s. Notables buried there include Andrew Jackson Downing, the landscape architect closely associated with the City of Newburgh, and Eric Carr, drummer for the rock group Kiss.
- Chadwick Lake – A manmade lake in the northwestern part of the town, owned and maintained for recreational purposes by the Town government. It is surrounded by Chadwick Lake Park, a Town park. It is also the secondary water supply for the Town, the first being the Delaware Aqueduct (New York City). The town maintains recreational and park facilities around the southern end of the lake, including playgrounds, picnic facilities, a skating rink and basketball court, a concert stage, and hiking trails, one of which encircles the entire lake. Recreational fishing is allowed, with big mouth bass being the most popular catch in the lake, which is well stocked. The lake is man made. The lake was created when the property owners, the Chadwick family, constructed a dam across Quassaick Creek in 1926. For that reason, the lake does not appear on any 19th-century maps. The Town purchased the lake from the Chadwick Family in 1962 with the intent of using it as a water supply. Some older commercial maps erroneously label the lake "Cronomer Lake" probably due to its proximity to the hamlet of Cronomer Valley and to Cronomer Hill, but there is no evidence that this name was ever used locally for the lake either officially or informally.
- Cronomer Hill Park – owned and maintained by the Orange County Parks and Recreation Department, the portion near the summit of the hill is richly forested. The portion of the park which extends down the southwest slope, to and across Gardnertown Road to Powder Mill Road, includes soccer and baseball fields, and tennis courts. This portion of the park is the site of Town of Newburgh "Community Day" every year the last worknight prior to July 4. It features local vendors and concludes with a fireworks display. The most prominent elevation in the Town, due to its central location, is Cronomer Hill. The summit of Cronomer Hill, the name of which derives from an Indian chief who allegedly lived atop the hill during Revolutionary War times, is 725 feet (221 m) above sea level. Most of Cronomer Hill is now a park owned and maintained by Orange County and remains heavily forested. The summit, accessible by auto via a road intersecting with Route 32, features an observation tower from which can be seen extensive views of major portions of the mid Hudson Valley, including the Newburgh Beacon Bridge in its entirely, much of Dutchess County across the Hudson, and major portions of Stewart Airport to the southwest, as well as much of the City of Newburgh and Town of New Windsor. On a clear day, visible on the horizon, is High Point, the highest point in the state of New Jersey, which is marked by an obelisk. A cell phone tower is at the summit of Cronomer Hill.
- Cronomer Valley – nestled between Fostertown and Cronomer Hill. The confusing, unusual junction of New York State Routes 32 and 300 in the hamlet has locally been known as Holt's Corner in honor of the family which has long owned property and businesses at and near the intersection, members of which live in the vicinity of the intersection to this day. The Cronomer Valley Fire Department is located on Route 32 about 2/10 mile southeast of Holt's Corner.
- Danskammer Point – is a small peninsula which juts into the Hudson River north of Roseton and south of Cedar Cliff, at the base of Soap Hill. "Danskammer" is Dutch for "dance chamber" and was so named by the earliest Dutch settlers because Native Americans would conduct ritual dances by firelight on this point. In the 1930s, the Central Hudson company built the Danskammer Generating Station, an electric generating plant, at this site. The plant was expanded in the 1970s in such a way that it eradicated most of the Hamlet of Roseton. Today, the power complex is owned and operated by the Dynegy company. The plant is oil generated, and the oil crisis of the mid to late 2000s rendered the plant uneconomical to operate. Accordingly, as of 2008, it is off line all but a handful of days a year.
- DuPont Park – an old subdivision laid out in the 1920s, but due to the Great Depression of the 1930s, most of the houses weren't built until the mid-1940s, immediately after World War II. The east–west street is Waring Road (named after original property owners) and the north–south streets were named Innis Avenue and DuPont Avenue. The original subdivision map indicated extremely small building lots by today's standards, but when actual home construction began, larger, more conventional size lots were utilized. Both the original lots and the lots actually used are indicated on the tax maps on file in the Town Assessor's office. The original plans of the subdivision called for a canal to be built equidistant between Innis Avenue and DuPont Avenue, between the backyards of the homes. However, the canal never came to be. In the early 1960s, the town changed the name of DuPont Avenue to Algonquin Drive, to end confusion with the DuPont Avenue in the City of Newburgh. The subdivision is immediately across Powder Mill Road from Algonquin Park, and the original developers intended to extend the subdivision through that land, but instead donated it to the City of Newburgh for use as a park.
- East Coldenham – A hamlet and the site of the East Coldenham Elementary School disaster in 1989. The hamlet is a part of the Valley Central School District. Named after Cadwallader Colden (1688–1776), last Royalist Lieutenant Governor of New York Province prior to the Revolutionary War, and an author, botanist, surveyor and farmer. His home was in the Town of Montgomery a few hundred feet west of the current Town of Newburgh boundary. The large Colden Park housing development, built in the mid-1950s on the south side of Route 17K, and the smaller Fleetwood Development on the opposite side of 17K, are located here. In recent years, the former Colden Park Homeowners Association has encouraged the use of East Coldenham as the name for the entire area. Although Colden Park is an extremely large development, Arbor Drive is the only entrance and exit.
- East Leptondale – A vaguely defined region east of Leptondale and west of Cronomer Valley.
- Fenlo Park – one of the first post-World War II developments in Town, consisted of Stanley Place, Roy Place, Noel Drive, Helene Terrace, and the westernmost part of Chestnut Lane. The homes were built 1953–59. The designation fell into disuse as newer, contiguous developments were built. Stanley, Roy, Noel and Helene were the children of the developer.
- Folin Heights – the old name (which has fallen into disuse) for the Carter Avenue corridor, has views of the Hudson and the valley.
- Fostertown –
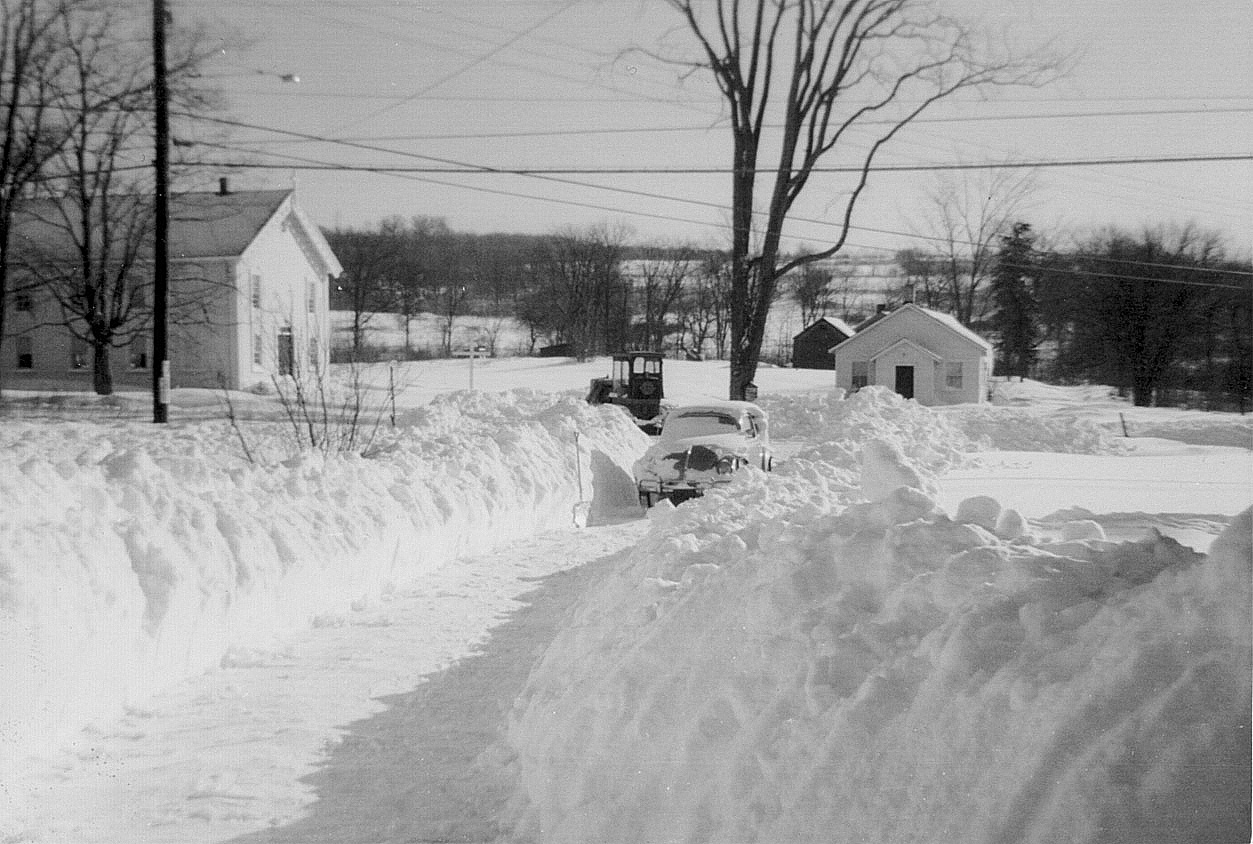
  Fostertown Methodist Church in 1959
  A hamlet centered on the intersection where Fostertown Road, North Fostertown Drive, New Road, Weyants Lane and Owens Road meet. Through the 1950s, a farming community. Gidneytown Creek flows under North Fostertown Drive just north of this intersection, and under Fostertown Road (also known as County Road 86) just east of it. A development, with streets named after Revolutionary War battles (Saratoga Road, Valley Forge Dr., etc.) was built in the 1960s behind Fostertown School to the northeast, going up the side of Prospect Hill. Fostertown Crossing, built in the late 1990s, is directly in back of Fostertown School. The homes in Fostertown Crossing can be described as palatial. The central part of Fostertown School is believed to be the oldest school building still in use in the Town of Newburgh for educational purposes, although additions were built in 1957, 1961, and 1988. A church at the intersection of Fostertown Road and North Fostertown Drive, formerly called Fostertown Methodist, is believed to be the oldest church building still in use for religious purposes in the Town of Newburgh, having been built in 1833. The original Parsonage was built in 1964 and the fellowship hall followed in 1966. On January 1, 1976, Fostertown Methodist Church merged with two other Methodist churches in the Town of Newburgh (Middle Hope and Rossville) to become Trinity United Methodist Parish (see below). An old cemetery connected with the church is north of the church building, on North Fostertown Drive, adjacent to a modern entrance to Fostertown Crossing.
- Fostertown Heights – The region on the ridge just west of Fostertown. Panoramic views of much of the Mid Hudson Valley are still available from along Fostertown Road, south of the Sarvis Lane intersection.
- Frozen Ridge – a bluff with views of the Fostertown valley and the southern tip of Marlboro Mountain, was apple orchards and forest until the late 20th century, and is now experiencing explosive home building.
- Gardnertown – A hamlet named after the Silas Gardner family, whose home is still standing and in private use. Since Gardnertown is the geographic center of the Town of Newburgh, most of the government buildings, including Town Hall, Police Headquarters, and the Code Compliance building, are located here. Gardnertown does not have its own zip code, but a branch of the Newburgh Post Office was located here from 1978 to 2012 in a strip mall.
- Gidneytown – a once prosperous hamlet located at what is now the intersection of Gidney Avenue and Route 32. A grist mill, thriving in the late 18th and throughout the 19th centuries and owned by the Gidney family, was located here on the banks of Gidneytown Creek. Only the brick chimney remains, an historic site which stands on Town owned property. An historical marker on the site recounts a brief history of the Gidney grist mill. This property was the site of a controversial wastewater treatment plant which operated from 1963 until the sewer lines were consolidated and the plant demolished in 1989. This plant was one of several in the Hudson valley targeted by the Riverkeeper organization. The Town of Newburgh Animal Shelter is currently located on this town-owned property. Until the late 1950s, a body of water known as Gidney Pond was a popular local swimming, fishing and ice skating hole. It was filled in after a child drowned. A shopping mall and other commercial and retail establishments are now on the site of Gidney Pond. Another, much smaller, body of water which appears on old Town maps was Grimm's Pond, a local fishing hole on the southwest corner of Gidney Avenue and Gardnertown Road. This former body of water is now marshland traversed by Gidneytown Creek.
- Glenwood Park – A former hamlet which was located around the current site of the Good Will Fire Department.
- Gomez Mill House – the earliest known surviving Jewish residence in the country and the oldest home in Orange County listed on the National Register of Historic Places.
- Hy Vue Terrace – a development built in the mid-1950s on the northeast side of North Plank Road, originally received a great deal of publicity because all the houses were brick. The original streets in the development were Hy Vue Drive, Hy Vue Court, and Hy Vue Circle. Later, Hy Vue Drive was extended up the hill where additional homes were built.
- Leptondale – Northwest corner of the Town. Leptondale is not a part of the Enlarged Newburgh City School District, but is part of the Wallkill School District. Today it remains the most rural part of the Town, although much new housing construction has taken place since 2000. The zip code for the area is 12589. Much of Leptondale is in the Plattekill Fire District. While the main Plattekill fire house is in Ulster County, a substation has recently been built on Forest Road to service Leptondale.
- Meadow Hill – Largest development within the town boundaries. Divided into North, South, and West quadrants. (Meadow Hill East is actually Gardnertown) All street names in Meadow Hill South are related to horses (Pommel Drive, Paddock Place, Coach Lane, etc.) All street names in Meadow Hill North but one are related to royalty or diplomacy (Monarch Drive, Ambassador Lane, Royal Circle, etc.) All street names in Meadow Hill West are British (Victoria Drive, Picadilly Circle, etc.) Was farmland prior to the 1960s. Meadow Hill North is located on property which was a dairy farm owned by the Patton family. It was traversed by an unpaved dirt road known as Patton Road. Today, Patton Road – which follows the exact route of the old unpaved dirt road – is the only thoroughfare in Meadow Hill North not having a royalty or diplomacy related name.
- Meadow Winds – A new development built in the late 1990s and early 2000s on a hill on the south side of Route 52 immediately west of the New York Thruway. It was built on property formerly known as Lawrence Farms. It consists of free standing one family homes, attached town houses, and condominiums, and has views of much of the town.
- Middlehope – A hamlet in the northeast part of the town. Formerly called Middletown because it was halfway between the Newburgh city and the town of Marlborough, the name was changed in the 19th century to avoid confusion with the city called Middletown, also in Orange County. Middlehope was long the center of the apple growing industry in the town of Newburgh, including cold storage facilities. Towards the close of the first decade of the 21st century, the last of the apple orchards have been transformed into housing developments. When the school districts consolidated in 1963, the Middlehope school district opted to consolidate with the Unified Marlboro School District rather than the Newburgh Enlarged City School District. The Middlehope Elementary School was built on Overlook Drive. The Middlehope Fire Department is located on Lattintown Road a few hundred feet west of Route 9W, with a substation to the south, at the corner of 9W and Balmville Road. A Methodist church flourished in Middlehope for many years, until it merged with two other Methodist Churches in the Town of Newburgh to form Trinity United Methodist Parish (see below) in 1976.
- Newburgh and Cochecton Turnpike – one of the oldest roads in the state (1801), it is today New York State Route 17K.
- Newburgh Gardens – an area just north of the hamlet of Glenwood Park, is believed to be the oldest subdivision in the town of Newburgh. The building lots are much smaller than in the rest of the town, streets are narrower, and tax maps indicate many "paper" streets. The older homes are extremely small, although more recently constructed houses can be quite large. Originally, the five north–south thoroughfares in the subdivision were named Dix Avenue, Wilson Avenue, Taft Avenue, Roosevelt Avenue, and Fifth Avenue. In 1912, Woodrow Wilson, William Howard Taft, and Theodore Roosevelt ran against each other for President of the United States. That same year, John Alden Dix was Governor of New York. Accordingly, it is assumed by Town officials and local historic buffs that the subdivision was conceived in or soon after 1912. Dix Avenue was divided into a north section and a south section by the construction of Interstate 84 in 1963, which bisects the neighborhood. Wilson Avenue is today truncated to one block long, Roosevelt Avenue was renamed Schullman Lane to avoid confusion with a Roosevelt Place in the City of Newburgh, and Taft and Fifth Avenues remain today as major, heavily trafficked north–south thoroughfares.
- North Plank Road and South Plank Road were two plank roads, roughly parallel and approximately two miles apart, constructed by competing turnpike companies in the 1840s. Tolls were charged on both of these roads. Both began at what is now the City of Newburgh limits and extended westward into the Shawangunk and eventually Catskill Mountains. Today, North Plank Road is designated as New York State Route 32 from Route 9W as far as Holt's Corner in Cronomer Valley, after which point it is designated Route 300. South Plank Road is New York State Route 52 its entire length. The U.S. Postal Service still recognizes North Plank Road as the official address for all mail along the Route 32 portion of the highway, as do the local government and emergency services. This is despite the fact that there is not one single sign identifying the thoroughfare as North Plank Road anywhere on its entire length. Mail addressed to recipients beyond Cronomer Valley must be addressed to Route 300, and will be returned to sender if addressed North Plank Road. (This determination was made as a part of the "911" emergency system renumbering in the mid-1990s.) The Postal Service, local government, and emergency services recognize South Plank Road as the official designation for that entire road, even though, just as is the case with North Plank Road, there is no signage whatsoever the entire length of the highway identifying it as such. From 1895 until 1926, an electric railway ran along South Plank Road from downtown city of Newburgh through the entire length of the Town of Newburgh to the Village of Walden to the west. This electric railway (popularly referred to as the trolley) was a major factor in the success of the amusement park at Orange Lake. There are three side roads designated as Old South Plank Road---one in Gardnertown, one in Orange Lake, and one at the Montgomery Town line. Contrary to local belief, these are not shunpike roads but were the location of South Plank Road prior to the state takeover and paving in the 1920s. Likewise there is an Old North Plank Road. A tavern located on that road claims to be a former toll house from the turnpike days. Another side road, Paffendorf Drive, was known as Old North Plank Road until the early 1960s, when the name was changed to avoid confusion.
- Orange Lake – A lake in the western part of the town. At 440 acres (1.8 km^{2}), it is believed to be the largest lake located entirely within Orange County.
- Orange Lake – A hamlet east of Orange Lake. It was a resort area prior to World War II, and the site of an amusement park prior to 1941. Prior to 1950, a night club on the shore of the lake attracted internationally known performers, such as Frank Sinatra and Benny Goodman. The hamlet is the site of Our Lady of the Lake, one of two Roman Catholic mission churches in the Town of Newburgh. It is also the location of the Dan Leghorn Volunteer Fire Department, founded around 1900.
- Plattekill Turnpike – One of the oldest roads in the Town of Newburgh, appearing on the earliest available maps, it began in the hamlet of Gardnertown just east of the point where Gardnertown Road crosses Quassaick Creek. It proceeded north parallel to the creek, and intersected with North Plank Road in the hamlet of Cronomer Valley at what later became known as Holt's Corner. It then continued north, still parallel to and east of Quassaick Creek, through the hamlet of Savilton (Rossville) and across the Ulster County line into the Town of Plattekill. In the 1920s, the portion north of North Plank Road was designated New York State Route 32. Because Plattekill Turnpike terminated at Gardnertown Road, it could not be used as a cross-town north–south thoroughfare. Union Avenue, however, did extend south into the Town of New Windsor. In order to proceed from Plattekill Turnpike southbound onto Union Avenue southbound, it was necessary to make a sharp right onto Gardnertown Road, continue for half a mile northwest to Gardnertown Church, and then make a sharp left onto Union Avenue. Sometime between 1935 and 1946, Orange County constructed a new road, designated as Union Avenue Extension, as a short cut to eliminate those sharp turns and cut the travel distance in half. The County took over this entire Plattekill Turnpike-Union Avenue Extension-Union Avenue corridor and designated it County Route 28. It quickly became a major north–south thoroughfare. The remainder of Plattekill Turnpike not a part of this corridor, a short stub just north of Gardnertown Road, became a seldom used secondary road. In the early 1980s, the state took over County Route 28 (as well as all of Union Avenue south of Route 52) and redesignated it New York Route 300. Finally, with the adoption of the 911 Emergency renumbering system in the mid-1990s, the name Plattekill Turnpike was totally discontinued and suppressed for all official and postal purposes, with the exception of the small stub south of the former Union Avenue Extension. This small Town road, on which are located Gardnertown Elementary School and about half a dozen houses, is still called Plattekill Turnpike to the consternation of newer residents, since it is not located anywhere near, nor does it lead to, the Town of Plattekill. It also has caused difficulty for persons seeking the Town of Newburgh Justice Court Building, which for many years used to be 105 Plattekill Turnpike. The same building is now designated 311 Route 32.
- Powelton Club – an exclusive private country club in the Hamlet of Balmville, it is one of the ten oldest country clubs in the United States and is on the National Register of Historic Places.
- Powelton Farms – a development begun in the mid-1950s and which includes the westernmost part of the old Powelton estate, owned for many years by the Ramsdell family. The eastern part of this estate became the Powelton Club in the 1880s. The new routing of Route 9W cut through the center of the estate in the late 1920s. Powelton Farms is the part of the estate west of Route 9W but east of the old Gidney estate. The streets include Powelton Road and Powelton Circle, as well as Sunset Drive, Meadow Street, Chadwick Place, Hideaway Lane, and Catalpa Road. Winding Lane, despite its name, is straight from its beginning on Route 32 to its termination at Catalpa Road. However, old maps at Town Hall indicate that the farm road which was its precursor included the easternmost part of Catalpa Road, which was extremely "winding". It is probably from this, rather than a sense of irony or sarcasm, that "Winding Lane" got its name. Powelton Farms was originally a part of the old Balmville school district and to this day its residents consider themselves Balmville residents. Rob Cohen, the noted motion picture director and producer, grew up in this neighborhood.
- Quassaick Creek – Although mostly known locally as the boundary between the city of Newburgh and town of New Windsor, actually most of the flow of Quassaick Creek is in the town of Newburgh. Made national headlines in the 1980s due to the anti-pollution efforts of Robert F. Kennedy Jr. and his Riverkeeper organization.
- Roseton – for all practical purposes, no longer exists. It was for many years a thriving community anchored around the highly successful brick yards (The Rose Brick Company and The Jova Brick Company) along the banks of the Hudson. It had its own elementary school, grocery store and post office, and even had its own ZIP code (12576) until the mid-1970s. After the brick yards shut down, the Central Hudson Gas & Electric Company purchased them and most of the private property for expansion of its power plants, and demolished all of the homes east of River Road – almost the entire community. Those power plants were sold to the Dynegy energy company in the late 1990s. Our Lady of Mercy chapel, a mission church of St. Mary's Parish in Marlboro, long served the Roman Catholic community in Roseton. It is still in service, and while it has offered only one Mass per week since the expansion of the power plants, most times the Mass is standing room only. It is one of two Roman Catholic Mission Churches in the Town of Newburgh, the other being Our Lady of the Lake at Orange Lake. New York State DOT directional signs erected on Route 9W in late 2015 point to the hamlet of Roseton indicating correctly that it is one mile (1.6 km) to the east. These replace earlier sings which were confusing. In 1963, the Roseton School District opted to join the Unified Marlboro School District instead of the Newburgh Enlarged City School District, depriving the Newburgh school district of millions of dollars in taxes paid by the power plants. Soon after, Roseton Elementary School was demolished, with the students being sent to the new Middle Hope Elementary School on Overlook Drive.
- Rossville – Rossville is a former hamlet on what is now New York Route 32, just south of the Ulster County border, around the intersection with East Road. All that remains of Rossville as a place name are the building of the former Rossville Methodist Church, now maintained as The Rossville Library Museum, and the Rossville Cemetery, formerly maintained by the church. The congregation of Rossville Methodist Church moved to the former Fostertown Methodist Church when the two merged, with Middle Hope Methodist Church, to form Trinity United Methodist Parish (see below) in 1976.
- Savilton – Savilton and Rossville are the same place. In the 19th century, when postmasters were allowed to choose their own names for post offices, the names switched back and forth as two different postmasters each named the community after their sons.
- Sherwood Forest – a small development laid out in the late 1950s but built in the early 1960s. The original streets all have names taken from the Robin Hood legend (Nottingham Road, Archery Road, Little John Lane, Yeoman Road), as is the name of the development itself. The only outlet from the subdivision is via Innis Avenue and Algonquin Drive, which merge at the entrance to the subdivision.
- Trinity United Methodist Parish – one body of Christian Fellowship incorporated on January 1, 1976, with the merger of the Fostertown, Middlehope, and Rossville Methodist Churches. The congregation gathers for worship at the former Fostertown Methodist Church, built in 1833 and believed to be the oldest building in the town still used for religious purposes. The church is adjoined by a fellowship hall built in 1966, and a parsonage built in 1964. This church remains today the center of all activity for Trinity Parish. A very short distance to the north of the church building is Fostertown Cemetery, which is maintained by the church. The history of Methodism in Newburgh dates back to 1786 when the Reverend Ezekiel Cooper came to preach at the invitation of Mrs. Arthur Smith, still known to this day as "The Mother of Methodism" in Newburgh. The first Methodist Church in Middle Hope was built in 1822 and was known as the Asbury Chapel. In 1885, the church moved three miles to the north to a building originally built by Presbyterians, and in 1965 moved to Carter Avenue, where the congregation remained until the merger eleven years later. The Rossville Church, built in 1831, is still standing and is now the site of the Rossville Memorial Library.
- Union Grove – also no longer exists. It was a rural hamlet near the junction of Routes 17K and 300 (formerly known as Union Avenue). Today it is wholly commercial. The former Fleet Bank Building, housing commercial offices and currently the Finkelstein and Associates law firm, is the tallest building in the town. It stands on the site of the Union Grove Elementary School, demolished in the early 1980s.
- Wedgewood Park – a development just south of Brewer Road, was planned since the early 1960s but was not finally built until the late 1980s. All of the streets are named after states (Ohio Drive, Vermont Drive, Maine Drive, etc.) The development is prominently visible from the summit of Cronomer Hill.
- Winona Lake – an area around upper and lower Winona Lake along Route 52. The upper lake dried out and became a marshland in the 1960s. The lower lake has also fallen into disrepair due to the recent failure of a man-made dam built in the 1930s. The local homeowners association is debating what action to take towards restoring the lake and is seeking governmental assistance in doing so. The Winona Lake Fire Engine Company is actually located west of the hamlet, closer to Gardnertown. For this reason some commercial maps mislabel the small lake in Algonquin Park as Winona Lake. An elementary school formerly stood on Winona Avenue. Today, this building is occupied by the Penuel Pentecostal Tabernacle.

== Notable people ==
- William W. Belknap (1829–1890), Secretary of War under President Ulysses S. Grant, is the only Cabinet official in American history to be impeached.
- Augustus W. Bennet (1897–1983), resident and practicing attorney in the Newburgh area throughout his adult life, was a Member of the U.S. Congress (1945–1947) and is buried in the mausoleum in Cedar Hill Cemetery.
- Lawrence E. Bennett (1923–2016), World War II hero, Town Councilman (1973–1978), Town Supervisor (1978–1982), and New York State Assemblyman (1982–1994).
- Eric Carr (1950–1991), drummer with the rock group Kiss, is buried in Cedar Hill Cemetery.
- Kenneth Casey (1899–1965), composer, publisher, author and child actor, best remembered as the lyricist of the 1925 hit song Sweet Georgia Brown, lived on Lakeside Road in the hamlet of Orange Lake.
- Rob Cohen (born 1949), film director and producer, while born in nearby Cornwall, lived with his family in the Powelton Farms section of Town; educated in the Newburgh public school system, 1967 graduate of Newburgh Free Academy (NFA).
- The Delano family lived in its principal estate, Algonac, approximately at the site of what is now Susan Drive in Balmville.
- Thomas C. Desmond (1887–1972) made a fortune as a shipbuilder during World War I. He founded the Newburgh Ship Yards, which built many of the transport ships vital to the American Expeditionary Force. Among the ships built there was the USS Newburgh (ID-1369). He built the Colonial Terrace section of Newburgh in 1917 to house his workers. Later, he served in the New York State Senate (1930–1958). He lived in a palatial estate in Balmville, located between Albany Post Road and River Road. After his death, his widow Alice Curtis Desmond (1897–1991), a successful author of biographies of Revolutionary War era personalities and professional photographer, married former U.S. Congressman Hamilton Fish III (1888–1991). They subsequently divorced. When she died in 1991, she willed the estate to Mount Saint Mary College. Both the Center for Community Education Service and Learning Is Forever Enriching (LIFE) program offices are located at the Mount's Desmond Campus.
- Andrew Jackson Downing (1815–1852), landscape architect closely associated with the City of Newburgh, is buried in Cedar Hill Cemetery, in the Town of Newburgh.
- Michael C. Gross (1945–2015), graphic artist, designer, and motion picture producer, designed many covers of the National Lampoon (magazine) during his tenure as that magazine's art director, and created the iconic logo for the motion picture Ghostbusters (1984).
- William S. Hart (1864–1946), a classically trained Shakespearean actor, parlayed his fame on the Broadway stage to become a star, after the age of 40, of silent movies. He was the first motion picture cowboy, known for insisting on historic authenticity. He retired as a millionaire to his ranch outside Hollywood before the dawn of the talkies. He was born in the old United States Hotel along the waterfront in what is now the City of Newburgh which at the time had not yet separated from the Town.
- James D. Hughes, known as "Don" Hughes (1922–2024), Air Force General, who was chief military aide to Richard M. Nixon during the latter's second term as vice president, and again during his subsequent presidency. He was born in and lived most of his life in the Balmville section of the Town of Newburgh, in later years on Dogwood Lane.
- George Inness (1825–1894), 19th century painter, was born on a farm in the Town of Newburgh.
- Joseph John Jova (1916–1993), a member of the family who owned the Jova Brick Yards in Roseton, was a professional diplomat who served as U.S. Ambassador to Honduras (1965–1969), U.S. Representative to the Organization of American States (1969–1973) and U.S. Ambassador to Mexico (1973–1977). After he retired, he was President of Meridian International Center (1977–1989).
- Ellsworth Kelly (1923–2015), noted painter, sculptor, and printmaker associated with hard-edge painting.
- Margaret Leech (1893–1974), winner of two Pulitzer Prizes for history, was born and raised in the Town of Newburgh, and maintained a home there throughout her life.
- Sara Ann Delano Roosevelt (1854–1941), a member of the Delano family and the mother of Franklin D. Roosevelt, the 32nd President of the United States, was born and raised at Algonac, the Delano Estate, which was roughly where Susan Drive is now, in Balmville.
- Mickey Spillane (1918–2006), best-selling author, built a house off of Rock Cut Road soon after World War II. It was there that he wrote the first of his crime novels, and he continued to reside there well into the 1950s.
- Thomas Vonn (born 1975), former alpine ski racer with U.S. Ski Team. Primarily a giant slalom racer, Vonn's best finish in international competition was in the Super-G at the 2002 Winter Olympics, where he placed ninth. He was the husband of champion ski racer Lindsey Vonn, the World Cup overall champion in 2008 and 2009 and 2010 Olympic gold medalist. Their divorce was finalized in January 2013. The Vonn family lived in the Balmville section of Town. Thomas attended Northwood School, a prep school in upstate New York.
- John E. Wool (1784–1869), professional military officer in the U.S. Army who served in three consecutive wars: the War of 1812, the Mexican War. and the Civil War.
- Lenny Wolpe (born 1951), acclaimed star of Broadway musicals such as Wicked and The Drowsy Chaperone, and countless television and movie appearances, was born and lived his early years in the City of Newburgh, but lived in Town of Newburgh throughout his teens. He is a 1969 graduate of NFA.
- Orange County Choppers The headquarters of the custom motorcycle manufacturer which is the centerpiece of the nationally broadcast reality TV show American Chopper is on Route 17K, about 4/10 of a mile west of Route 300. The new building is clearly visible from the New York State Thruway and is readily accessible via Exit 17 of that superhighway. Paul Teutul Sr., Paul Teutul Jr., and Michael Teutul are combining and relocating their production facility and retail store from the adjacent Town of Montgomery. The grand opening of the new International Headquarters of Orange County Choppers took place April 24 to 27, 2008.
