= Newburgh Enlarged City School District =

Public school district in Newburgh, New York

Address
- 124 Grand Street Newburgh, New York, 12550; United States

District information
- Type: Public
- Grades: PreK–12
- NCES District ID: 3620700

Students and staff
- Students: 11,243 (2020–2021)
- Teachers: 913.74 (on an FTE basis)
- Staff: 742.26 (on an FTE basis)
- Student–teacher ratio: 12.3:1

Other information
- Website: www.newburghschools.org

The Newburgh Enlarged City School District (NECSD) is a public school district located in Newburgh, New York. It encompasses all of the City of Newburgh, most of the towns of Newburgh and New Windsor, and small sections of the towns of Cornwall and Walkill. The enrollment is 12,791 students in 13 schools in grades K-12.

In addition to Newburgh, it includes the following census-designated places: Balmville, Gardnertown, and Vails Gate, as well as most of the New Windsor CDP and portions of the Orange Lake CDP.

It is a separate governmental body from the city government of Newburgh, and as such the city government does not have power over the school district.

== History ==
As was the case with most rural upstate towns in New York, a series of schoolhouses (in most cases, one room) sprang up throughout Newburgh in the 19th century, in response to the state laws of 1812 and 1814 requiring the establishment of such schools and school districts. The number of these rural school districts in New York peaked statewide at 11,750 in 1865.

New York state legislation required that the administration of schools would be in the hands of school districts — not the counties or towns, as is the case in 20 other states. This system of school districts totally independent of municipal or county governments remains in place throughout all of New York (except for New York City) today.

From 1925 on, New York encouraged school districts to consolidate and approved legislation, featuring the incentive of state financial aid, to facilitate this. However, as late as 1960, there were still nine elementary school districts, and nine elementary schools, in the town. (The missing district numbers on the following chart are those of school districts previously consolidated with neighboring districts.)

The following are the nine school districts as they existed in 1960:

- District One: Balmville
- District Three: Orange Lake
- District Four: Fostertown
- District Five: Roseton
- District Eight: Gardnertown
- District Nine: Middle Hope
- District Ten: East Coldenham
- District Eleven: Union Grove
- District Fourteen: Leptondale

== See also ==
- Newburgh Free Academy
