= Orange Lake, New York =

Orange Lake
- CDP
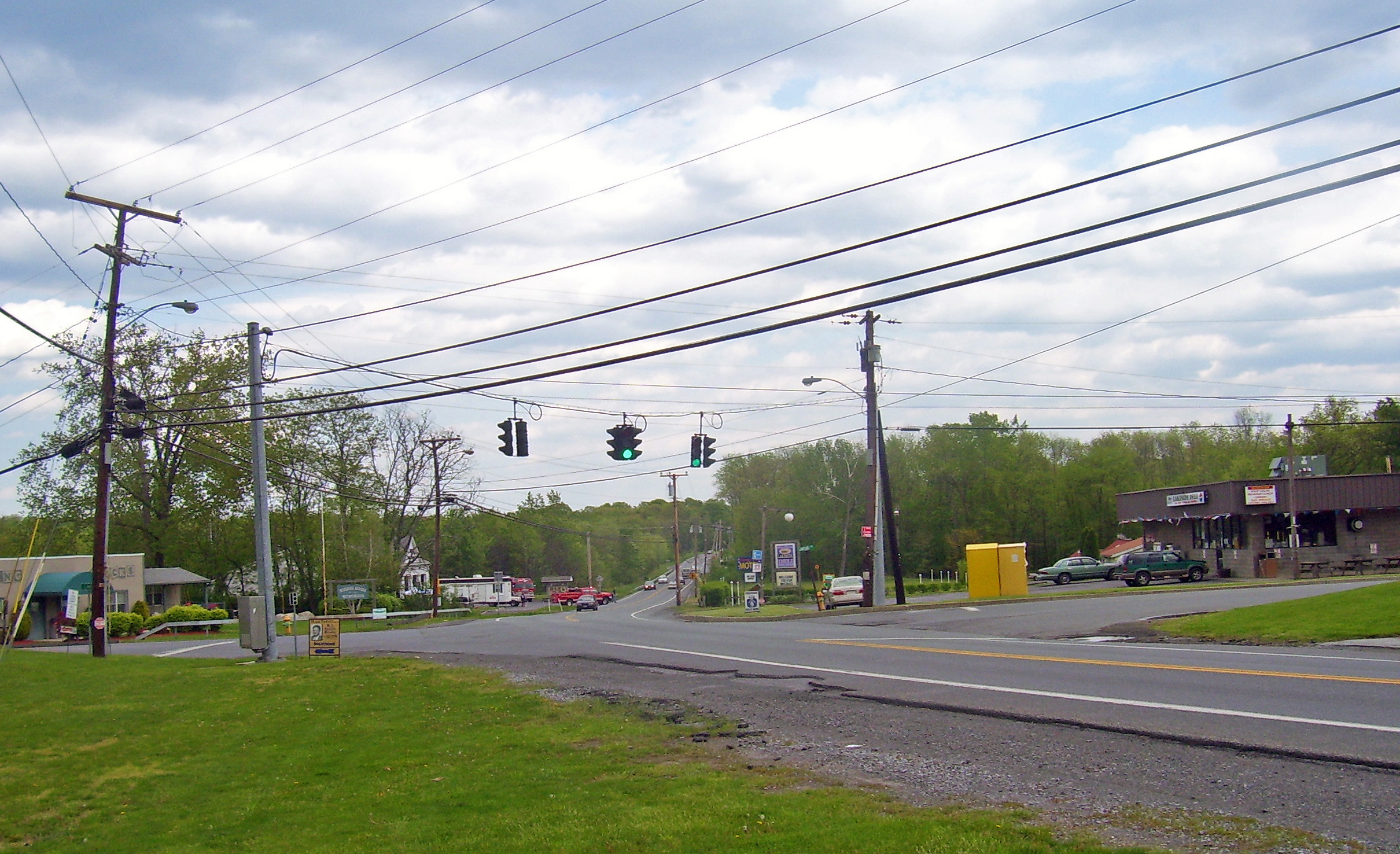
- Center of Orange Lake, looking east along NY 52
- Etymology: from county and nearby lake
- Location in Orange County and the state of New York.
- Coordinates: 41°31′57″N 74°5′47″W
- Country: United States
- State: New York
- Region: Hudson Valley
- County: Orange

Area
  - Total: 9.18 sq mi (23.78 km^{2})
  - Land: 8.73 sq mi (22.62 km^{2})
  - Water: 0.45 sq mi (1.16 km^{2})
- Elevation: 492 ft (150 m)

Population (2020)
  - Total: 9,770
  - Density: 1,118.7/sq mi (431.93/km^{2})
- Time zone: UTC-5 (Eastern (EST))
  - Summer (DST): UTC-4 (EDT)
- ZIP Code: 12550
- Area code: 845
- FIPS code: 36-55189
- GNIS feature ID: 0959430

Orange Lake is a hamlet (and census-designated place) in Orange County, New York, United States. The population was 9,770 at the 2020 census. It is part of the Kiryas Joel–Poughkeepsie–Newburgh, NY Metropolitan Statistical Area as well as the larger New York–Newark–Bridgeport, NY-NJ-CT-PA Combined Statistical Area.

The community of Orange Lake is in the western part of the Town of Newburgh, located on the east side of a lake also called Orange Lake.

== Geography ==
Orange Lake is located at 41°31′57″N 74°5′47″W (41.532593, -74.096388). It is along NY 52.

According to the United States Census Bureau, the CDP has a total area of 6.0 square miles (16 km^{2}), of which 5.4 square miles (14 km^{2}) is land and 0.6 square miles (1.6 km^{2}) (10.67%) is water.

== Demographics ==
Historical population
Census	Pop.	Note	%±
2000	6,085		—
2010	6,982		14.7%
2020	9,770		39.9%
U.S. Decennial Census

As of the census of 2000, there were 6,085 people, 2,016 households, and 1,628 families residing in the CDP. The population density was 1,134.2 inhabitants per square mile (437.9/km^{2}). There were 2,104 housing units at an average density of 392.2 per square mile (151.4/km^{2}). The racial makeup of the CDP was 80.30% White, 12.56% African American, 0.07% Native American, 1.46% Asian, 3.16% from other races, and 2.47% from two or more races. Hispanic or Latino of any race were 12.11% of the population.

There were 2,016 households, out of which 36.8% had children under the age of 18 living with them, 66.4% were married couples living together, 10.8% had a female householder with no husband present, and 19.2% were non-families. 15.2% of all households were made up of individuals, and 5.7% had someone living alone who was 65 years of age or older. The average household size was 2.91 and the average family size was 3.24.

In the CDP, the population was spread out, with 25.7% under the age of 18, 6.5% from 18 to 24, 28.5% from 25 to 44, 26.4% from 45 to 64, and 12.9% who were 65 years of age or older. The median age was 39 years. For every 100 females, there were 98.4 males. For every 100 females age 18 and over, there were 91.4 males.

The median income for a household in the CDP was $58,321, and the median income for a family was $65,190. Males had a median income of $39,861 versus $30,729 for females. The per capita income for the CDP was $22,351. About 2.1% of families and 2.9% of the population were below the poverty line, including 2.1% of those under age 18 and 8.1% of those age 65 or over.

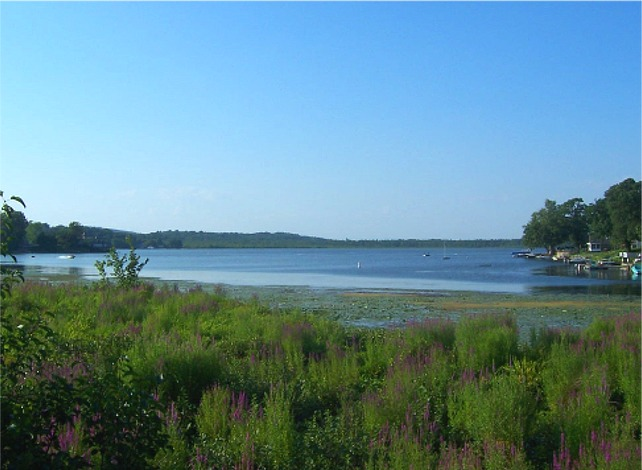
Orange Lake

== History ==
The Native Americans called the lake "Oussuk", meaning "stony pond." The Dutch settlers called it "Binnin", meaning "water within land" or "water between other waters". In 1684, Gov. Thomas Donegan purchased the lake and surrounding territory from the Native Americans and divided this patent into numerous farms, most especially dairy farms. At the time of the Revolutionary War, a man named Capt. Thomas Machin owned and operated a saw mill, grist mill, and finally a mint in what is now the hamlet, at the very beginning of the outlet stream. An historical marker marks the site of Machin's Mill on Lakeside Road. At that time, the lake began to be called Machin's Pond. In the 1830s, a local clergyman named James R. Willson began calling the lake Orange Lake. The reasons for this name change remain obscure, but are probably related to its location in Orange County. One source claims that the fact that the lake was round like an orange was also a factor. Local legend states that many residents objected to this name change, but it did stick and remains the name of the lake and the hamlet to this day.

Because the lake is 800 feet (240 m) above sea level, its outlet stream (sometimes called Bushfield Creek) became a very popular site of mills. The largest was the Newburgh Bleachery, owned and operated by the Chadwick Family.

During the 19th century, the shores of the lake became a popular location for summer cottages. Transportation to the lake and the hamlet was difficult until 1895, when trolley service was established between the City of Newburgh and the Village of Walden, and Orange Lake, approximately the halfway point, became a popular stop. Soon after this Newburgh and Walden Electric Railway initiated service, a highly successful amusement park opened on the south shore of the lake. The trolley line went out of business in 1926. The amusement park went out of business during the Great Depression and was demolished in 1941.

A one-room schoolhouse was built for local children in 1849. The building remained basically unchanged until indoor plumbing was added in 1952. When the Orange Lake school system voted to merge with the Newburgh Enlarged City School District in 1963, the schoolhouse was closed and sold. as of 2012, a sharp and young couple reside in the schoolhouse.

Our Lady of the Lake Roman Catholic chapel, a mission church of St. Patrick's parish in the City of Newburgh, was constructed in 1939 and remains in active service today. Prior to the construction of the current chapel, Roman Catholic services were held in the ice house at Lakeview House. The Dan Leghorn Fire Department was organized around 1900.

Pine Point was a highly successful resort on a peninsula off the southern shore of the lake. During the big band era, many nationally known recording acts appeared at the resort, including Frank Sinatra and Benny Goodman. It opened for business in 1896, and was closed and demolished in 1953. Lakeview House on Lakeside Road originally opened in 1866 as a boarding house, and did business as O'Malley's Bar for many years. Today, it continues to do business as a restaurant under its original name.

In the late 1940s Mickey Spillane and a friend of his from the Army bought a woodlot on Rock Cut Road and lived in a house they built while he was writing for comic books. During that time he wrote I, The Jury, his first novel.

== Education ==
The CDP is divided between the Valley Central School District (Montgomery), the Newburgh City School District, and the Wallkill Central School District. The comprehensive high school of the Newburgh district is Newburgh Free Academy.
