= Walker Valley (disambiguation) =

Walker Valley is a geographic feature in the Prince Charles Mountains in Antarctica.

Walker Valley may also refer to:

- Walker Valley, New York
- Walker Valley High School
