= New York State Route 52 =

State highway in southern New York, US

New York State Route 52
- NY 52 highlighted in red, NY 52A in blue, NY 52 Business in pink (Darker blue maintained as NY 980J)

Route information
- Maintained by NYSDOT, JIBC, NYSBA, and Sullivan County
- Length: 108.72 mi (174.97 km)
- Existed: 1930–present

Major junctions
- West end: PA 652 at the Pennsylvania state line in Narrowsburg
- NY 97 in Narrowsburg; NY 55 in Liberty; Future I-86 / NY 17 in Liberty; NY 42 in Woodbourne; US 209 in Ellenville; I-84 from Newburgh to Fishkill; US 9W / NY 32 in Newburgh; US 9 in Fishkill; NY 82 in Brinckerhoff; Taconic State Parkway in East Fishkill
- East end: US 6 in Carmel

Location
- Country: United States
- State: New York
- Counties: Sullivan, Ulster, Orange, Dutchess, Putnam

Highway system
- New York Highways; Interstate; US; State; Reference; Parkways
← NY 51	NY 52	→ NY 53

New York State Route 52 (NY 52) is a 108.72-mile-long (174.97 km) state highway in the southeastern part of the state. It generally runs from west to east through five counties, beginning at the Pennsylvania state line in the Delaware River near Narrowsburg, crossing the Hudson River on the Newburgh–Beacon Bridge, and ending in Carmel. NY 52 and NY 55, both major east–west routes of the Mid-Hudson Region, run parallel to each other, intersecting in downtown Liberty.

With the exception of the section overlapping Interstate 84 (I-84), most of Route 52 is a two-lane road through lightly developed rural areas. The road west of the Hudson River serves a number of small communities in the southern Catskills and Hudson Valley, such as the villages of Jeffersonville, Ellenville and Walden. East of the Hudson, it closely parallels I-84 after leaving it at the village of Fishkill. It once passed through the cities of Newburgh and Beacon, following a ferry between them, but since the bridge's construction Route 52 runs concurrently with I-84 just to their north.

Much of what is today Route 52 was built as private turnpikes in the early 19th century. After their operating companies folded later in the century, the state took over the roads in the 1890s. While some portions of today's Route 52 were included in New York's first designations of state highways, it was not until a 1930 renumbering that Route 52 took that number.

At that time it followed most of its present alignment, but continued east of its present terminus to NY 22. The truncation to its junction with US 6 in Carmel came later in the 1930s, along with an exchange of alignments between routes 52 and 216. When the Newburgh-Beacon Bridge was opened in the early 1960s, Route 52 was rerouted onto I-84, bypassing a route to the ferry landings in Newburgh and Beacon. The alignment to I-84 in the latter city is today Route 52 Business.

== Route description ==
=== Sullivan County ===
A little over half of NY 52's total mileage is in Sullivan County, due to its circuitous route in the less developed western half of the county, where some segments are maintained by the county rather than the state. East of Liberty, the route takes a more direct course toward its highest elevation, in the part of the county that is more dominated by resorts and summer camps.

==== Narrowsburg to Jeffersonville ====
NY 52 begins at the midpoint of the Narrowsburg–Darbytown Bridge over the Delaware River as a county-maintained continuation of PA 652 (Beach Lake Highway). Co-designated as County Route 24 (CR 24), NY 52 proceeds southeast through the hamlet of Narrowsburg in the town of Tusten as the two-lane Bridge Street. After crossing over Norfolk Southern's Southern Tier Line, NY 52 and CR 24 pass St. Francis Xavier Cemetery and then leave the center of Narrowsburg, merging with NY 97 south of Feagles Lake. County maintenance ends at this point.

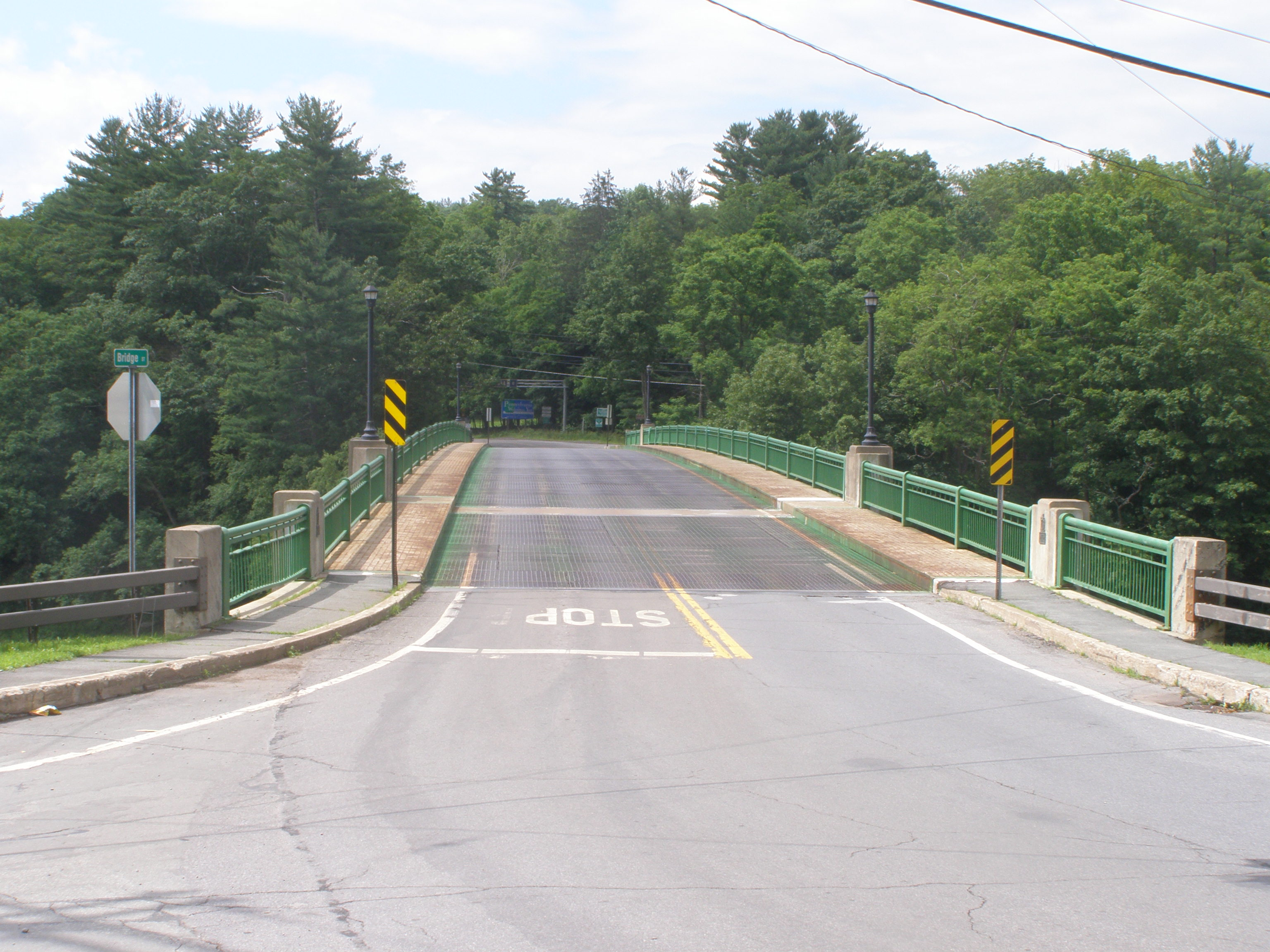
The Narrowsburg–Darbytown Bridge, the western terminus of NY 52

The two routes soon bend eastward to a junction where NY 52 turns northward on a county-maintained roadway. Now co-designated as CR 111, NY 52 bends northeast through Tusten, remaining a two-lane rural roadway as it climbs slightly out of the river valley. The surrounding landscape is mostly forested, with occasional farm clearings. A mile from that junction, NY 52 and CR 111 reach the small hamlet of Lava, crossing the northern terminus of CR 25 (Eckes Road). Continuing northeast out of Lava, the two routes continue past Beaver Pond and then descend into the Tenmile River valley. A short distance later, NY 52 crosses into the town of Cochecton, where CR 111 terminates and NY 52 becomes concurrent with CR 112.

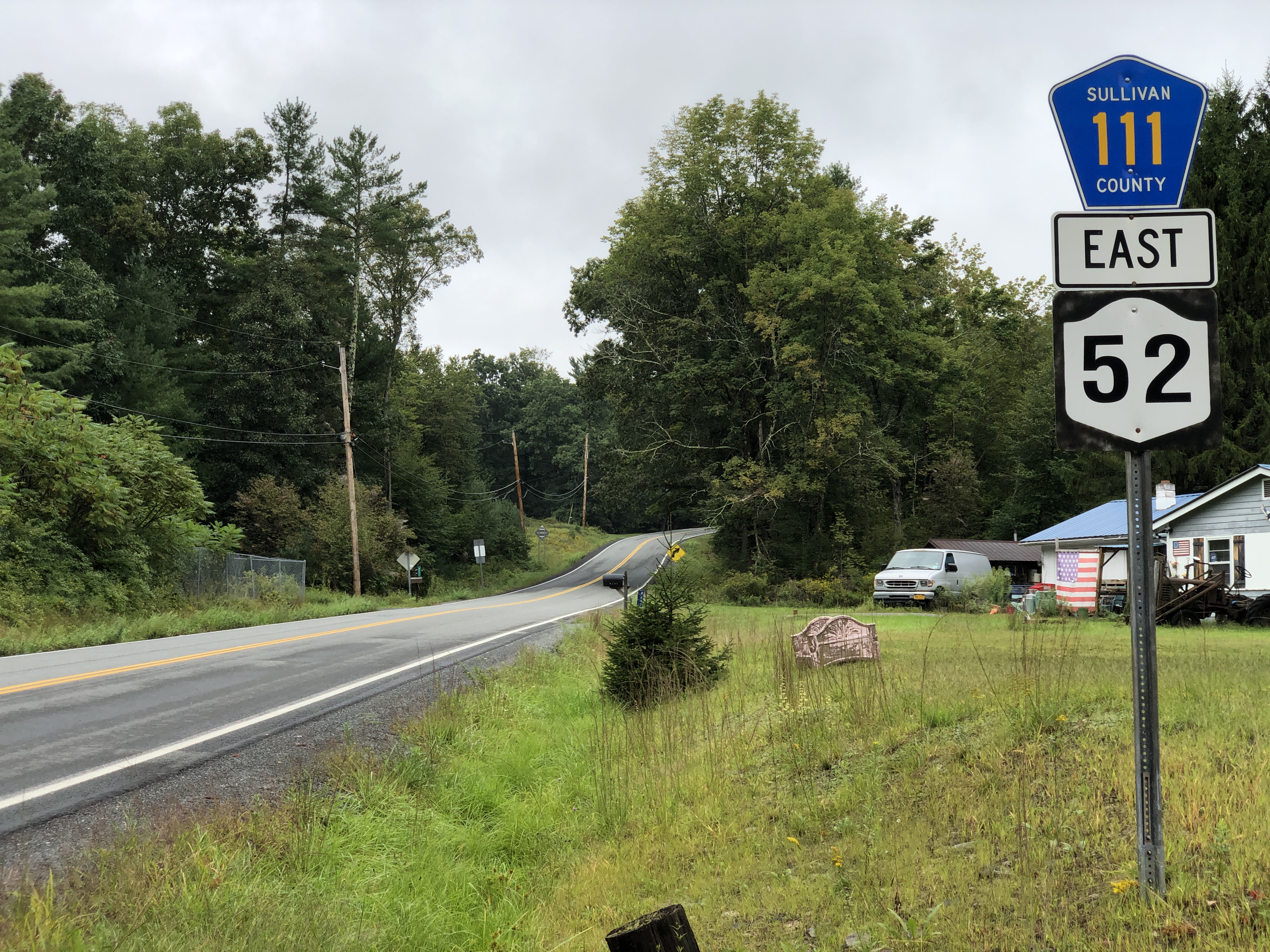
NY 52 and CR 111 eastbound at NY 97

NY 52 continues northeast through Cochecton, reaching the hamlet of Cochecton Center. After passing through, NY 52 and CR 112 turn straight northwest for 0.8 miles (1.3 km) through Cochecton at a junction with CR 115 (Browntown Road). At the second junction with Kelly Road, the route turns north for a half-mile (800 m), turning westward at Buff Road to reach the southern shore of Lake Huntington. The routes turn north along the western shore, entering the eponymous hamlet and reaching the eastern terminus of CR 116. At this junction, CR 112 ends, and NY 52 becomes maintained as CR 113.

CR 113 and NY 52 turn northeast briefly along the northern shore of the lake, then leaving it and continuing northeast through Cochecton. Farms begin to break up the forest cover around the road more extensively here. At the junction with Shortcut Road, NY 52 turns to the north, reaching a junction in a half-mile with NY 17B and the eastern terminus of CR 114 (Newburgh Turnpike). At this junction, the small hamlet of Fosterdale, NY 17B turns north and joins NY 52, which becomes state-maintained again. The routes continue northward for 2,000 feet (610 m), where they split. NY 17B turns northwest along CR 117; NY 52 bends northeast and soon northward as a state-maintained highway.

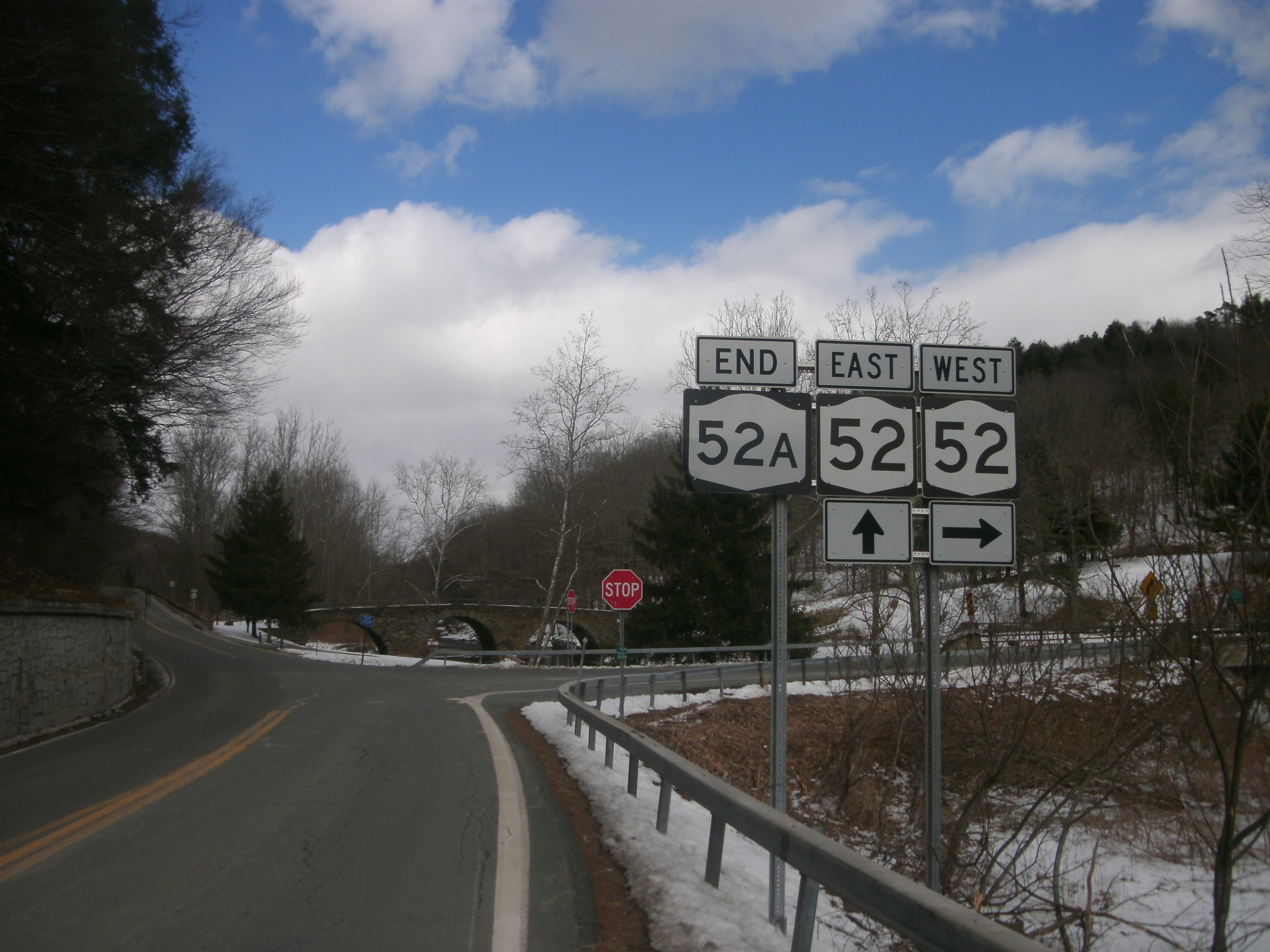
The NY 52A and NY 52 junction north of Kenoza Lake along NY 52A. NY 52 continues northeast in the distance

After crossing the Delaware town line, NY 52 bends east past a residential section around Pine Lake. At Mueller Road, NY 52 turns north and begins to run along the shore of Kenoza Lake. At the northern end of the lake, NY 52 reaches the hamlet of Kenoza Lake. The route turns northwest out of the small lakeside community, continuing north. Crossing the East Branch of Callicoon Creek, which it will follow to its source, NY 52 passes the southern end of Stone Arch Bridge Historic Park. After the bridge, NY 52 reaches the eastern terminus of NY 52A. NY 52 turns northeast along the creek, soon turning northward. The surrounding valley is now mostly cleared farmland. Two miles (3.2 km) from the NY 52A junction, NY 52 reaches the hamlet of Kohlertown.

==== Jeffersonville, Liberty, and Woodbourne ====
Just north of Kohlertown, NY 52 reaches a junction with the terminus of CR 164 (Beechwood Road). One block later, CR 128 (Jeffersonville North Branch Road) forks off to the northwest. At this junction, NY 52 turns northeast and crosses the town line into Callicoon. Here, this is also the boundary of Jeffersonville, the first village along the route.

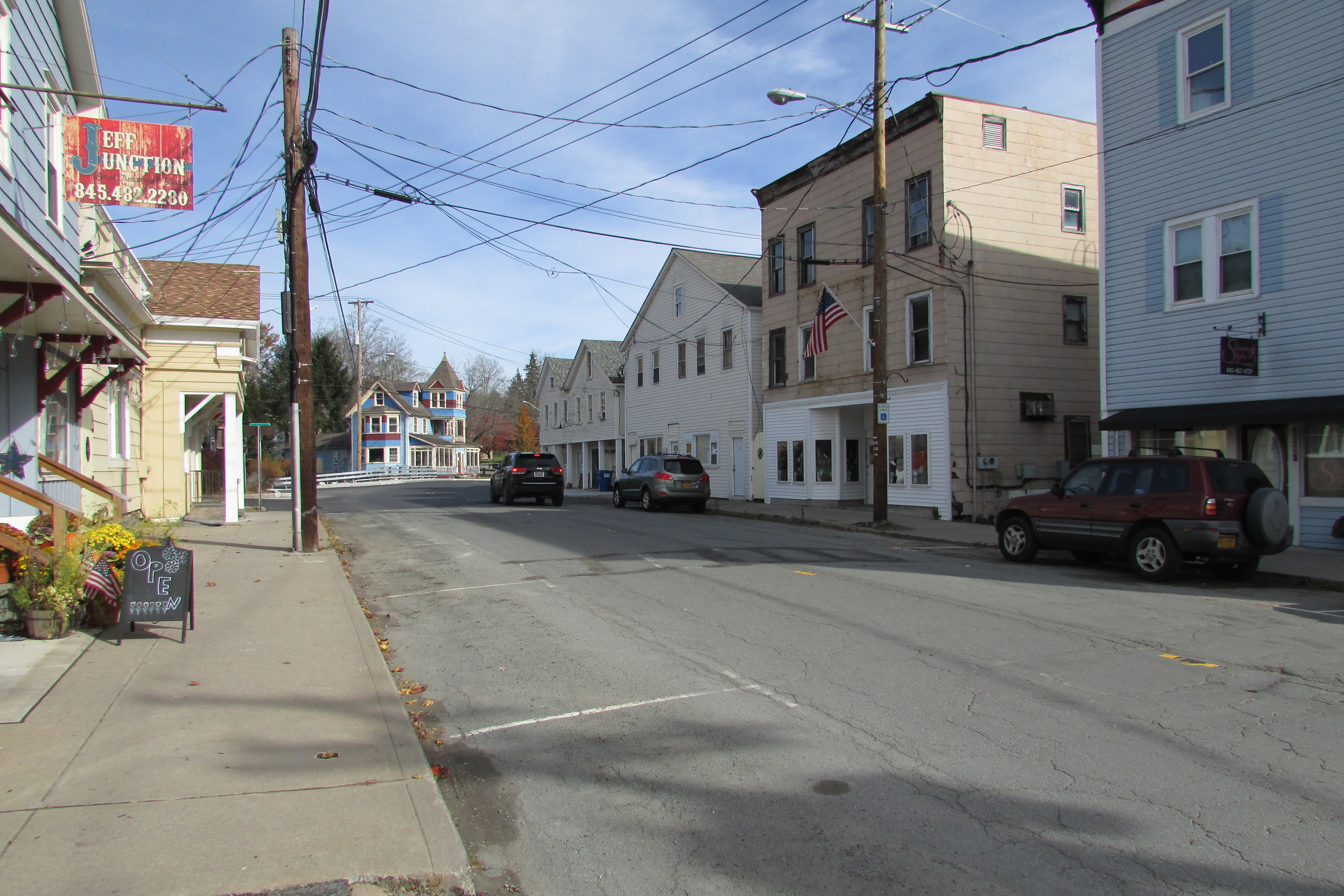
Downtown Jeffersonville

NY 52 enters downtown Jeffersonville on East Main Street, with parking along both sides. It turns east at a junction with Center Street then bends southeast out of the village, following the northern shore of Lake Jefferson. Beyond the lake, the route bends northeast past a junction with CR 144 (Briscoe Road) then continues along the headwaters of the East Branch.

At the junction with Hemmer Road, NY 52 bends northeast and soon eastward into the hamlet of Youngsville. There, it passes numerous residences, crosses over the creek and intersects the southern terminus of CR 149 (Shandelee Road). A half-mile west, the route crosses into the town of Liberty, slowly gaining elevation as the East Branch's valley narrows. Turning slightly southeast, NY 52 enters the hamlet of White Sulphur Springs, which it soon leaves after passing a local park.

NY 52 continues winding southeast through a landscape with less farms and more forest, the surrounding hills growing increasingly higher and steeper. After passing south of the hamlet of Loomis, the route bends northeast again reaches the village of Liberty, the largest community thus far along NY 52. (Note: Liberty's population at the 2010 census was 4,392, more than ten times that of Jeffersonville) It turns due-east and follows Chestnut Street into the village. As the route becomes more commercial, NY 52 turns southeast at the intersection with North Main Street in the center of Liberty. Two village blocks later, NY 55 (Lake Street) joins it at the historic Munson Diner. The overlap goes to a roundabout 700 feet (210 m) to the east, where the two routes fork. NY 52 continues southeast along Mill Street, passing through an industrial section of Liberty before reaching a second roundabout. At this junction, the route connects with an off-ramp from the eastbound NY 17 expressway, now also Interstate 86.

Paralleling NY 17, NY 52 continues south a short distance through an undeveloped area outside the village, then turns southeast to its actual exit with the freeway. At a junction with CR 175 (Old Route 17). NY 52 passes through a commercial strip mall section of Liberty, south of the Grossinger Country Club. Now on the Catskill Plateau, at elevations over 1,000 feet (300 m) above sea level, the route becomes rural again. Two and a half miles from Route 17 it bends northeast into the town of Fallsburg near a junction with CR 51 (Hilldale Road). Turning southeast again, NY 52 soon reaches a junction with CR 105 (Divine Corners Road). Turning southeast further, the route passes the northern entrance road Sullivan County Community College, the highest elevation on its entire length at 1,531 feet (467 m), and then descends to the hamlet of Loch Sheldrake.

Crossing through the center of the hamlet, the route passes just south of the actual Loch Sheldrake, then reaches an intersection with CR 104 (Loch Sheldrake Hurleyville Road), the center of the small community. At the eastern end of the hamlet, the route passes north of Evens Lake. NY 52 turns east again, through increasingly wooded countryside, soon changing over to a commercial-residential road and running southeast for a short distance. The route soon bends northeast as it descends toward the hamlet of Woodbourne, where NY 42 joins Route 52 from the south.

The two routes curve past residences to Woodbourne's small downtown, then cross the Neversink River. Immediately east of that bridge, NY 42 turns north toward Grahamsville, ending the brief concurrency. NY 52 turns southeast past Woodbourne Correctional Facility to the south, over the south side of a small unnamed hill and then into Ulster County approximately one mile to the east.

=== Ulster County ===
Now in the town of Wawarsing, NY 52 bends southeast into an area that remains heavily forested along the next 10 miles (16 km) as it gradually descends off the Catskill Plateau to Ellenville. The route follows a straight course to the southeast past the small residential hamlet of Dairyland, passing a junction with CR 53A (Milk Road). Four miles (6.4 km) further east, it passes another similar small hamlet, Greenfield Park, and bends back to the east a mile after passing the north end of Windsor Lake.

NY 52 leaves Dairyland, crossing southeast through Wawarsing into the residential hamlet of Greenfield Park and past Windsor Lake, the source of the West Branch of the Beer Kill, which it follows to Ellenville. East of the lake, the route bends northeastward for two more miles, crossing through some dense woods between steep hillsides and paralleling Old Greenfield Road. Both roads soon bend northward, as the woods recede to more residences. As the West Branch drains into the main Beer Kill, just outside Ellenville, NY 52 reaches a junction with CR 53 (Briggs Street).

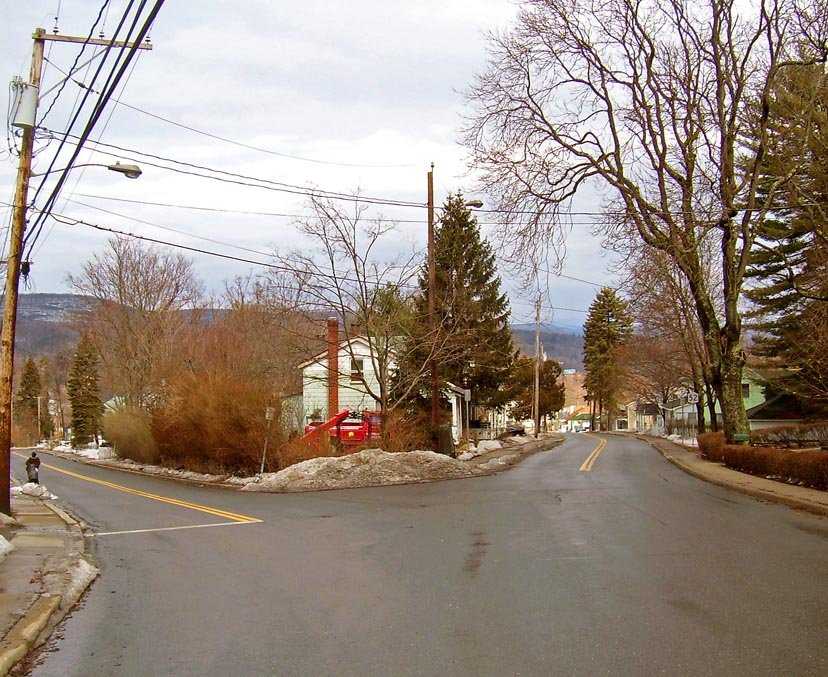
The eastern end of NY 52's split through Ellenville

After re-paralleling, NY 52 continues southeast, reaching the terminus of CR 53 (Old Greenfield Road). Entering Ellenville, the largest village on the route since Liberty, NY 52 divides. NY 52 runs down both Center Street and Canal Street. A few blocks into the village, NY 52 has its only intersection in Ulster County with a numbered route above the county level, US 209 (Main Street). The Shawangunk Ridge looms ahead. The route, on both Canal and Center, then crosses the village's downtown, 1,200 feet (370 m) lower than its peak at SCCC. In the residential section that follows the Sandburg Creek crossing, one of the cross streets, Towpath Lane, marks the former route of the Delaware and Hudson Canal, a National Historic Landmark. NY 52 bends southward, where Canal and Center Streets merge, taking the latter's name. At the village line, it becomes Mountain Avenue.

Over the next three miles (4.8 km), NY 52 climbs over a thousand feet (300 m) to the crest of the Shawangunk Ridge. This section offers several overlooks on the west side with views of the Catskills to the north and northwest and the valley below. The route itself passes rock outcrops, some with fencing to prevent the road from being blocked off, and steep wooded slopes. Near the base of the climb aqua paint blazes on signposts at the roadside indicate the brief presence of the Long Path hiking trail.

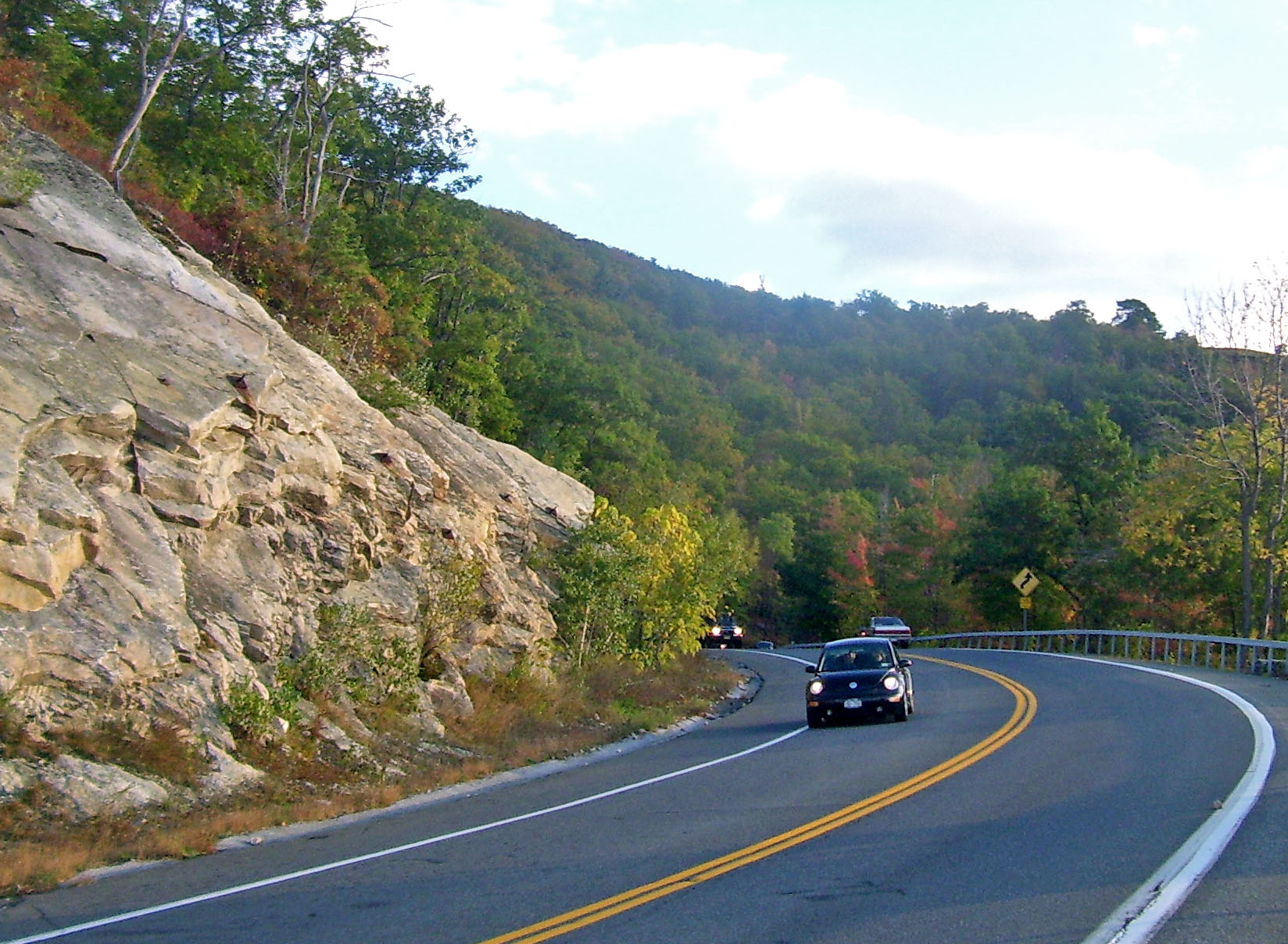
NY 52 climbing the Shawangunks

Near the top of the ridge, signs point north on CR 104 (Cragsmoor Road) to the hamlet of Cragsmoor, as NY 52 reaches the apex of the ridge, at 1,480 feet (450 m) in elevation having regained almost all the altitude lost on the way to Ellenville. As it begins to descend through dense woods of scrub oak, NY 52 enters the town of Shawangunk, very near the Sullivan County line. Shortly afterward, a clearing at a house below one bend in the steep road offers a panoramic view east, towards the Hudson River with the Hudson Highlands also visible. The route winds southeast and levels out at the hamlet of Walker Valley, having descended 910 feet (280 m) from the heights of the ridge.

Just southeast of Walker Valley, NY 52 crosses a junction with CR 65 (Weed Road). The brief breaks in the forest cover from the hamlet end. A mile beyond, NY 52 turns east, then bends northeast. At Verkeerderkill Park, CR 7 (Burlingham Road), merges in from the southeast. Here more cleared farmland begins to break up the forest. At the junction with New Prospect and Pirog roads, CR 7 turns off northeast, following the former. NY 52 turns southeast and, three-quarters of a mile (1.21 km) later, crosses the Orange County line at Shawangunk Kill.

=== Orange County ===
Across the bridge is the large hamlet of Pine Bush, part of the town of Crawford. NY 52's first intersection is the northern terminus of NY 302 (Maple Avenue). Known as Main Street, NY 52 crosses southeast through downtown Pine Bush for its next half-mile (800 m). The countryside beyond is primarily farms with some woodlots, the gently rolling terrain offering views north to the upper Shawangunks.

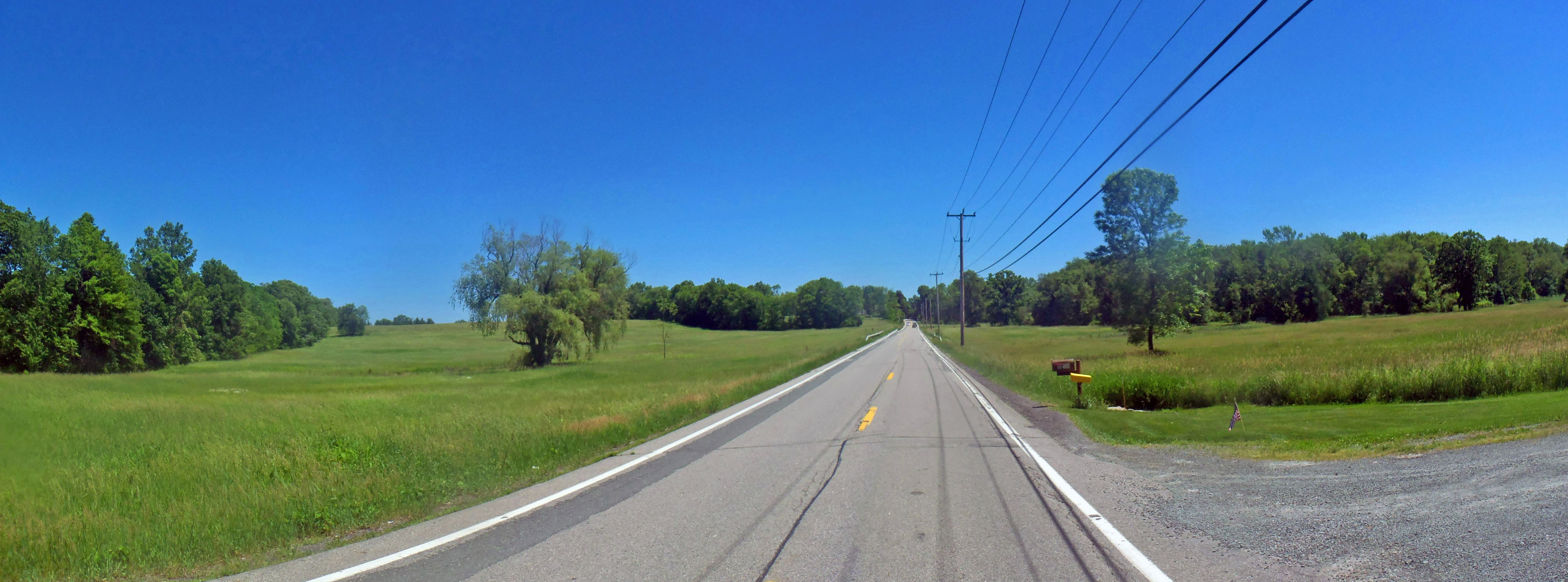
Route 52 approaching Walden

Three-quarters of a mile past Pine Bush, CR 89 (Hill Avenue) forks off to the southeast. Afterwards a slight descent heralds the Dwaar Kill crossing, the route remains a two-lane rural roadway through northern Orange County. A rise through a more wooded area culminates in the Montgomery town line at CR 17 (Fleury Road), where the landscape opens up again.

Continuing straight southeast past farms and some newer subdivisions, the route reaches CR 14 (Albany Post Road). At Rider Road, a half-mile further on, NY 52 curves further to the southeast, taking it across a wide swath of farmland into the village of Walden, the largest settlement along the route. (Note: Walden's 2010 population was just under 7,000.) It follows first residential North Montgomery Street, which becomes South Montgomery Street at the Oak Street intersection, marked by a few small businesses.

At the junction with Walker Street, NY 52 turns sharply eastward, becoming West Main Street while South Montgomery Street continues towards the village of Montgomery via CR 29. Immediately following this turn, NY 52 crosses the Walden Veterans' Memorial Bridge over the Wallkill River, entering the center of Walden. Conspicuous here is the brick tower of Walden United Methodist Church. After several blocks, West Main reaches an intersection with local Bank Street on the north, NY 208 (Ulster Avenue) ahead, and Main Street to the southeast. It joins NY 208 on Main.

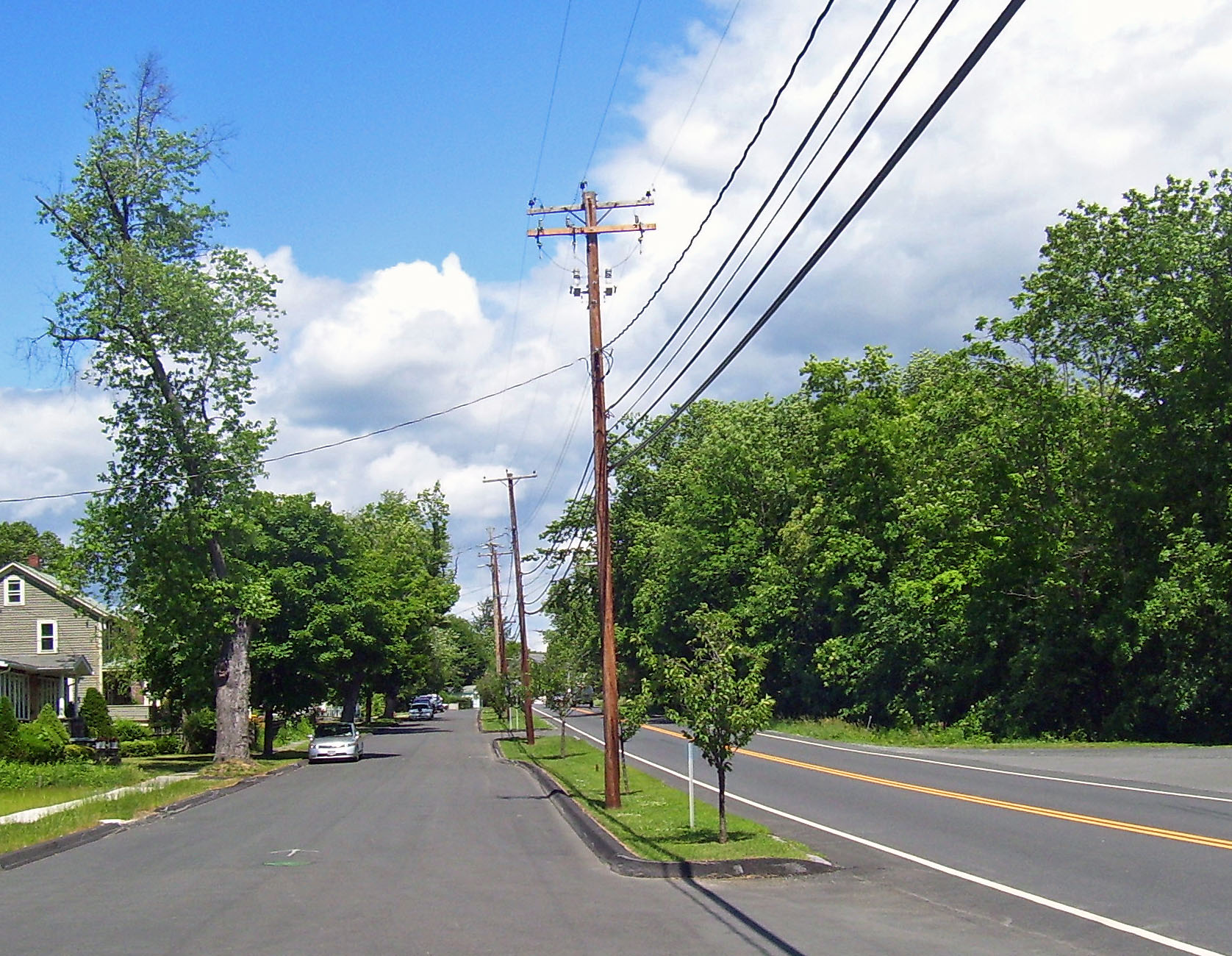
Parallel roadways in eastern Walden along NY 52

The two routes fork a short two blocks later at Orange Avenue, which NY 208 follows toward Maybrook while NY 52 continues east as East Main Street. A quarter-mile (400 m) beyond, at the first of the route's several crossings of Wallkill tributary Tin Brook, the houses on the north side of the road start to have a deep setback, reflecting a past division of NY 52 at this point. The second roadway remains in use from Woodruff Avenue to the village's eastern boundary.

Past Walden, NY 52 passes several businesses, then Wallkill Valley Cemetery on the south. A mile west of there, just past another crossing of Tin Brook, CR 85 (St. Andrew's Road), leaves from the north. Past East Walden, the route becomes a two-lane rural road, bending southeast at a junction with Old South Plank Road. The landscape remains the same gently rolling countryside of worked fields it was between Walden and Pine Bush.

The last two crossings of Tin Brook, a mile and a half (2.4 km) east of CR 85 precede a bend to the southeast. The woods on the side of the road increase here as NY 52 climbs slightly after the Catskill Aqueduct crosses a half-mile from that turn. In another half-mile, the route returns to its more easterly course as it enters the town of Newburgh and takes the name South Plank Road at the intersection with Old South Plank Road and Cooks Lane.

After passing a swampy area in the woods to the north, NY 52 intersects CR 23 (Rock Cut Road), then runs through swamps along the southern shore of Orange Lake on an eastward heading. Immediately afterwards, a single intersection marks the very small commercial center of the hamlet of Orange Lake. Just past the hamlet, NY 52 turns southeast again at a junction with Monarch Drive and enters an area where woods screen residential neighborhoods off the route. It is paralleled on the north by Bushfield Creek, which drains Orange Lake. With both the creek and route going past a large hill on the south, NY 52 bends southeast again to cross under the New York State Thruway (I-87).

A commercial strip begins shortly after the Thruway, continuing a half-mile past it to the junction with NY 300 (Union Avenue) at the center of the hamlet of Gardnertown. The strip continues another half-mile to the Powder Mill Road where the route runs along the southern side of Algonquin Powder Mill Park, where it becomes residential again. In the wetlands north of the route past the park, as the route bends around another hill to the south, Bushfield Creek flows into Quassaick Creek, which itself flows under NY 52 just above the now-drained Winona Lake south of the road. Here the route turns more to the south.

Just after the junction with Fifth Avenue, a thousand feet past the lake, the route crosses over Interstate 84 at that route's exit 37. Just after the overpass, NY 52 turns eastward down the onramp and merges with the interstate. The four-lane expressway is the only section of NY 52 not to be a two-lane surface road, and is its last and longest concurrency. The two routes follow the northern border of the city of Newburgh northeast and then east. At Exit 39, a mile and a half (2.4 km) from the merger, US 9W (Albany Post Road north of the exit, North Robinson Avenue south of it) and NY 32 intersect just south of the end of their overlap. NY 32 follows North Plank Road as it turns inland towards New Paltz, while US 9W continues to parallel the river north to Marlboro and Highland.

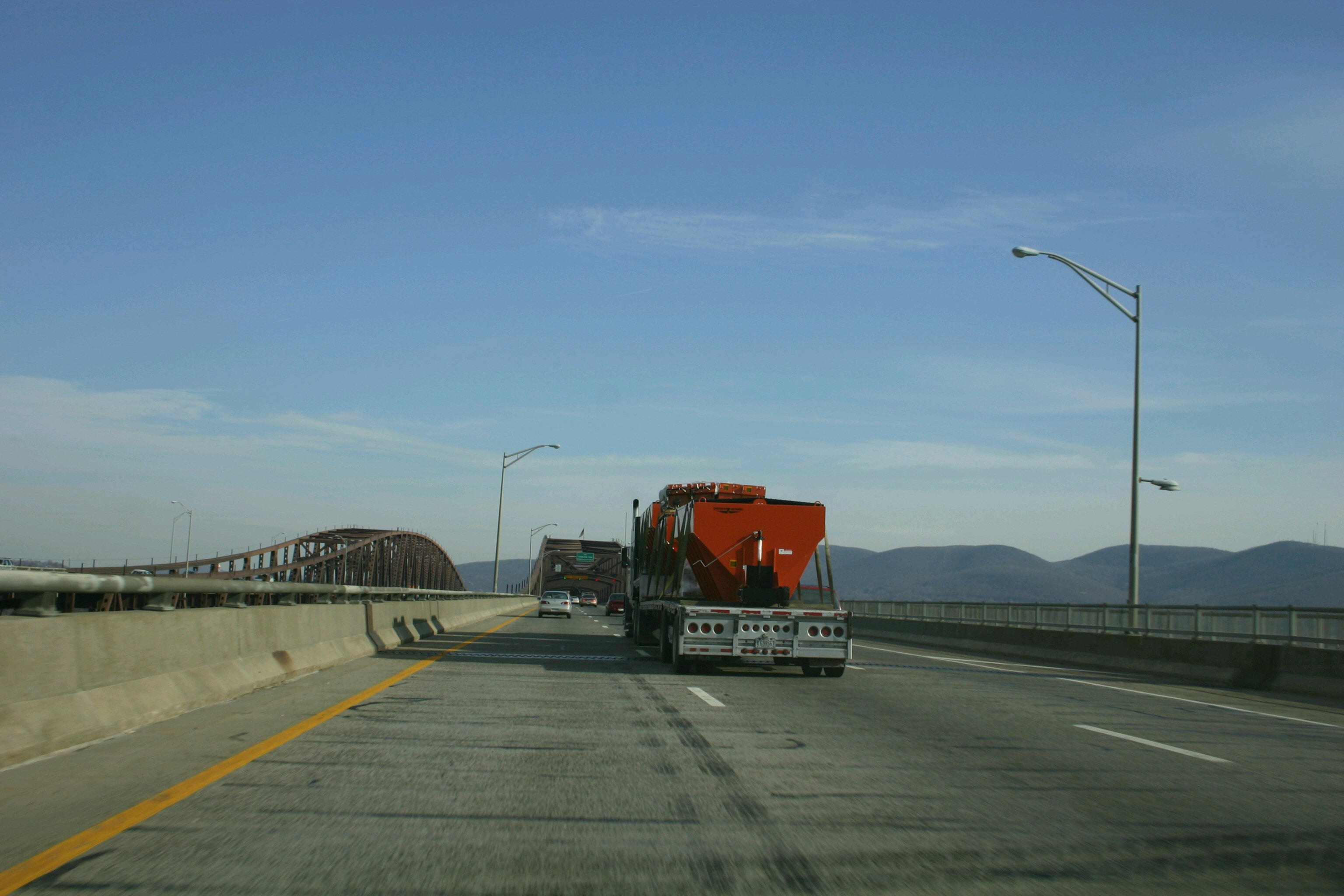
Crossing the Newburgh-Beacon Bridge eastbound

After exit 39, NY 52 and I-84 continue east between the city of Newburgh on the south and the town's affluent residential hamlet of Balmville to the north. The expressway widens to six lanes as it reaches the twin spans of the 1.5-mile (2.4 km) Hamilton Fish Newburgh-Beacon Bridge. Just before crossing over the Hudson River, the routes cross over the CSX West Shore Railroad.

In the middle of the wide crossing of the river's Newburgh Bay, the routes enter Dutchess County. To the south the cities of Beacon and Newburgh frame a view of the northern Hudson Highlands, including Beacon Mountain, Breakneck Ridge and Storm King. To the north marinas at Chelsea and New Hamburg are visible on the river's east side, with the Roseton and Danskammer power plants standing out on the west.

=== Dutchess County ===
On the east side of the Hudson, NY 52 and I-84 cross over Metro-North Railroad's Hudson Line just north of the Beacon station, visible from the bridge. They pass briefly through the northern corner of the city of Beacon, where the bridge's tolls ($1.50 for cars paying cash, $1.25 for EZPass users, and more for trucks) is collected from eastbound traffic. Immediately afterwards is the town of Fishkill and Exit 41. NY 9D crosses, taking traffic north towards Wappingers Falls and south into Beacon. NY 52 Business begins here along the latter direction.

After the exit, the routes narrow to four lanes again and bend northeast, passing Dutchess Stadium on the north. Prominent on a hilltop south of the road is Fishkill Correctional Facility. As the expressway bends eastward again, high chain-link fences with concertina wire surround the concrete buildings of another prison, Downstate Correctional Facility, on the north. Signs warn drivers not to stop due to the proximity of both facilities.

A mile and a half (2.4 km) further east, after passing through a rock cut and going over undulating terrain in a woody area, the routes turn southeast into Exit 44. Here NY 52 Business completes its loop from the south, and NY 52 leaves the interstate after 8 miles (13 km). It closely parallels I-84 for the remainder of its route.

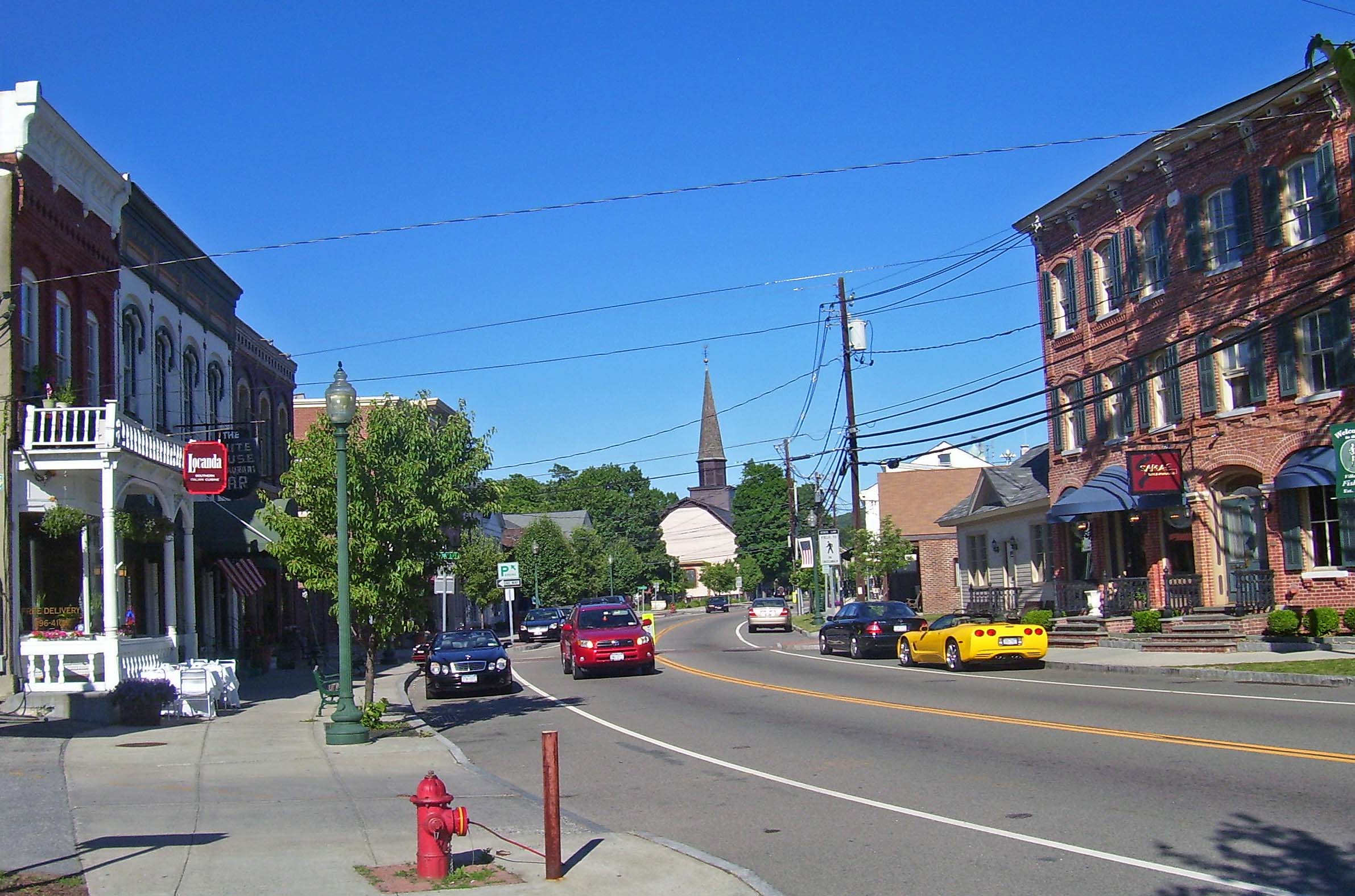
Historic downtown Fishkill along NY 52

NY 52 passes through a residential area as a two-lane surface road as it heads northeast from I-84. A quarter-mile (400 m) from the interchange, it enters the village of Fishkill, the last along its route. As Main Street, it soon becomes heavily developed, with businesses on both sides. Jackson Street, which soon becomes CR 34, leaves to the north midway through the village. Downtown culminates in the intersection with US 9, a divided four-lane commercial strip at this point.

On the other side of US 9, NY 52 becomes Hopewell Avenue. It passes through some residential and less intensely commercial areas before leaving the village after a quarter-mile, still following a northeast heading. The next mile closely parallels both Fishkill Creek and Metro-North's infrequently used Beacon Line. At the small hamlet of Brinckerhoff, the route bends southeast to cross them both as NY 82 continues northeast towards Hopewell Junction.

Three-quarters of a mile (1.1 km) later, after bending around Honess Mountain, NY 52 crosses the East Fishkill town line at the hamlet of Wiccopee. It curves northeast again and soon passes the large IBM manufacturing facilities and the Hudson Valley Research Park on the south. CR 31 (Palen Road) leaves from the north in the middle of this mile-long stretch.

Just after the park, CR 27 (Lime Kiln Road), a divided four-lane surface road, leaves to the south, connecting to I-84 at Exit 50. NY 52 turns more to the northeast for a half-mile, then bends slightly southeast past a swampy area that precedes the center of East Fishkill. Just before the small Gayhead Pond north of the route, NY 376 leaves, ultimately turning west towards Poughkeepsie. From that intersection the route continues east, then turns northeast after a half-mile. After another half-mile, NY 52 crosses under the Taconic State Parkway, its last junction with a limited-access route. Both entrance ramps to the parkway are on the south side of the route.

A quarter-mile (400 m) from the parkway, CR 29 (Carpenter Road) forks off to the north. Over the mile (1.6 km) after the interchange, the route slowly curves back eastward through an area of residential side streets. Then NY 216 forks off to the northeast, leading to Green Haven Correctional Facility and the hamlet of Stormville.

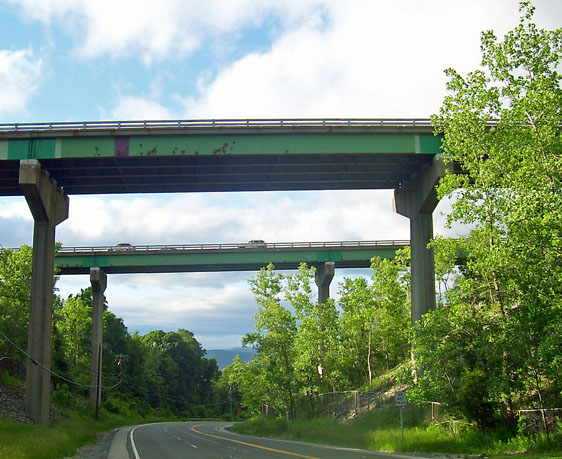
I-84 overpasses vaulting above NY 52 in the town of East Fishkill

For the next half-mile (800 m) NY 52 passes through a more wooded area, then turns southeastward again. After another half-mile, the route turns due south and begins to climb steeply into the wooded foothills of the Taconic Mountains through a narrow creek valley. I-84 crosses overhead, on a very high overpass. A half-mile further on from that, the Appalachian Trail (AT) crosses the route.

The route turns again a quarter-mile (400 m) from the AT to follow a more easterly course. The terrain levels out into a minimally developed area of small bumps and wetlands. After another three-quarters of a mile, NY 52 reaches its highest elevation east of the Hudson, 962 feet (293 m) above sea level, at the Mountain Top Road intersection.

NY 52 turns southeast again and reaches the hamlet of Pecksville after a mile (1.6 km). There it has a staggered junction with CR 30 (Milltown Road on the south, then Holmes Road on the north). The route draws closer to I-84 and turns southeast. Three-quarters of a mile (1.1 km) from Pecksville, with Mill Pond between it and the interstate, NY 52 crosses the Putnam County line.

=== Putnam County ===
Immediately after crossing the county line, NY 52 enters the hamlet of Ludingtonville, part of the town of Kent. It consists of a few houses and some businesses, primarily gas stations that serve traffic from I-84's adjacent exit 58 for CR 40 (Ludingtonville Road). At that junction, the route is headed due south. It turns southwest briefly, then southeast again.

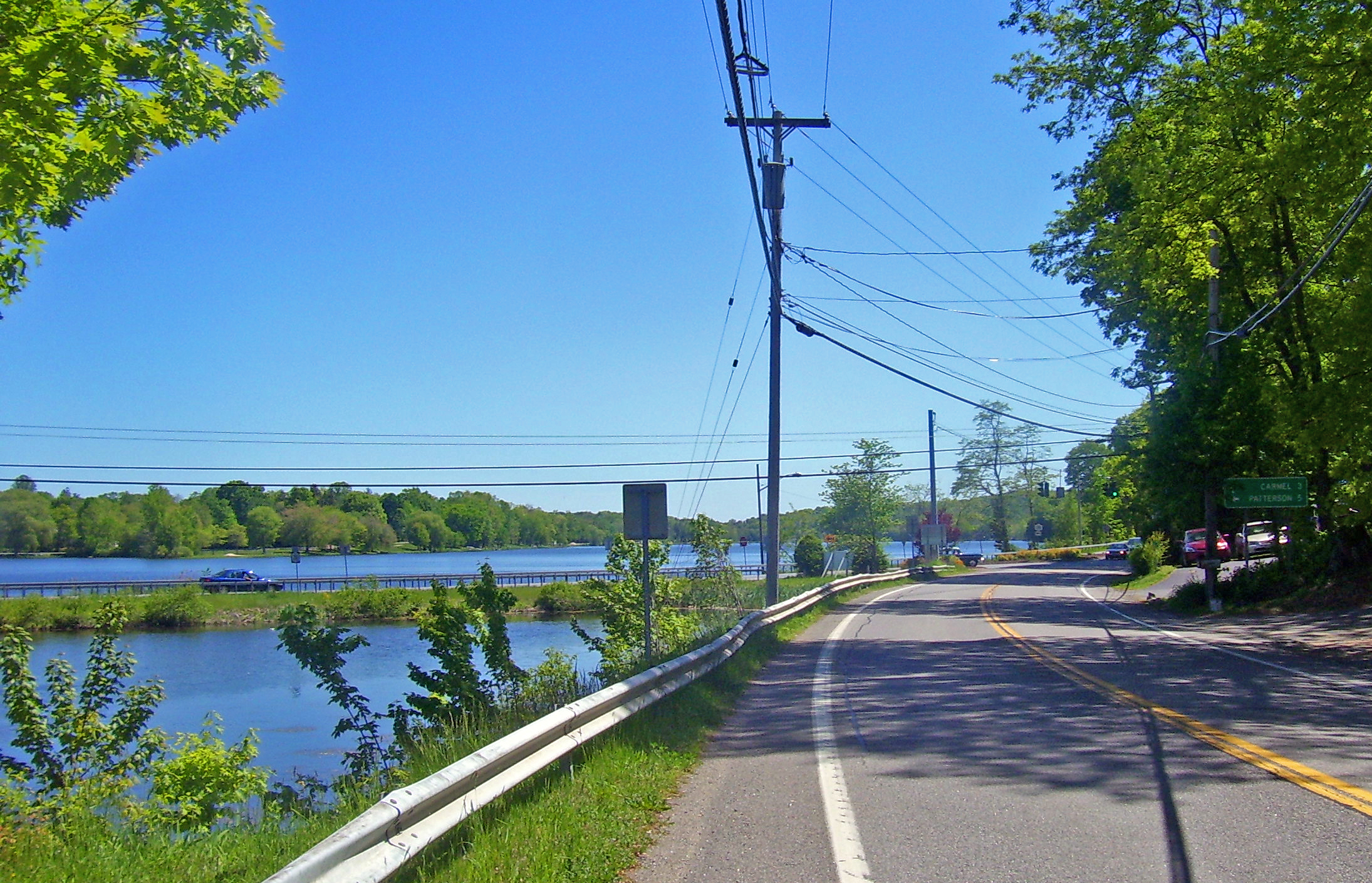
NY 52 at the NY 311 junction at Lake Carmel

The next 2.5 miles (4.0 km) run almost straight through wooded, hilly country, getting further east of the interstate. Eventually NY 52 reaches the west shore of a small northern bay of Lake Carmel, center of the residential community of that name. Shortly afterward NY 311 branches off to the east on a short causeway across the lake. It is a mile (1.6 km) back to I-84's exit 61 via NY 311, the last connection between the interstate and NY 52 although their routes still run parallel.

NY 52 continues along the western shore of the lake for another mile. Just past its south end, it intersects with CR 45 (Towners Road). After turning southwest the route intersects CR 48 (Horse Pound Road). A thousand feet (300 m) south of that junction, NY 52 reaches the town of Carmel.

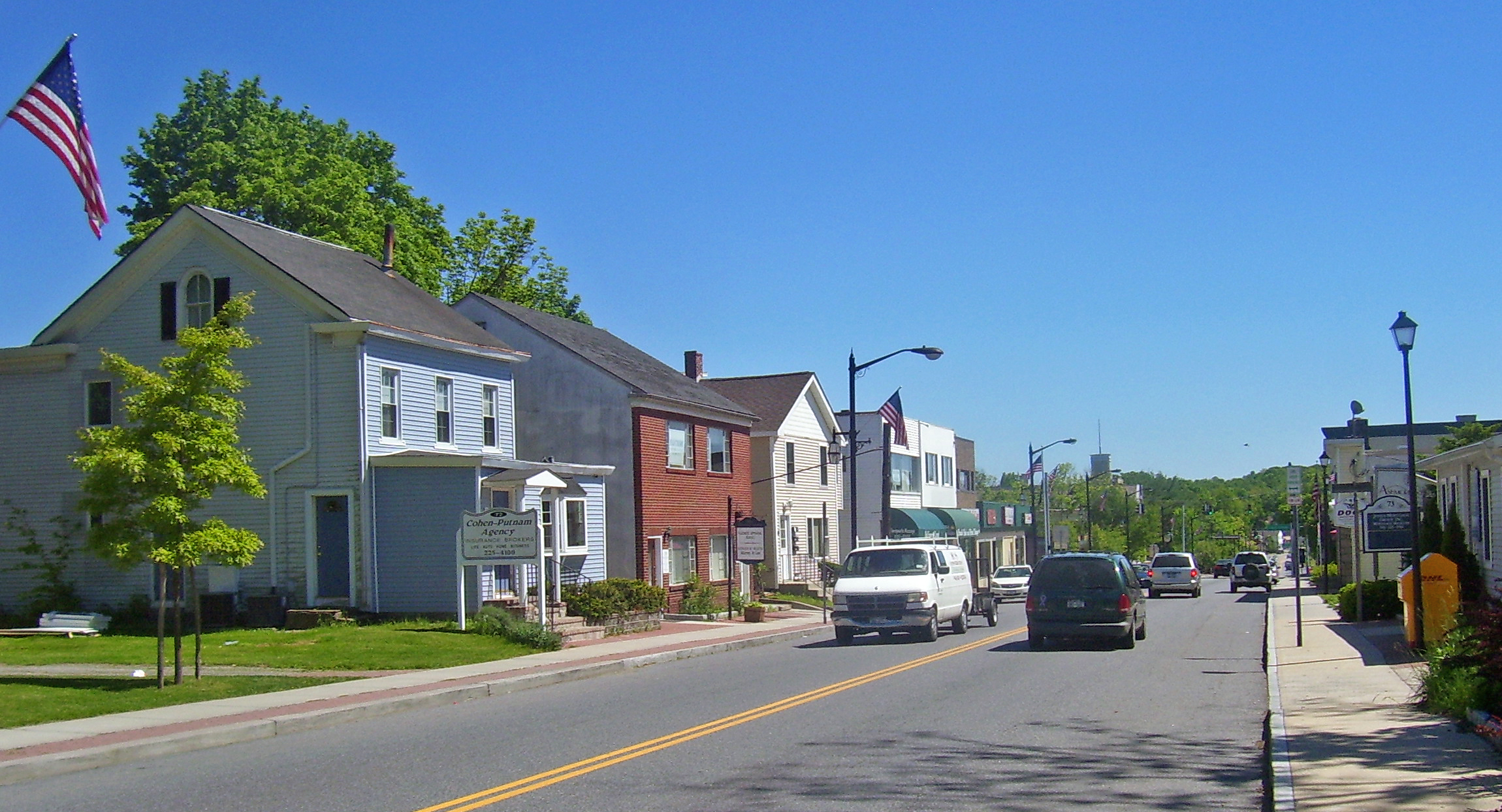
Looking east on Rt. 52 in Carmel Hamlet just before it ends

The route bends southward again, passing Raymond Hill Cemetery, then a large strip mall on the westbound direction. NY 52 follows Gleneida Avenue, the main street of the hamlet of Carmel, the county seat, with businesses on both sides. A mile from the town line, just across from the old county courthouse, NY 301 ends its journey from Cold Spring. Just past the junction is Lake Gleneida, part of the New York City water supply system, the center of a park on that side of the route. A quarter-mile further on, at Reed Memorial Library, NY 52 ends at a three-way junction with US 6.

== History ==
Similar to many state highways in the region, NY 52 follows a number of roads originally built as private turnpikes during the early 19th century. While the turnpikes made significant improvements to very poor roads, they were not popular with the public and eventually failed, leaving their roads for the county or state to maintain.

=== Predecessor turnpikes ===
One of these, the Woodbourne and Ellenville Turnpike Company, connected those two communities. After being incorporated by the New York Legislature in 1830, it built and opened a turnpike from Ellenville on the Delaware and Hudson Canal west to Woodbourne in 1838, and later extended it further in that direction to Liberty.

To the east of Ellenville, the Newburgh and Ellenville Plank Road Company was proposed in late 1849 to build and charge tolls on a plank road between Ellenville and Newburgh, major markets on the canal and Hudson respectively, and incorporated the following year. The company decided shortly thereafter to build on a southern route; the supporters of a northern route organized the Newburgh and Shawangunk Plank Road two weeks later. Both roads were completed in December 1851; an opening celebration for the Newburgh and Ellenville was held at Ellenville that month.

The south route is now, with some modifications, part of NY 52. In 1895 the Walden and Orange Lake Railroad, later part of the Orange County Traction Company, built a trolley line along the old turnpike between Orange Lake, then the end of a suburban line from Newburgh, and Walden. It carried passengers and freight, including milk, until its demise in 1925.

Other former turnpikes used by NY 52 include short lengths of the Jeffersonville and Monticello Turnpike (Jeffersonville to Briscoe Road), Ulster and Orange Branch Turnpike (Liberty to Cross Farm Road), Philipstown Turnpike (Pecksville to Ludingtonville), and Putnam and Dutchess Turnpike (Ludingtonville to the end in Carmel). By the 1890s, the entire route that would become NY 52 existed as public or turnpike roads.

=== Public ownership ===
After the demise of the turnpikes, the State Commission of Highways was created by the legislature in 1898 to improve and maintain state highways. In 1909, a connected network of routes was laid out by the legislature; none of the present NY 52 was included. It was also not part of the system of signed state routes numbered in 1924. By 1926, Route 39 was signed from Poughkeepsie to Patterson, using a short piece of modern NY 52 between East Fishkill and Stormville.

=== Formal designation ===
NY 52 was designated as part of the 1930 renumbering of state highways in New York. West of East Fishkill, NY 52 was assigned to its current routing along a previously unnumbered road through downstate New York to the Pennsylvania state line; however, it was several years before NY 52 as a whole was improved and paved. At its west end, NY 52 connected with US 106, which had been designated in 1926 and ended at the Delaware River on the Pennsylvania state line. US 106 was never extended into New York, and is now PA 652 near the border.

To the east of East Fishkill, the newly designated NY 52 used the old alignment of 1920s Route 39 from East Fishkill to West Patterson, where 52 continued along previously unnumbered roads south to Carmel, then east to NY 22 at Sears Corners (northeast of Brewster) over modern NY 311, US 6, and NY 312, as well as its modern alignment from Lake Carmel to Carmel. At the time, modern NY 52 from Stormville to Ludingtonville (northwest of Lake Carmel) was designated as part of NY 216. NY 52 and NY 216 mostly swapped alignments in the area c. 1937; NY 52 was rerouted onto its modern alignment between Stormville and Lake Carmel, utilizing the portion of NY 216 from Stormville and Ludingtonville as well as a new roadway between Ludingtonville and Lake Carmel while NY 216 was relocated to the old Route 39 alignment (Stormville–Poughquag–West Patterson). The original NY 52 segment from West Patterson to Lake Carmel was assigned as an extension of NY 311. NY 52 was also truncated to its present terminus in Carmel at this time.

=== Realignments and detours ===
The only major change to NY 52's routing since then came with the opening of the Newburgh–Beacon Bridge in 1963. Prior to then, NY 52 had crossed the Hudson River on the Newburgh–Beacon Ferry, approaching from the west on Dupont Avenue and Broadway (overlapping NY 17K on Broadway) and from the east on Fishkill Avenue and Wolcott Avenue (now mostly NY 52 Business).

Natural disasters and construction have forced temporary closures and re-routings in some areas. At the end of 2002, a rockslide along the stretch climbing the Shawangunks east of Ellenville buried an 85-foot (25 m) section of the road with an estimated 1,000 cubic yards (800 m^{3}) of rock and dirt. The state Department of Transportation closed the road temporarily. Automobile traffic was detoured via several local roads; trucks had to make a lengthy side trip via Route 17 During the 2003–2005 construction of the new bridge over the Wallkill River in Walden, NY 52 was routed to Walden's other bridge (the "Low Bridge") via Oak Street, which intersects the highway twice within the village. This required the erection of two temporary traffic signals, causing some new traffic problems in the village. Truck traffic was detoured to NY 17K via Albany Post Road and Stone Castle Road.

== Future ==
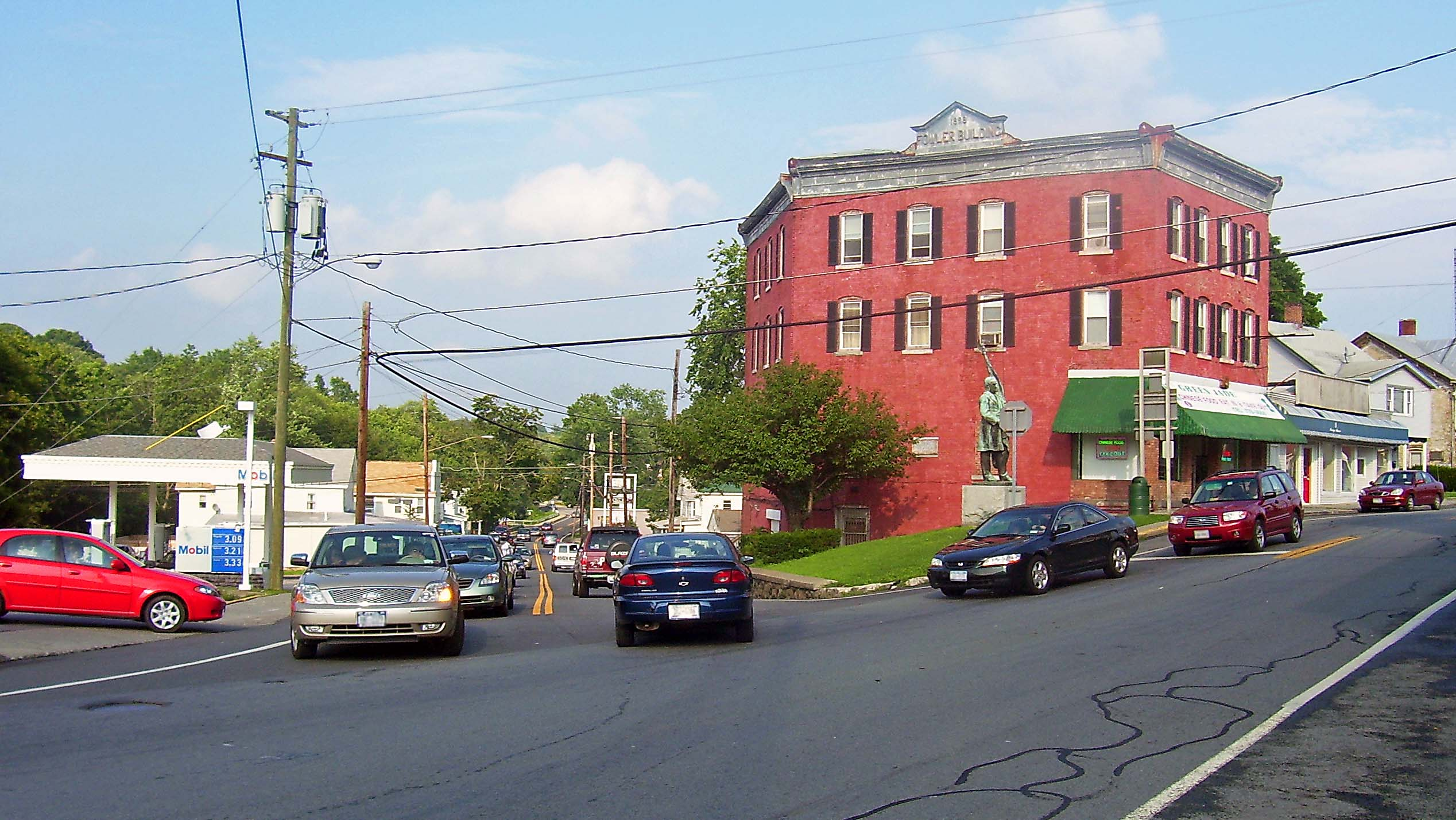
The congested eastern end of the NY 208 overlap in Walden.

The village of Walden has noted, in its 2019 Comprehensive Plan, the difficulties created by the oblique intersection at the eastern end of the Route 208 concurrency. Traffic on northbound 208 comes to a stop sign at the intersection, where 52 comes in from the right at a slightly lower grade and a sharp angle, with the view mostly blocked by a building.

It is also just opposite one of two curb cuts for a busy gas station. At rush hour, the traffic light at the nearby northern end often backs cars up along 52 for some distance, making the turn into the gas station difficult, especially when vehicles on 52 make the left turn into the curb cut. Some are often stranded in the middle of the intersection when turning between the two highways. A 2009 traffic study found the intersection at level of service D, during peak hours with the potential to reach "F" within five years.

The layout of the intersection is very poor for trucks making this turn; they have caused damage to the curb. The congestion that all these factors create has been forcing more drivers to resort to the use of side streets, the village believes, since traffic counts have been going up on 52 and 208 but down on the concurrency. It has prohibited all trucks over 5 short tons (4.5 t) from any road in the village except the two state highways and certain side streets, and continues to monitor the situation with the hope of eventually signalizing the junction.

== Major intersections ==
County	Location	mi	km	Exit	Destinations	Notes
Delaware River		0.00	0.00		PA 652 west – Honesdale	Continuation into Pennsylvania
Delaware River		0.00	0.00		Narrowsburg–Darbytown Bridge	
Sullivan	Tusten	0.69	1.11		NY 97 north – Callicoon	Western end of NY 97 concurrency; hamlet of Narrowsburg
Sullivan	Tusten	1.45	2.33		NY 97 south – Port Jervis	Eastern end of NY 97 concurrency; hamlet of Hunts Corner
Sullivan	Cochecton	11.09	17.85		NY 17B east / CR 114 west – Monticello	Western end of NY 17B concurrency; eastern terminus of CR 114; hamlet of Fosterdale
Sullivan	Cochecton	11.55	18.59		NY 17B west / CR 117 west – Callicoon	Eastern end of NY 17B concurrency; eastern terminus of CR 117
Sullivan	Delaware	14.85	23.90		NY 52A west – Callicoon	Eastern terminus of NY 52A
Sullivan	Village of Liberty	29.82	47.99		NY 55 west (Lake Street)	Western end of NY 55 concurrency
Sullivan	Village of Liberty	30.04	48.34		NY 55 east (Neversink Road)	Eastern end of NY 55 concurrency
Sullivan	Town of Liberty	31.45	50.61		Future I-86 / NY 17 – Monticello, New York City, Binghamton	Exit 100 on NY 17
Sullivan	Town of Fallsburg	38.52	61.99		NY 42 south – Monticello	Western end of NY 42 concurrency; hamlet of Woodbourne
Sullivan	Town of Fallsburg	38.79	62.43		NY 42 north – Grahamsville	Eastern end of NY 42 concurrency; hamlet of Woodbourne
Ulster	Ellenville	50.29	80.93		US 209 (Main Street)	
Orange	Crawford	62.47	100.54		NY 302 south – Bullville	Northern terminus of NY 302; hamlet of Pine Bush
Orange	Walden	69.88	112.46		NY 208 north – Wallkill	Western end of NY 208 concurrency
Orange	Walden	69.94	112.56		NY 208 south – Maybrook	Eastern end of NY 208 concurrency
Orange	Town of Newburgh	77.18	124.21		NY 300 to I-87 / New York Thruway – Wallkill, Vails Gate	Hamlet of Gardnertown
Orange	Town of Newburgh	78.84	126.88	Western end of freeway section		
Orange	Town of Newburgh	78.84	126.88	37	I-84 west to I-87 Toll / New York Thruway	Western end of I-84 concurrency
Orange	Town of Newburgh	80.43	129.44	39	US 9W / NY 32 – Newburgh, Highland, New Paltz, West Point	Signed as exits 39A (US 9W south) & 39B (US 9W north) westbound; last eastbound exit before toll
Hudson River		81.62	131.35	Hamilton Fish Newburgh–Beacon Bridge (eastbound toll)		
Dutchess	Town of Fishkill	83.03	133.62	41	NY 9D / NY 52 Bus. east – Beacon, Wappingers Falls	
Dutchess	Town of Fishkill	86.18	138.69	44	I-84 east / NY 52 Bus. west to Taconic State Parkway	Eastern end of I-84 concurrency
Dutchess	Town of Fishkill	86.18	138.69	Eastern end of freeway section		
Dutchess	Village of Fishkill	87.28	140.46		US 9 – Peekskill, Wappingers Falls	
Dutchess	Town of Fishkill	88.94	143.14		NY 82 north – Hopewell Junction	Southern terminus of NY 82; hamlet of Brinckerhoff
Dutchess	East Fishkill	93.33	150.20		NY 376 north – Hopewell Junction	Southern terminus of NY 376; hamlet of East Fishkill
Dutchess	East Fishkill	94.27	151.71		Taconic State Parkway	Exit 38 on Taconic State Parkway
Dutchess	East Fishkill	95.44	153.60		NY 216 east – Stormville	Western terminus of NY 216
Putnam	Kent	100.00	160.93		I-84 / CR 43 south (Ludingtonville Road)	Northern terminus of CR 43; exit 58 on I-84
Putnam	Kent	105.35	169.54		NY 311 north to I-84 – Patterson	Southern terminus of NY 311; hamlet of Lake Carmel
Putnam	Town of Carmel	108.44	174.52		NY 301 west to Taconic State Parkway	Eastern terminus of NY 301; hamlet of Carmel
Putnam	Town of Carmel	108.72	174.97		US 6 to I-84 – Mahopac, Brewster	Eastern terminus
1.000 mi = 1.609 km; 1.000 km = 0.621 mi: Concurrency terminus; Electronic toll collection

== New York State Route 52A ==
New York State Route 52A
- Location: Fosterdale–Kenoza Lake
- Length: 2.78 mi (4.47 km)
- Existed: 1930–present

New York State Route 52A is a 2.78-mile (4.47 km) alternate route of NY 52 in western Sullivan County. The route begins at NY 17B near the hamlet of Fosterdale and continues north and east to its terminus at NY 52 near the north end of Kenoza Lake. It serves mainly to shorten the trip from Callicoon to Liberty via NY 52. The route was assigned as part of the 1930 renumbering of state highways in New York.

The entire route is in Delaware, Sullivan County.

mi	km	Destinations	Notes
0.0	0.0	NY 17B – Callicoon, Fosterdale	Western terminus
2.78	4.47	NY 52 – Jeffersonville, Liberty, Fosterdale	Eastern terminus
1.000 mi = 1.609 km; 1.000 km = 0.621 mi

== New York State Route 52 Business ==
New York State Route 52 Business
- Location: Beacon
- Length: 4.74 mi (7.63 km)
- Existed: 1963–present

New York State Route 52 Business (abbreviated NY 52 Bus.) is a business route of NY 52 that extends for 4.74 miles (7.63 km) through the city of Beacon in Dutchess County. The route is signed as east–west, starting at I-84 / NY 52 exit 41 and NY 9D north of Beacon and ending at I-84 / NY 52 exit 44 southwest of the village of Fishkill, where NY 52 leaves I-84, ending the I-84 / NY 52 concurrency. NY 52 Business is not posted on guide signs on I-84.

NY 52 Business begins at I-84 / NY 52 exit 41 and runs concurrent with NY 9D into Beacon. At Main Street, NY 52 Business leaves NY 9D and follows Main Street east through the Lower Main Street Historic District and across town to Fishkill Avenue. The route turns left onto that street, following Fishkill Avenue out of the city. At Prospect Street, a local road straddling the Beacon city line, NY 52 Business becomes state-maintained as NY 980J, an unsigned reference route.

After Millholland Drive, Fishkill Avenue becomes Fishkill's Main Street before meeting I-84 / NY 52 at exit 44. At the interchange, NY 52 Business, as well as the NY 980J designation, comes to an end while NY 52 continues east along Main Street.The entire route is in Dutchess County.

Location	mi	km	Destinations	Notes
Beacon	0.00	0.00	NY 9D north – Wappingers Falls	Continuation north; western end of NY 9D concurrency
Beacon	0.00	0.00	I-84 / NY 52 to I-87 / New York Thruway / Taconic State Parkway – Newburgh	Exit 41 on I-84
Beacon			NY 9D south (Wolcott Avenue)	Eastern end of NY 9D concurrency
Fishkill	4.74	7.63	I-84 / NY 52 to Taconic State Parkway – Newburgh, Fishkill	Eastern terminus; exit 44 on I-84
1.000 mi = 1.609 km; 1.000 km = 0.621 mi: Concurrency terminus

== See also ==
- List of state routes in New York
