= New York State Route 17B =

State highway in Sullivan County, New York, US

New York State Route 17B
- Map of Sullivan County in southern New York with NY 17B highlighted in red

Route information
- Auxiliary route of NY 17
- Maintained by NYSDOT and Sullivan County
- Length: 21.90 mi (35.24 km)
- Existed: 1930–present

Major junctions
- West end: NY 97 in Callicoon
- East end: Future I-86 / NY 17 in Monticello

Location
- Country: United States
- State: New York
- Counties: Sullivan

Highway system
- New York Highways; Interstate; US; State; Reference; Parkways
← NY 17A	→ NY 17C

New York State Route 17B (NY 17B) is a state highway located entirely within Sullivan County, New York, in the United States. It connects the hamlet of Callicoon at its western end with the Monticello area in the east, ending at a junction with NY 17's exit 104, just northeast of Monticello.

== Route description ==
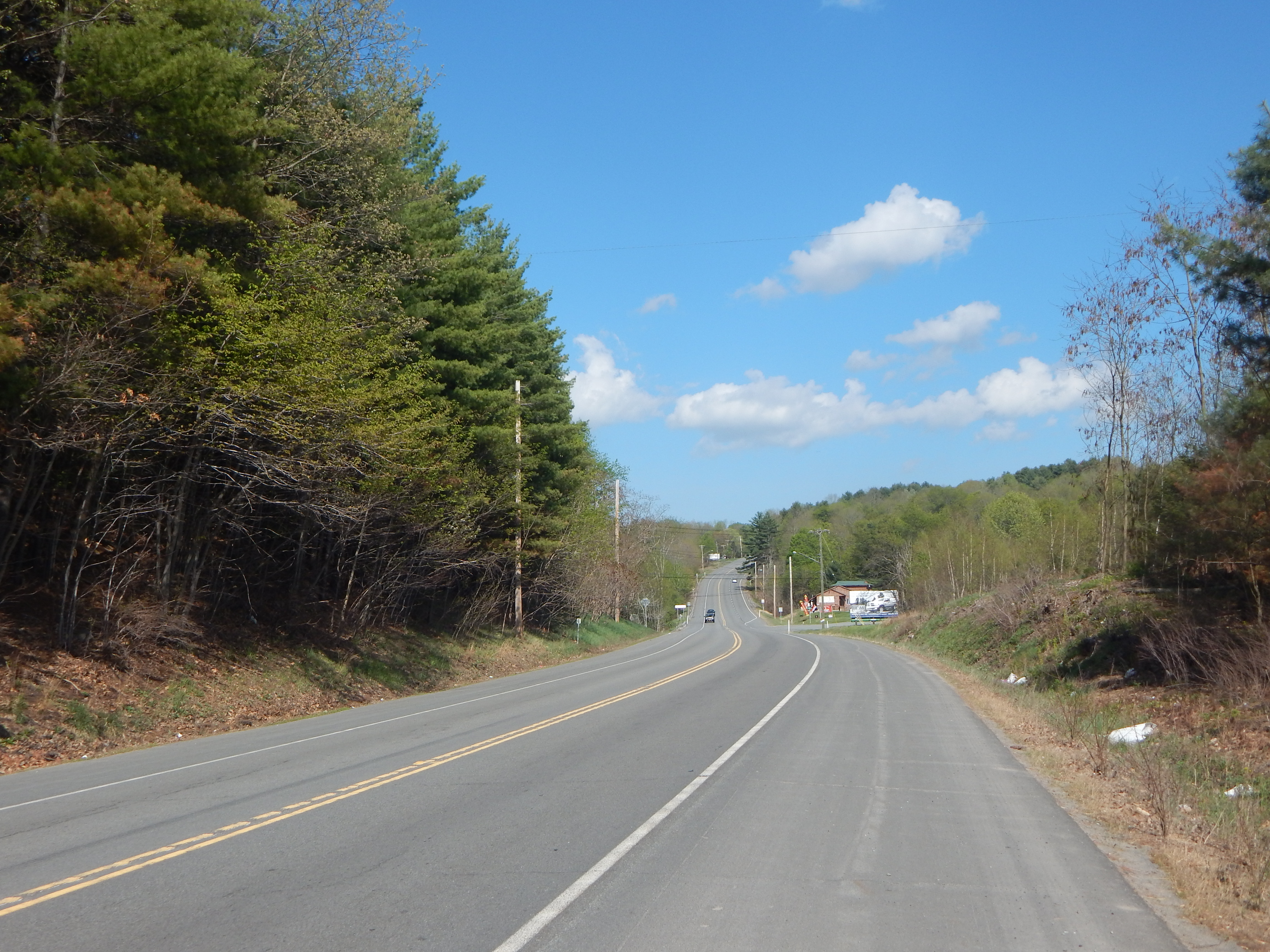
NY 17B in Thompson

NY 17B begins at an intersection with NY 97 in the hamlet of Callicoon. Known as Mill Street for the first block, NY 17B proceeds downhill and meets an intersection with the eastern end of Sullivan County Route 133 (CR 133). After merging with CR 133, NY 17B proceeds east along the East Branch of Callicoon Creek and through the town of Delaware. The mainly rural roadway winds east for several miles, reaching the southern end of the hamlet of Hortonville. Passing the intersection with CR 121, the route crosses through Hortonville before turning southeast, passing multiple industries in the area.

Turning further south, NY 17B continues paralleling the East Branch, passing multiple farms before making several jaunts to the southeast. A short distance later, the route bends east and then northeast, reaching an intersection with NY 52A. At this junction, NY 17B becomes county-maintained and designated CR 117. NY 17B and CR 117 bend southeast again, reaching a junction with NY 52 in the town of Cochecton. NY 17B and NY 52 become concurrent, proceeding southward past multiple farms before reaching the hamlet of Fosterdale. At this junction, NY 52 forks southward at an intersection with CR 114 while NY 17B turns eastward.

NY 17B passes south of Fosterdale Cemetery, passing rows of homes on the northern side of the roadway. The route passes along the southern end of Kazens Pond, crossing junctions with several local roads, including Hurd Road, which connects NY 17B to the Bethel Woods Center for the Arts, the site of the Woodstock Music Festival. Now in the town of Bethel, NY 17B continues eastward, passing south of Lynch's Pond. The route crosses through the hamlet of Odell, passing north of Chestnut Ridge Pond and reaching the hamlet of Bethel. Passing several cemeteries east of Bethel, the route soon reaches the hamlet of White Lake area, intersecting with NY 55 and CR 13.

Running along the southern shore of White Lake, NY 17B and NY 55 proceed east into the hamlet of White Lake, passing numerous lakeside homes on the northern end of the highway. A short distance into White Lake, NY 55 forks north onto CR 14 north towards Swan Lake. NY 17B continues east out White Lake, returning to the rural areas of the town of Bethel. The route bypasses the hamlet of Smallwood, reaching an intersection with CR 183 (Airport Road), which connects to Sullivan County International Airport. NY 17B makes a short dart to the southeast before straightening east again and crossing over the Mongaup River.

After a short parallel with the Mongaup River, NY 17B continues east and soon northeast into the hamlet of Coopers Corners. A short distance outside of Coopers Corners, the route crosses into Maplewood, entering the town of Thompson. The route intersects with CR 59 (Kaufman Road) before reaching Valet Road, which is the access road to Monticello Raceway. The route soon passes the stables for the raceway, passing West Broadway, which connects the route to downtown Monticello. The route soon turns northeast again, crossing Jefferson Street and entering exit 104 of NY 17, which marks the eastern end of NY 17B. The route continues northwest alongside NY 17 as CR 174.

== History ==
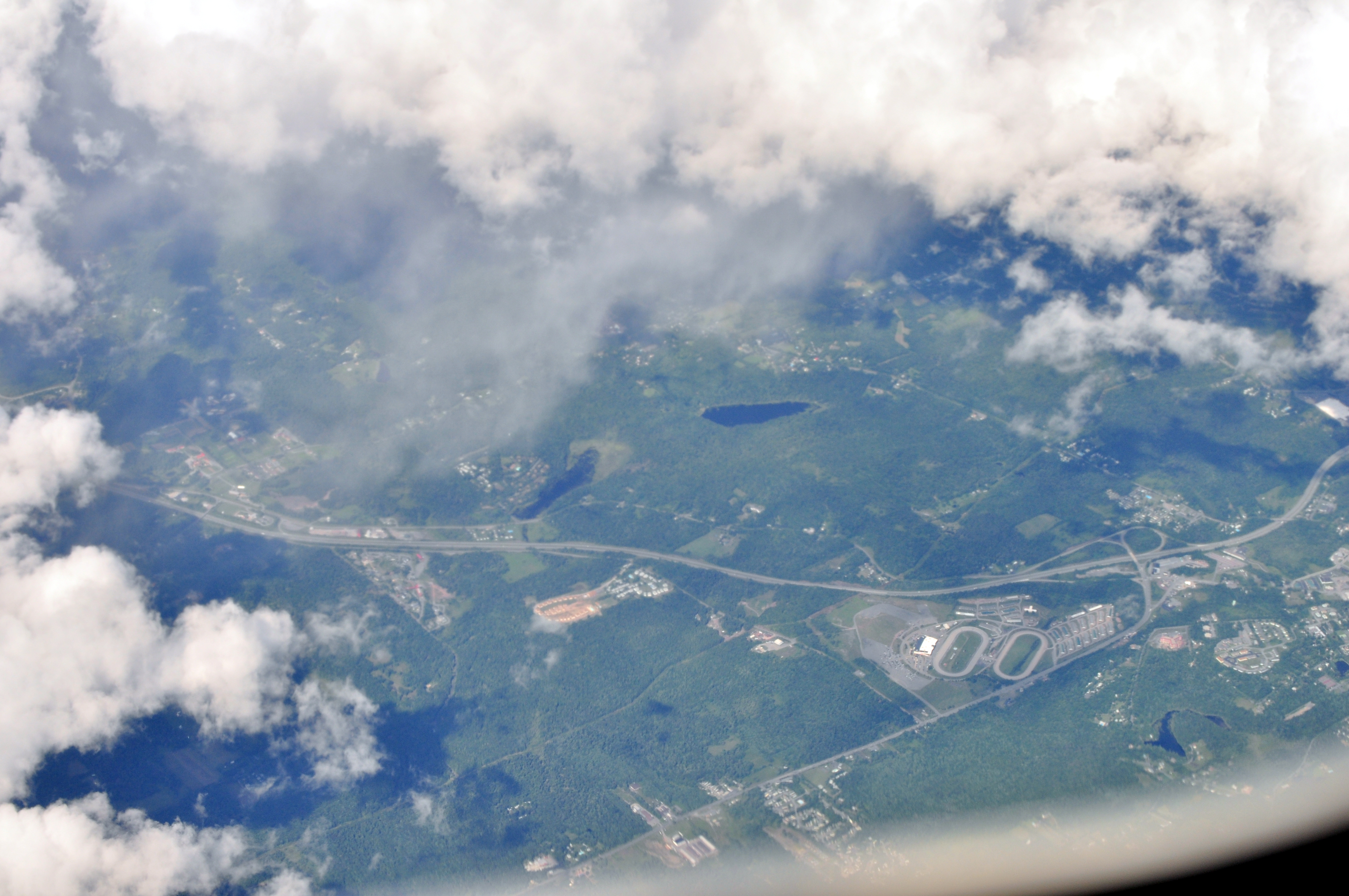
NY 17B (near bottom of photo) joins NY 17 (Future I-86) near the Monticello Raceway at right.

Between Fosterdale and Monticello, NY 17B follows the route of the old Newburgh–Cochecton Turnpike, elsewhere followed by the main NY 17 and, closer to Newburgh, NY 17K. This accounts for the straight, wide route much more amenable to modern vehicular use than the other inland state highways in this half of the county.

NY 17B was assigned in the 1930 renumbering of state highways in New York to its current alignment between Monticello and Callicoon and to modern NY 97 from Callicoon to Hancock. The Callicoon–Hancock portion of the route was co-designated as part of NY 97 in 1939 following the completion of that route south of Callicoon. The concurrency was eliminated in the mid-1960s when NY 17B was cut back to its current western terminus in Callicoon.

== Major intersections ==
The entire route is in Sullivan County.

Location	mi	km	Destinations	Notes
Town of Delaware	0.00	0.00	NY 97 – Port Jervis, Hancock	Western terminus; hamlet of Callicoon
Town of Delaware	5.23	8.42	NY 52A east – Jeffersonville	Western terminus of NY 52A
Cochecton	6.47	10.41	NY 52 east – Kenoza Lake, Jeffersonville	West end of NY 52 overlap
Cochecton	6.93	11.15	NY 52 west – Lake Huntington, Cochecton	East end of NY 52 overlap; hamlet of Fosterdale
Bethel	14.12	22.72	NY 55 west – Eldred, Barryville	West end of NY 55 overlap
Bethel	14.86	23.91	NY 55 east – Swan Lake, Liberty	East end of NY 55 overlap; hamlet of White Lake
Monticello	21.90	35.24	Future I-86 / NY 17 – New York, Binghamton	Eastern terminus; exit 104 on NY 17
1.000 mi = 1.609 km; 1.000 km = 0.621 mi: Concurrency terminus
