= Jamesburgh =

Jamesburgh may refer to:

- Jamesburgh, California, former name of Jamesburg, California
- Jamesburgh, New York, former name of Walker Valley, New York
