= Fishkill Village District =

Historic district in New York, United States

- U.S. National Register of Historic Places
- U.S. Historic district
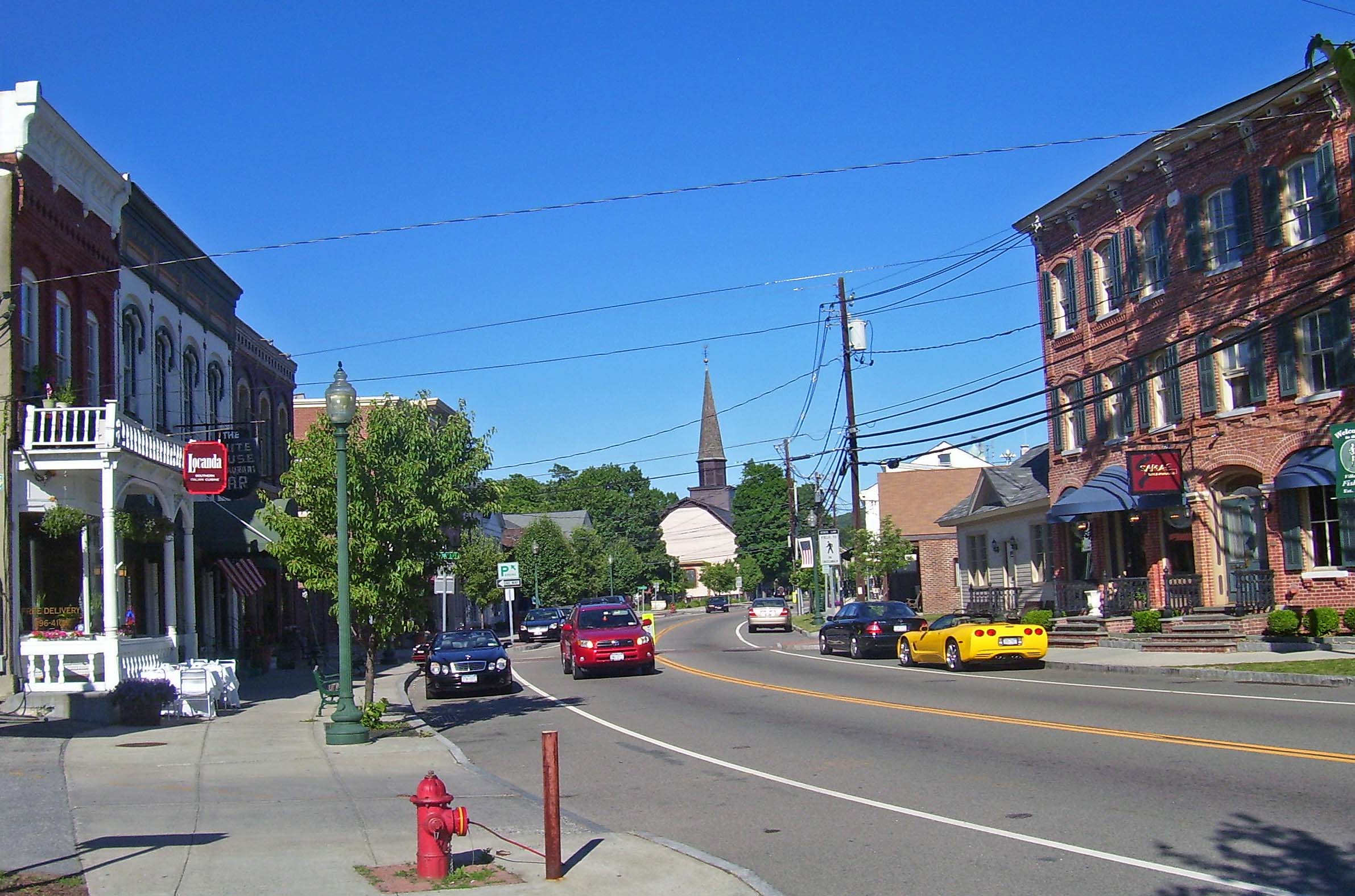
- Historic buildings along Main Street (NY 52) in the village of Fishkill

- Location within New York Location within the United States
- Location: Roughly along NY 52 from Cary St. to Hopewell St., Fishkill, NY
- Nearest city: Beacon
- Coordinates: 41°32′08″N 73°54′09″W
- Area: 180 acres (73 ha)
- Architectural style: Greek Revival
- NRHP reference No.: 73001181
- Added to NRHP: March 20, 1973

The Fishkill Village District is a federally recognized historic district in the New York community. It is roughly defined as Main Street (NY 52) between Cary and Hopewell streets. Of the 108 buildings within this district, those that are contributing properties date from between the late 18th century to the late 19th century. A variety of architectural styles are represented, but predominant among them are several Greek Revival buildings.

It was added to the National Register of Historic Places in 1973.
