= Pennsylvania Route 652 =

State highway in Wayne County, Pennsylvania, US

Pennsylvania Route 652

Route information
- Maintained by PennDOT and JIBC
- Length: 10.559 mi (16.993 km)
- Existed: March 14, 1972–present

Major junctions
- West end: US 6 in Indian Orchard
- East end: NY 52 / CR 24 in Darbytown

Location
- Country: United States
- State: Pennsylvania
- Counties: Wayne

Highway system
- Pennsylvania State Route System; Interstate; US; State; Scenic; Legislative
← PA 651	→ PA 653

Pennsylvania Route 652 (PA 652) is a 10.559-mile-long (16.993 km) east–west state highway located in the northeast Pennsylvania county of Wayne. The western terminus of the route is at U.S. Route 6 (US 6) in the Texas Township community of Indian Orchard. The highways heads to the northeast, and reaches the eastern terminus at the New York-Pennsylvania border in Damascus Township, where PA 652 crosses the Narrowsburg–Darbytown Bridge over the Delaware River and into New York, continuing as New York State Route 52 (NY 52) and County Route 24 (CR 24) in Sullivan County.

The highway originated as the easternmost stretch of US 106 when the United States Highway System was first put together in 1926. The route, however, was assigned as a state highway in 1920. PA 652 was once used south of the alignment, in the northern suburbs in Philadelphia. PA 652 remained on that alignment until 1946, and in 1972, the PA 652 designation was reassigned onto the US 106 alignment.

== Route description ==
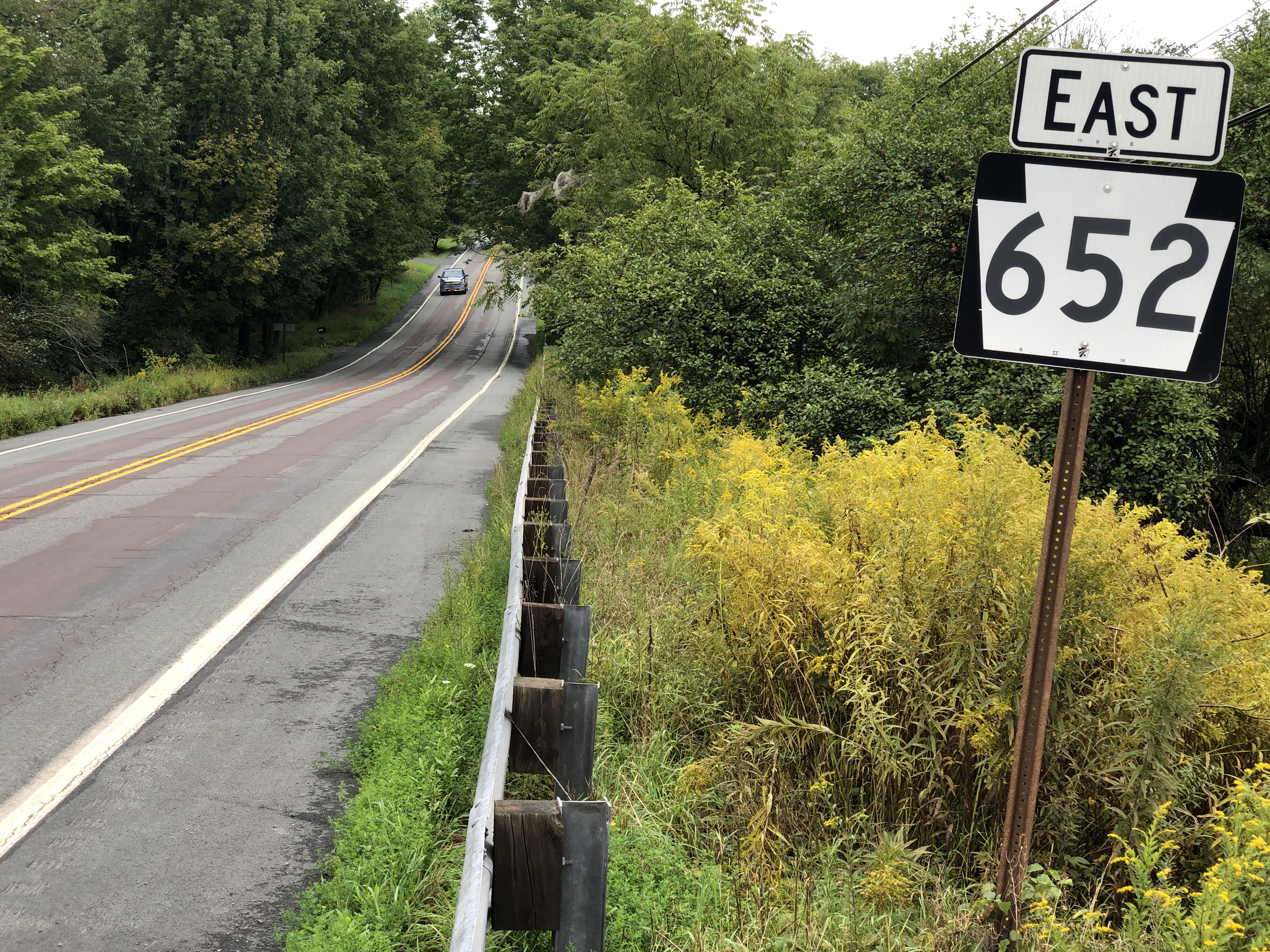
PA 652 eastbound east of Beach Lake

PA 652 begins at an intersection with US 6 (Texas–Palmyra Highway / Grand Army of the Republic Highway) in the village of Indian Orchard. PA 652 progresses northeast as a two-lane local road through Texas Township as the Beach Lake Highway. Crossing into the village of Bethel, the route winds northeast through Berlin Township and enters Beach Lake. PA 652 is the main road through downtown Beach Lake, crossing an intersection with Milanville Road, which connects to the Skinners Falls-Milanville Bridge.

After Beach Lake, PA 652 wanders northeast past Little Beach Pond and into Damascus Township. In Damascus, PA 652 enters a more wooded region of the county until Woodland Drive, where it becomes primarily residential once again. The route soon bends eastward then to the southeast at Kaiser Street, reaching the Delaware River as it enters Darbytown. Running eastward along the river, PA 652 reaches the Narrowsburg-Darbytown Bridge, where it crosses the river into the state of New York, where it continues as NY 52 and CR 24 in Narrowsburg.

== History ==
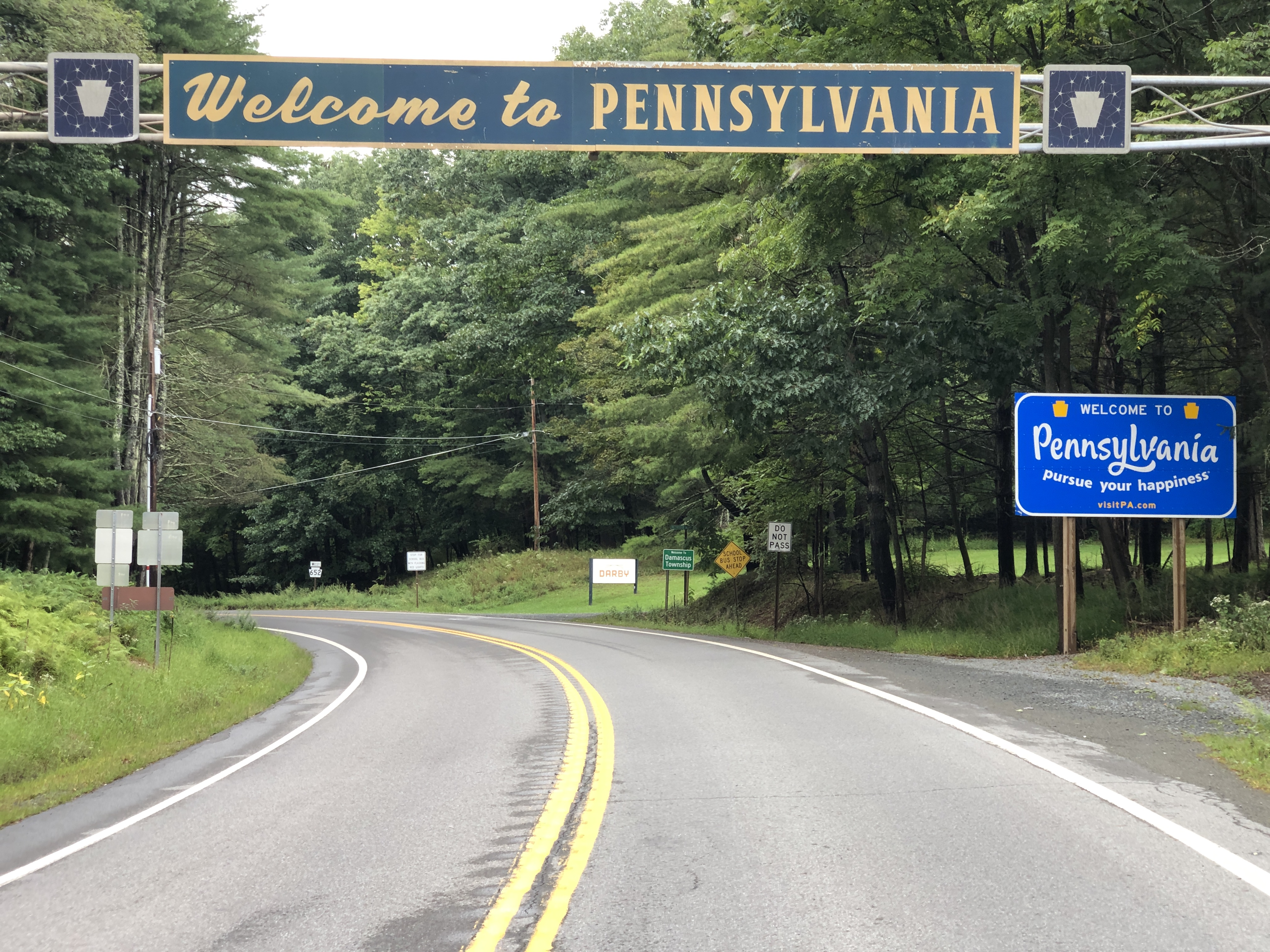
Entering Pennsylvania on PA 652. The newer style of sign is visible nearby

PA 652 was first assigned in 1928 to a series of local streets in the northwestern suburbs of Philadelphia. The southern terminus of the route was at the modern US 30/Old Eagle School Road intersection on the Chester–Delaware county line near Devon to the west and Wayne to the east. PA 652 followed Old Eagle School Road north to King of Prussia, where the route turned east onto East Swedesford Road. At the location of the modern US 422/US 202 interchange, PA 652 turned north onto Guthrie Road, running alongside the right-of-way of what is now the US 422 expressway to North Gulph Road. PA 652 continued north on North Gulph Road to the Valley Forge National Historical Park, where it terminated at PA 23.

In 1946, PA 652 was transferred to the control of the local suburbs along its entire length, and control of the roads went to local highway departments. The portion of the route between Guthrie Road and PA 23 returned to state control in 1967 when PA 363 was routed onto North Gulph Road.

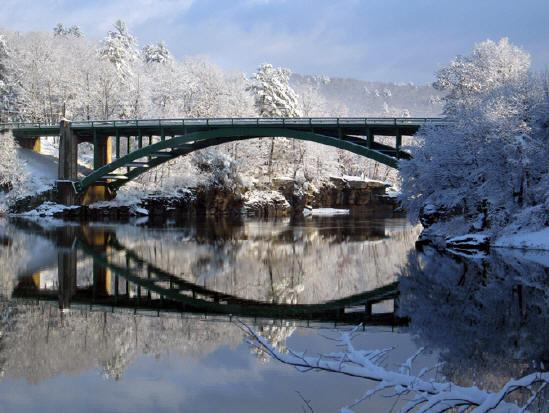
Narrowsburg-Darbytown bridge as seen post 2018 refurbishment.

The current alignment of PA 652 was classified as a state highway as early as 1920, nine years after the Sproul Road Bill was passed by the Pennsylvania State Legislature. The Sproul Road Bill also assigned the first state highways in Pennsylvania. There was no designation given to the highway. From 1926 to 1972, the modern routing of PA 652 was part of US 106. The road also carried a portion of PA 19 from 1927 to 1930. On March 14, 1972, US 106 was decommissioned and replaced with the PA 652 designation between Indian Orchard and the Delaware River. Signs were changed by April of that year.

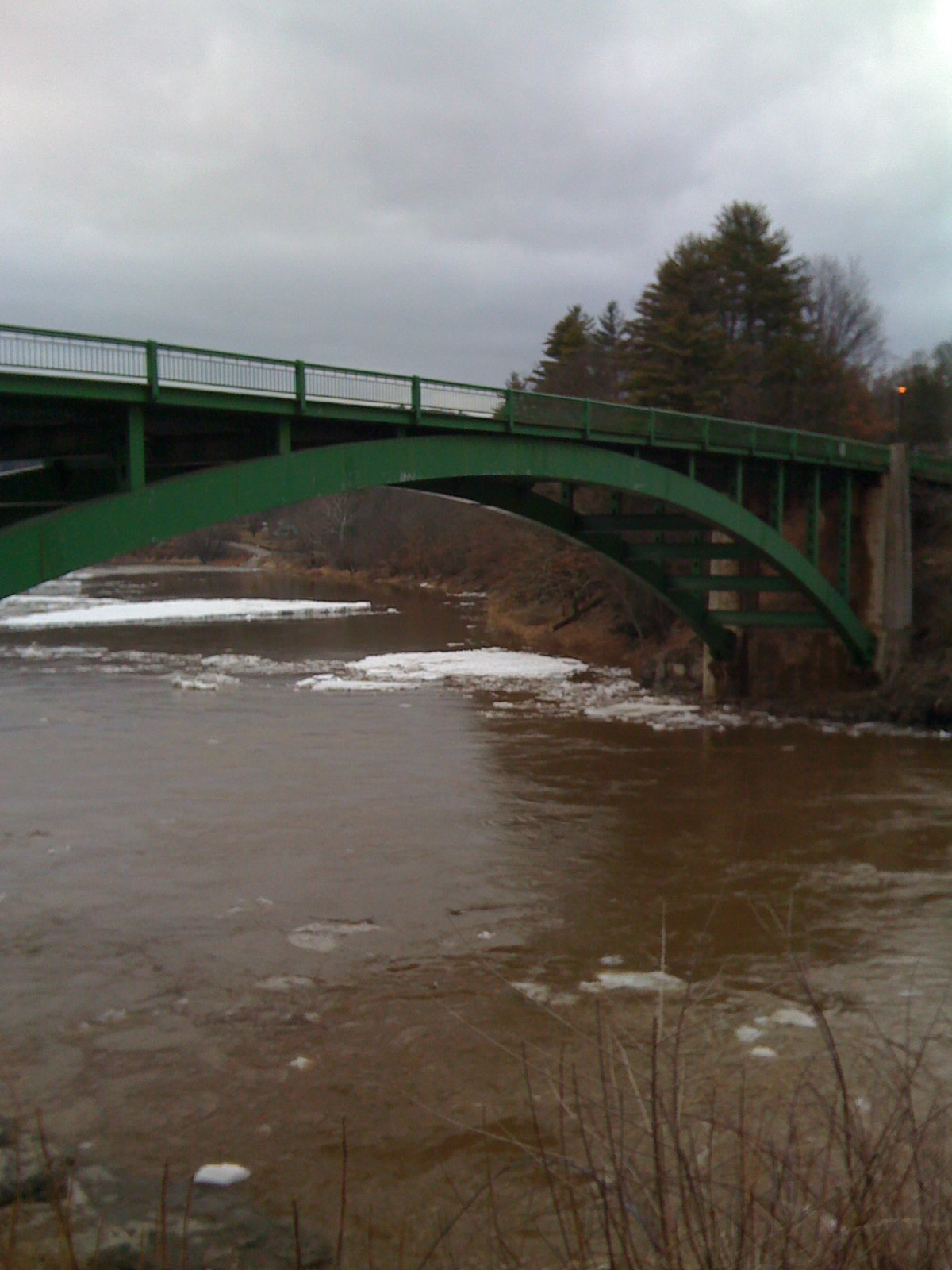
The Narrowsburg–Darbytown Bridge over the Delaware River. The state line is about mid-span, serving as PA 652's northern terminus. As seen prior to 2018 repairs.

PA 652 has a consistent stretch of water crossings that helps put the highway together. The first bridge along the highway, built in 1925, was the US 106 bridge spanning a tributary of the Delaware River. The concrete-paved span was reconstructed in 1980 and crosses the tributary into New York on a 50.85 feet (15.50 m) long span. The next bridge was the current Narrowsburg–Darbytown Bridge, built in 1954 over the Delaware. In 2012, the bridge was deemed structurally deficient according to the United States Department of Transportation. In 2013, the bridge underwent emergency repairs that were estimated between $200,000 and $250,000. There were also plans announced for the middle of 2017 into 2018 to make structural repairs and paving work. Those plans for repairs, repaving and repainting were done in 2018. The bridge is 425 feet (130 m) long and made of steel.

The final two bridges were constructed in 1964. The first was constructed for US 106 over Indian Orchard Brook. It is located about 500 feet (150 m) east of State Route 2011 (Poor Farm Road). It is a structurally deficient, 20.99 feet (6.40 m) concrete bridge. There is no recorded estimate for replacement costs. The second bridge is also over Indian Orchard Brook, and is in Texas Township. The bridge is 41.99 feet (12.80 m) long and built out of concrete, which handles an average of 6,804 commuters a year.

== Major intersections ==
The entire route is in Wayne County.

Location	mi	km	Destinations	Notes
Texas Township	0.000	0.000	US 6 (Texas Palmyra Highway) – Hawley, Honesdale	Western terminus
Delaware River	10.559	16.993	Narrowsburg–Darbytown Bridge	
Delaware River	10.559	16.993	NY 52 east (Bridge Street) to NY 97 – Narrowsburg	New York state line; eastern terminus
1.000 mi = 1.609 km; 1.000 km = 0.621 mi
