= Youngsville, New York =

- Hamlet
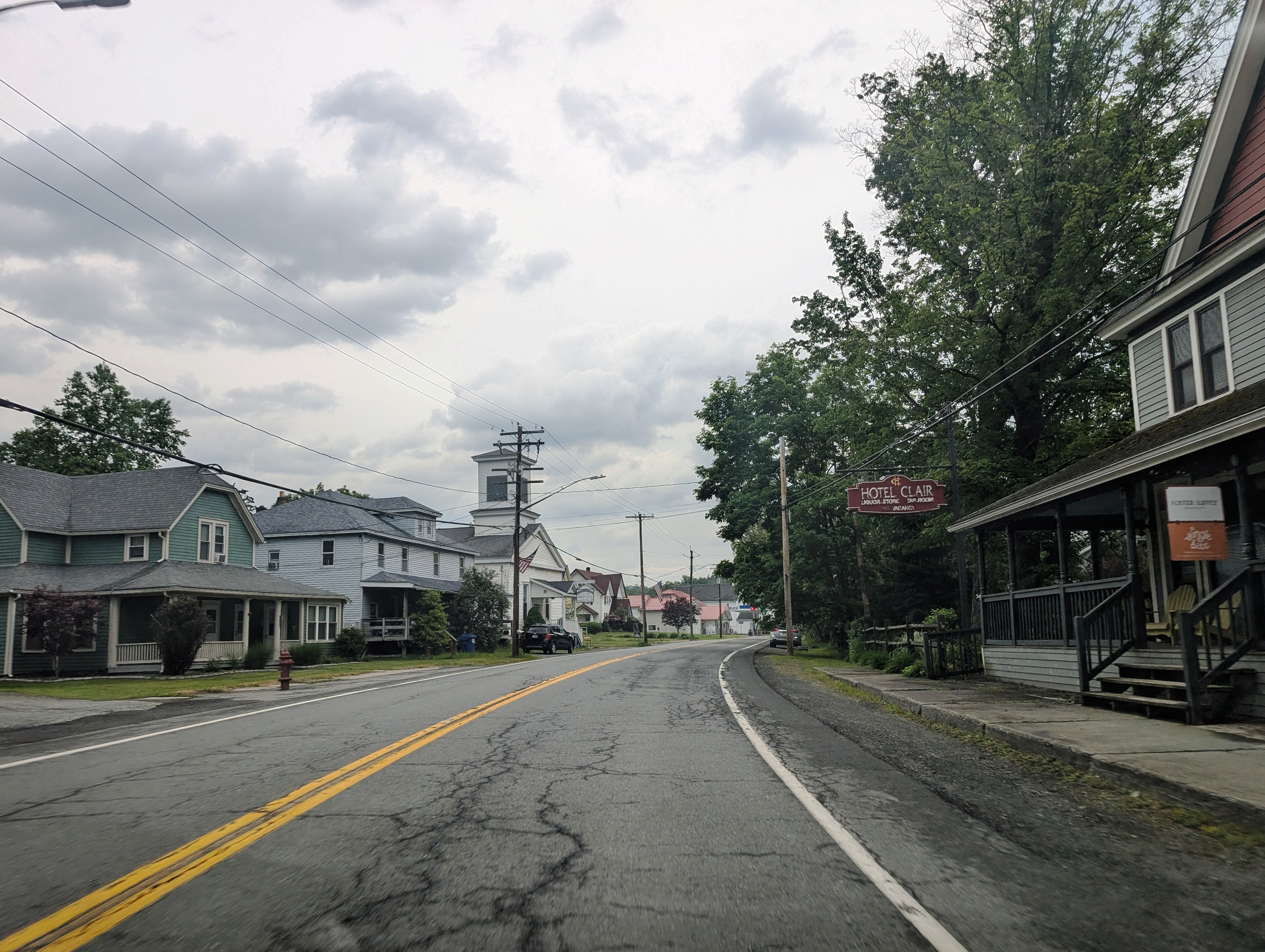
- NY 52 eastbound through Youngsville

- Location within New York Location within the United States
- Coordinates: 41°48′30″N 74°53′11″W
- Country: United States
- State: New York
- County: Sullivan
- Elevation: 1,197 ft (365 m)
- Time zone: UTC-5 (Eastern (EST))
  - Summer (DST): UTC-4 (EDT)
- ZIP code: 12791
- Area code: 845
- GNIS feature ID: 971862

Youngsville is a hamlet in Sullivan County, New York, United States. The community is located in the Town of Callicoon along New York State Route 52, 7.2 miles (11.6 km) west of Liberty. Youngsville has a post office with ZIP code 12791, which opened on March 10, 1851.
