= Walden Jam-e-Masjid =

Historic former church in New York, United States

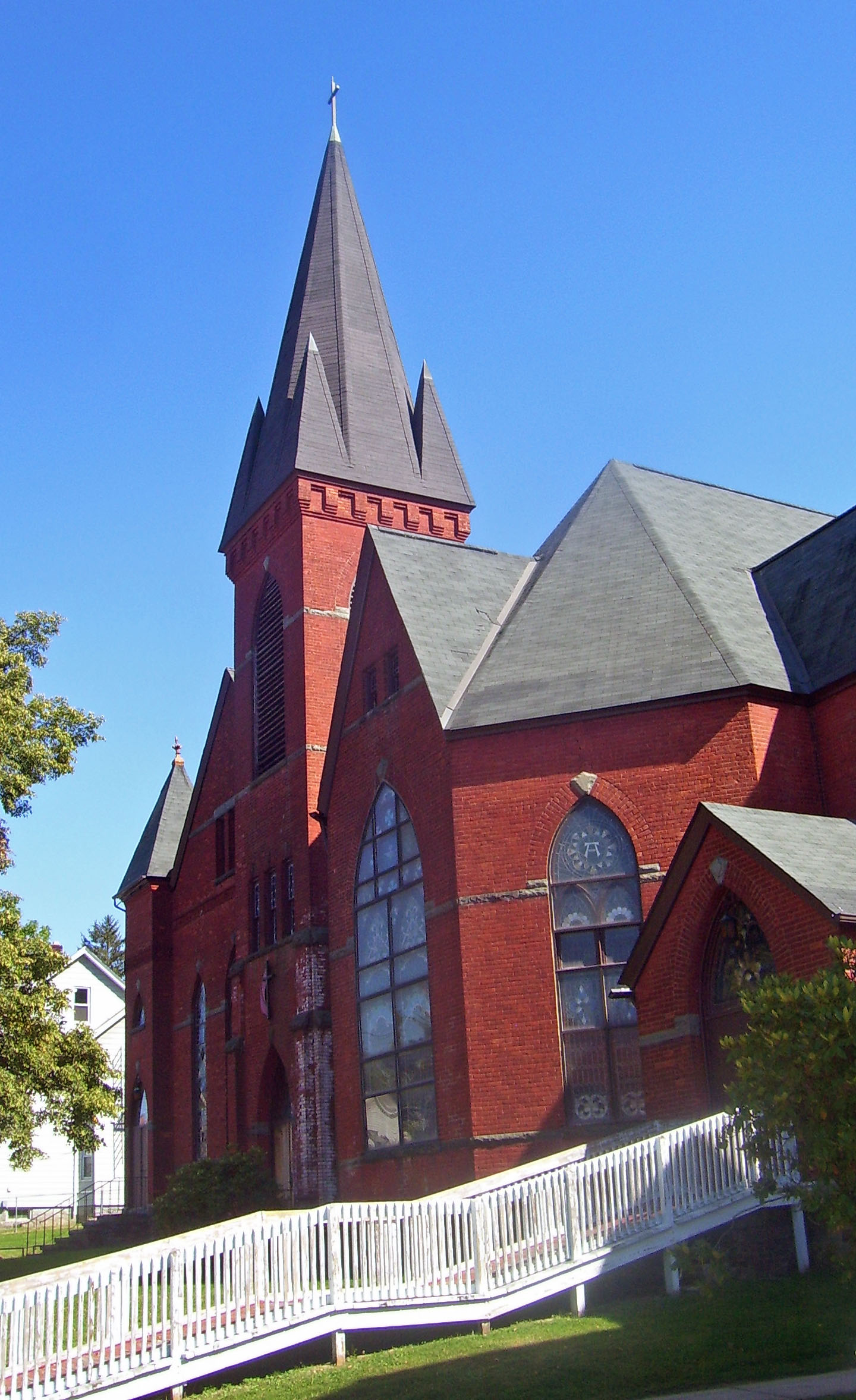
- North elevation and west profile, 2008

Religion
- Affiliation: Islam

Location
- Location: Walden, NY
- Interactive map of Walden Jam-e-Masjid
- Coordinates: 41°33′37″N 74°11′30″W

Architecture
- Style: Victorian Gothic
- General contractor: N/A
- Groundbreaking: 1893
- Completed: 1893

Specifications
- Direction of façade: north
- Length: 90 feet (27 m)
- Width: 60 feet (18 m)
- Height (max): 100 ft (30 m)
- Materials: Stone, brick, asphalt, wood

U.S. National Register of Historic Places
- Added to NRHP: February 28, 2008
- NRHP Reference no.: 08000103

Website
- ["https://darulquranwassunnah.org/"/ Darul Quran Wassunah]

The Walden Jam-e-Masjid, formerly the Historic Walden United Methodist Church, is a mosque located in Walden, New York, United States. It was desanctified in 2013 and sold by the congregation the following year. The building was repurposed as a mosque by a Muslim congregation after being purchased in 2022.

The historic former church is a brick building constructed in the late 19th century, for a congregation dating to 1817. Primarily in the late Victorian Gothic architectural style, its complex massing and decoration include elements of other contemporary modes such as Romanesque Revival. Its ornate interior, originally built in the Akron Plan, reflects changing thinking regarding church interior design from the era of its construction.

It has survived mostly intact to the present. The current building incorporates part of an earlier church on the same site built in 1840 for another church. In the early 20th century a parsonage was built next door, and other facilities were built later in the century to the south. Due to increasing maintenance costs, the congregation voted to move to the new site and build another church there. In 2008 the historic former church was listed on the National Register of Historic Places.

== Building ==
The former church's lot is located at the southeast corner of West Main and Pine streets, on the western edge of downtown, on the opposite corner of the same large block from St. Andrew's Episcopal Church, also listed on the National Register. The ground slopes gently west towards the Wallkill River. The church's main bell tower rises well above tree level, making the church a prominent aspect of the village skyline when viewed from the west.

There are three buildings on the property: the mosque (the only contributing resource to the listing), its parsonage to the east and a rental property to the west, all facing on West Main. A parking lot with its entrance on Pine Street is behind the buildings, along with a fenced-in playground. In front is a small lawn, sloping gently to the sidewalk, with a large mature tree and shrubbery on the side.

=== Exterior ===
The dark red painted brick exterior of the mosque is complemented by black asphalt roofing and rough-hewn bluestone courses. It has three sections: a fellowship hall on the east, central bell tower and worship section on the west. They create a north (front) facade that starts with the three-bay gabled roof. Tall Gothic arched windows, the center one larger than those on the flanks, with bluestone sills and keystones, are centered in the first story, with a pair of smaller double-hung sash windows in the apex, set off by a brickwork course.

At the northeast corner is a tower. Six stone steps and a railing lead to its ground-floor entrance, with paired batten doors in a Gothic opening with a similar treatment as the fellowship hall windows. Above it is a stained glass transom and small lozenge-shaped window above. Decorative corbeling marks the roofline and the transition to a pyramidal roof with finial.

The ground floot of the three-stage bell tower has a Gothic door similar to, but larger, than the northeast tower. On either side are corner buttresses. They rise to the bluestone course that sets off the second stage, and also serves as the sill for a group of three small sash windows. The third stage harbors the bell, with large arched louvered openings rising from another belt course, split by a third at the impost. Above the corbeled roofline, the octagonal spire rises, topped by a cross and set off with four small pyramids at the corners, to 100 feet (30 m) high.

At the worship space, a three-sided steeply pitched gabled section projects from the pyramid-roofed main block. The wall spaces on the bay have large windows similar to those on the fellowship hall. Those on the side sections are subdivided into two smaller arched windows below the impost, and two small windows are located in the gable apex. At the extreme west is a third entry, a projecting gabled vestibule with similar doors leading to a white wooden wheelchair ramp.

The east profile has five tall square-headed windows with bluestone trim. On the southeast is a gabled block used for the outreach office, aligned with the roof crest parallel to the wall. The west elevation has three gables, with the middle one larger. It has three arched windows similar to the other ones; the flanking gables have small lozenges in their apexes. In the center apex are two smaller trabeated windows. On this section is an engaged endwall chimney, consisting of two that rise separately and then join at the apex. It is parged in a tan-colored substance. At the southwest is a small two-by-two-bay flat-roofed brick classroom addition with segmental arch window openings now filled with modern aluminum sash windows.

On the rear facade are the two rear bays of the classroom addition, a bricked-in window on another gabled projection and seven segmented-arch windows (one also bricked in) in the choir alcove. There is also a shed-roofed projection between the south wall and west addition, and two more second story trabeated windows.

=== Interior ===
The tower entrance leads into a vestibule that leads directly into the worship area. Oak slip pews, with scroll armrests and hymnal racks on the rear, are arranged in semicircular fashion around a dais and organ opposite. Doors on the south lead to two classrooms.

The plaster on sawn lath walls have beaded wainscoting, stained lighter than the chair rail at its top. They rise to vaulted ceilings finished in deep-stained thin-width board with molded wood ribs and paterae at vault intersections. Flat surfaces between the roof and ceiling are marked by a plaster cornice. Circular fluted columns with similarly shaped capitals support the roof timber.

On the east, a similar vestibule, connected to the main one by a hallway and stairs, leads into the fellowship room. It is similarly decorated, but more modestly, with acoustic tiles covering its ceiling. The windows have flat molding indicating that they survive from the 1840s predecessor to the current building. Four are memorial stained glass; two are figural while the other two are architectural.

The remaining rooms are furnished more modestly, in modern styles. The basement areas have flagstone floors and painted cinderblock walls.

=== Aesthetics ===
The mosque's original layout followed Lewis Miller's Akron Plan, in which the Sunday school and worship areas were adjacent, with sliding partitions allowing for controlled access between the two. It could also be used to expand the worship space for overflow crowds. This arrangement had apparently been abandoned by the early 1920s in favor of fixed walls and room sizes.

Another feature of the former that reflects the era of its construction is the auditorium-style worship space, in which the pews are arranged in a semicircle around the dais. It was a popular way to maximize available worship space, allowing for clearer sightlines from all seats. The only aspect of the plan the former Walden Methodist Church lacks is the inclined floor.

The building's exterior is eclectic, another late 19th century touch, reflecting the move away from the early Gothic Revival's insistence on historically correct detail. Victorian Gothic, seen in the high lancet windows accentuated by the steep roofs and towers. The stone belt courses amid the red brick facade and understated polychromy are also more distinctly High Victorian Gothic, showing the influence of John Ruskin's aesthetic theories and the Venetian Gothic. On the other hand, the corbelling at the towers suggests a Romanesque Revival nod, and the upper gable of the fellowship hall suggests Richardsonian Romanesque.

Inside, the rich decoration was meant to enhance the character of the worship service. The stained glass floods the hall with mellow-toned natural light, augmented by electric light fixtures hung from the ceiling. The most important aspect of the interior is the intricate vaulted ceiling. All reflected an era when Protestant church interiors were moving away from the asceticism that had characterized them earlier in the century, with the intent of providing an atmosphere more conducive to the proper spirit of worship.

== History ==
=== Beginnings ===
The first Methodist meetings in Walden, then known as Walden's Mills, were held around 1817. At first congregants used the services of an itinerant preacher, and met in the ballroom of a local tavern. Later they used a schoolhouse on what is today Ulster Avenue (NY 208).

By 1850 the congregation decided that it needed a church of its own, and a committee was formed to bring that about. It bought for $1,000 ($39,000 in contemporary dollars) the former Scotch Covenanter Society church built at the present site in 1840. It was expanded in 1870 to keep pace with the church's steady growth during the late 19th century.

As the century continued and the village grew and prospered, so did the church. In the late 1880s members began discussing building a new one, as there were over 350 of them with almost as many in Sunday school each week. Under a new pastor, The Rev. J.M. Cornish, those plans began to take more definite form.

A subscription drive brought the church $11,000 ($36,000 in contemporary dollars). It is not known who the architect was. The general contractor, Edwin McWilliams of Middletown broke ground in spring 1893. A cornerstone-laying ceremony in August of that year featured the district's presiding elder and a 40-year member of the congregation, from the days when Walden United Methodist had just moved into the building being replaced. The old church was moved to the east and enclosed in brick to serve as the new church's Sunday school.

=== Renovations ===
The first significant change to the building came in 1906 when four stained glass windows were added to the east facade of the fellowship hall. In 1911 the parsonage was built on the church's west. It is two-and-a-half-story gabled Queen Anne Style home that has since been resided in vinyl and thus is not considered contributing to the National Register listing.

At some point prior to the 1920s the partitions and fluid space of the Akron Plan interior were abandoned in favor of fixed walls. This would be compensated for by the 1933 addition of the classroom wing onto the southwest corner. In 1952 came another addition, a small office block on the southeast.

Later on in the 20th century, in the early 1960s, an engineering and construction campaign led to the excavation of a new basement and additional facilities below ground level. In the 1990s and 2000s, the wheelchair ramps were added.

=== Sale and repurposing into mosque ===
Maintenance costs for the building were still considerable enough that in 2007, members of the congregation voted narrowly to explore moving to a new site and constructing a new church. They noted that the building needed $2 million of repairs, and that a third of the church's budget went to annual operating and maintenance costs, meaning that only six cents of every donated dollar could be used for church activities.

Some dissenting members felt that their fellow congregants were acting too hastily, that the building could be saved. They also noted that only 95 of 344 eligible members voted, and felt those who were absent should have been allowed to vote as well.

In November 2022, the building was purchased by Darul Quran WasSunnah, a non-profit Islam organization, and repurposed into a mosque.

== See also ==
- National Register of Historic Places listings in Orange County, New York
