= Kenoza Lake, New York =

- Hamlet
- Location within New York Location within the United States
- Coordinates: 41°44′00″N 74°56′59″W
- Country: United States
- State: New York
- County: Sullivan
- Town: Cochecton
- Elevation: 1,060 ft (320 m)
- Time zone: UTC-5 (Eastern (EST))
  - Summer (DST): UTC-4 (EDT)
- ZIP code: 12750
- Area code: 845
- GNIS feature ID: 954518

Kenoza Lake is a hamlet in the town of Cochecton, Sullivan County, New York, United States. The community is located along New York State Route 52, 14.5 miles (23.3 km) west-northwest of Monticello. Kenoza Lake has a post office with ZIP code 12750, which opened on March 10, 1851.
