= Walker Valley, New York =

- CDP
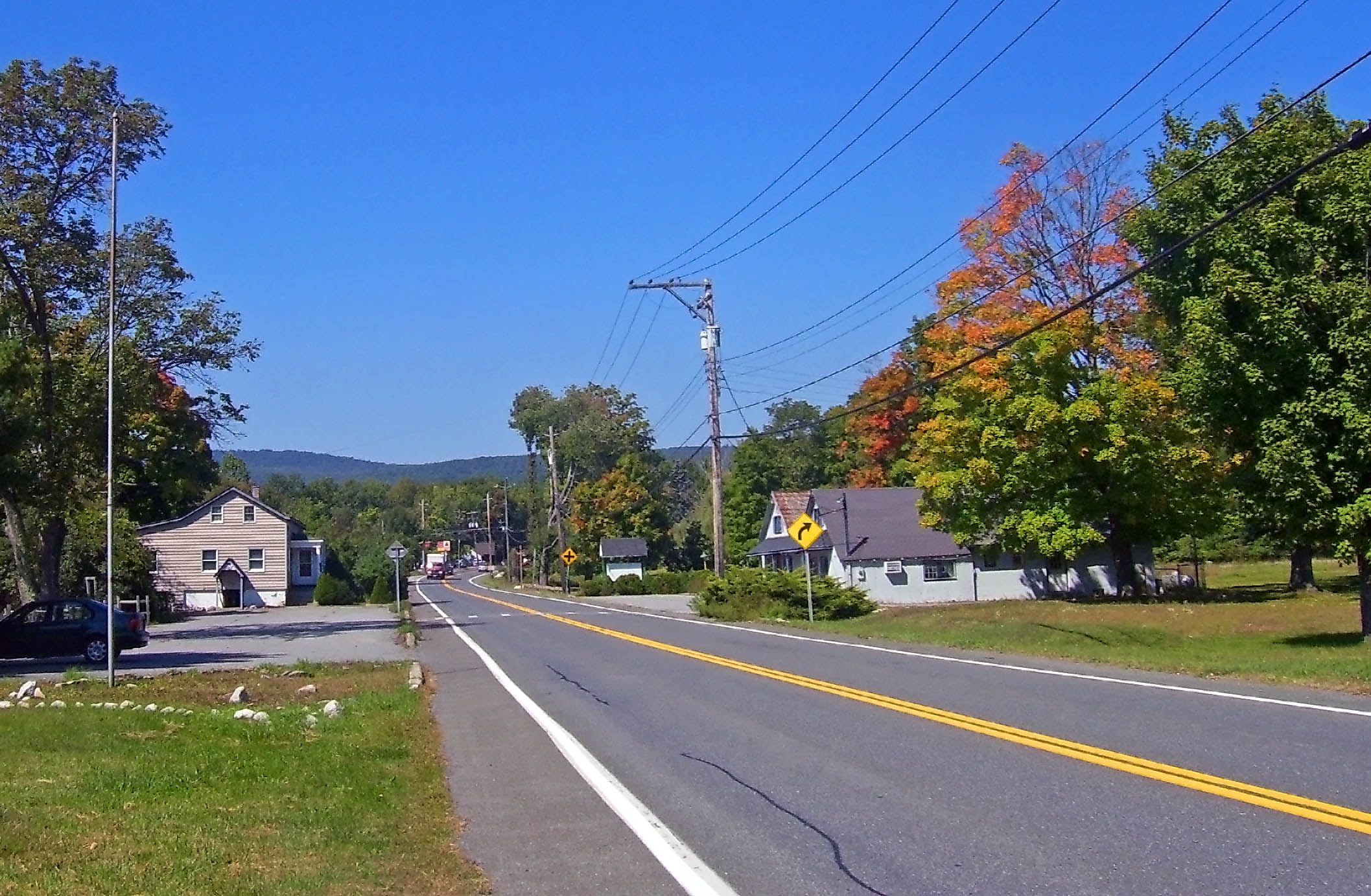
- Looking into Walker Valley from the east along NY 52

- Location in Ulster County and the state of New York.
- Coordinates: 41°38′32″N 74°22′21″W
- Country: United States
- State: New York
- County: Ulster

Area
  - Total: 3.25 sq mi (8.41 km^{2})
  - Land: 3.24 sq mi (8.39 km^{2})
  - Water: 0.012 sq mi (0.03 km^{2})
- Elevation: 663 ft (202 m)

Population (2020)
  - Total: 1,269
  - Density: 391.9/sq mi (151.33/km^{2})
- Time zone: UTC-5 (Eastern (EST))
  - Summer (DST): UTC-4 (EDT)
- ZIP code: 12588
- Area code: 845
- FIPS code: 36-77948
- GNIS feature ID: 0973199

Walker Valley is a hamlet (and census-designated place) located in the western part of the Town of Shawangunk in Ulster County, New York, United States, generally thought of as coterminous with the 12588 ZIP code. The population was 1,269 at the 2020 census.

Walker Valley is one of the three geographic sections of the town that local residents use (The other two are Wallkill and Pine Bush). It is centered on NY 52 in the western part of town, where it begins to slope up to the Shawangunk Ridge.

== History ==
The Walker Valley Area was home to the Delaware Native Americans until the late 1700s, around the time the area was settled by the Dutch. Originally named Jamesburgh, it was renamed Walker Valley in 1862.

== Geography ==
Walker Valley is located at 41°38′32″N 74°22′21″W (41.642235, -74.372619).

According to the United States Census Bureau, the CDP has a total area of 2.1 square miles (5.4 km^{2}), of which 2.1 square miles (5.4 km^{2}) is land and 0.48% is water.

Walker Valley is roughly where NY Route 52 begins to ascend the eastern slope of the Shawangunk Ridge. It is near the border of Sullivan County.

== Demographics ==
Historical population
Census	Pop.	Note	%±
2000	758		—
2010	853		12.5%
2020	1,269		48.8%
U.S. Decennial Census

As of the census of 2000, there were 758 people, 276 households, and 200 families residing in the CDP. The population density was 366.5 inhabitants per square mile (141.5/km^{2}). There were 314 housing units at an average density of 151.8 per square mile (58.6/km^{2}). The racial makeup of the CDP was 95.51% White, 1.98% African American, 0.40% Native American, 0.79% Asian, 0.13% from other races, and 1.19% from two or more races. Hispanic or Latino of any race were 2.24% of the population.

There were 276 households, out of which 39.1% had children under the age of 18 living with them, 59.4% were married couples living together, 8.3% had a female householder with no husband present, and 27.5% were non-families. 20.7% of all households were made up of individuals, and 7.2% had someone living alone who was 65 years of age or older. The average household size was 2.75 and the average family size was 3.19.

In the CDP, the population was spread out, with 28.9% under the age of 18, 4.4% from 18 to 24, 31.7% from 25 to 44, 25.7% from 45 to 64, and 9.4% who were 65 years of age or older. The median age was 36 years. For every 100 females, there were 111.7 males. For every 100 females age 18 and over, there were 101.1 males.

The median income for a household in the CDP was $53,906, and the median income for a family was $56,250. Males had a median income of $41,458 versus $33,542 for females. The per capita income for the CDP was $21,403. About 3.6% of families and 6.2% of the population were below the poverty line, including 5.4% of those under age 18 and none of those age 65 or over.

== Education ==
The CDP is in the Pine Bush Central School District.

== Notable person ==
- Akiva Goldsman, screenwriter - A Beautiful Mind
