= Don Hughes =

Don Hughes may refer to:

- James D. Hughes (1922–2024), known as Don, American Air Force general
- Don B. Hughes (born 1940), member of the Maryland House of Delegates
- Donal Hughes (born 1974), Irish sport broadcaster, influencer, and athlete.
