= Lehigh Valley IronPigs =

Minor League Baseball team based in Allentown, Pennsylvania

- Founded in 2008; Allentown, Pennsylvania
Team logo
Cap insignia

Minor league affiliations
- Class: Triple-A (2008–present)
- League: International League (2008–present)
- Division: East Division

Major league affiliations
- Team: Philadelphia Phillies (2008–present)

Minor league titles
- League titles (0): None
- Division titles (1): 2018
- Wild card berths (3): 2011; 2016; 2017

Team data
- Name: Lehigh Valley IronPigs (2008–present)
- Colors: Furnace blue, brick red, steel, white
- Mascots: Ferrous and FeFe
- Ballpark: Coca-Cola Park (2008–present)
- Owner(s)/ Operator(s): Joseph Finley and Craig Stein
- General manager: Kurt Landes
- Manager: Chris Adamson
- Media: MiLB.TV and WEEX AM 1230
- Website: milb.com/lehigh-valley

The Lehigh Valley IronPigs are a Minor League Baseball team of the International League (IL) and the Triple-A affiliate of the Philadelphia Phillies. They are located in Allentown, Pennsylvania, and they are named in reference to pig iron, used in the manufacturing of steel, for which the Lehigh Valley region of Pennsylvania is well known. The IronPigs play their home games at Coca-Cola Park in Allentown.

Following the 2007 season, the Ottawa Lynx relocated to Allentown as the Lehigh Valley IronPigs. In conjunction with Major League Baseball's reorganization of Minor League Baseball in 2021, the IronPigs were shifted to the Triple-A East, whose name was restored to the International League in 2022.

Since their 2008 inaugural season, the Lehigh Valley IronPigs have made four appearances in the International League Governors' Cup playoffs (2011, 2016, 2017, and 2018). In 2018, the IronPigs won their first Northern Division title with an 84–56 record, the highest winning percentage (.600) in franchise history, but the team has not yet won an International League championship.

== History ==
=== Before the IronPigs ===
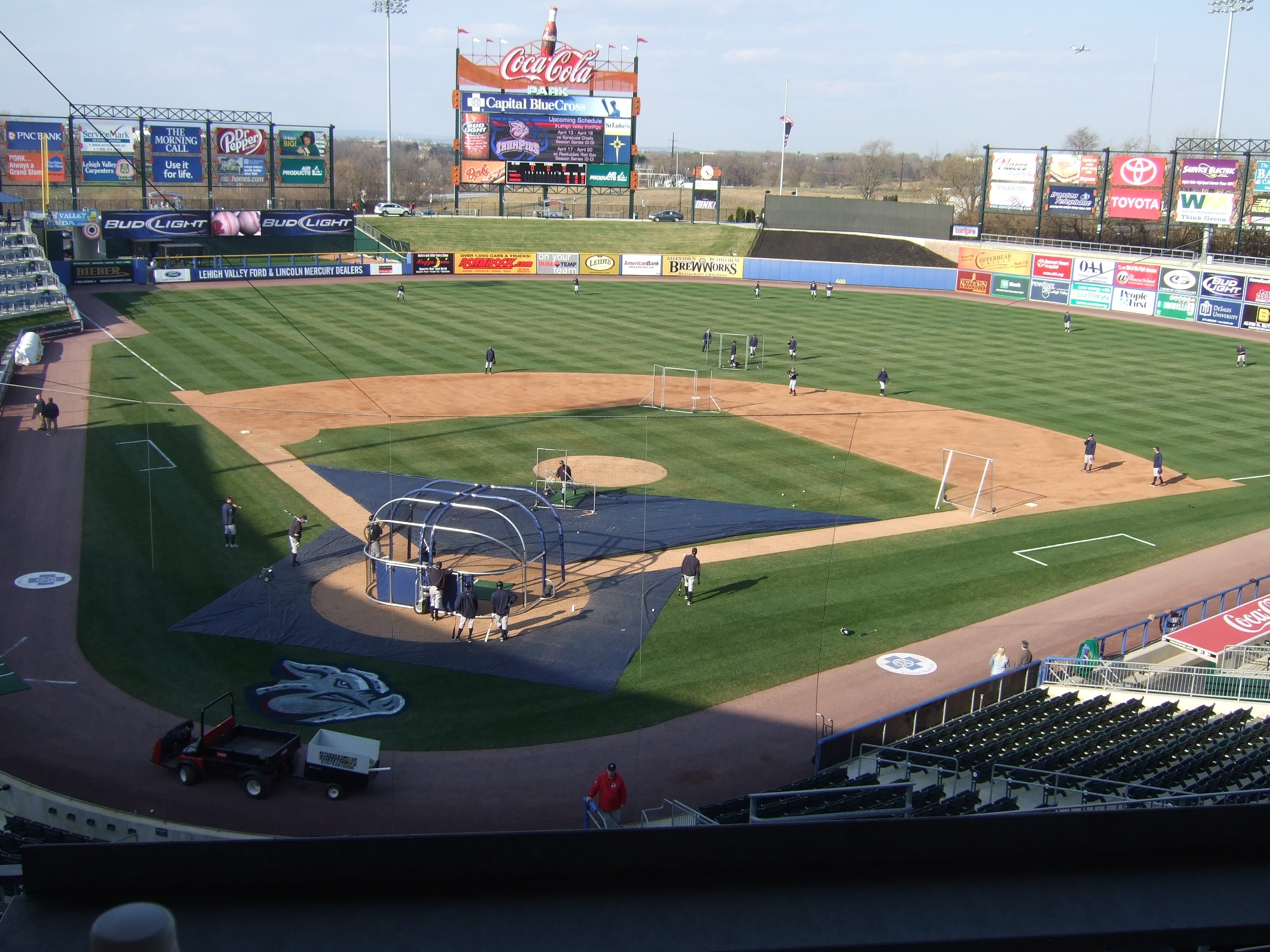
Coca-Cola Park, in Allentown, Pennsylvania, the home field of the Lehigh Valley IronPigs

Allentown, Pennsylvania, in the Lehigh Valley region of eastern Pennsylvania, has a professional baseball history dating back to 1884 with the Allentown Dukes of the original Eastern League. Though the city went through several stretches without a team, various other Minor League Baseball teams hailed from Allentown through 1960. The last of these were the Allentown Cardinals (1944–1956) and Allentown Red Sox (1958–1960). The Red Sox played at Breadon Field (later called Max Hess Stadium) at the site where the Lehigh Valley Mall was later built.

These affiliated clubs were followed by two independent baseball teams: the Allentown Ambassadors of the Northeast League and the Lehigh Valley Black Diamonds of the Atlantic League of Professional Baseball. The Ambassadors played at Bicentennial Park in Allentown until the team was disbanded after the 2003 season. The Black Diamonds moved from Newburgh, New York, in 1999 and were expected to move into a new ballpark near Easton called the Lehigh Valley Multi-Purpose Sport Complex, but the project never came to completion and ultimately was terminated. While the Black Diamonds waited for their new stadium, they played as a traveling team from 1999 to 2001.

In 2003, Joseph Finley and Craig Stein began actively pursuing their interest in bringing affiliated baseball back to Allentown. Initially, the duo pursued a Class A franchise when the Ottawa Lynx, the Triple-A affiliate of the Baltimore Orioles at the time, were rumored to be moving to Harrisburg. When the city of Harrisburg was unwilling to upgrade Commerce Bank Park to Triple-A standards, the Orioles shifted their interest to Allentown because of its proximity to the Mid-Atlantic. The Philadelphia Phillies also looked into moving their Triple-A operations to Allentown from the Scranton/Wilkes-Barre region. For the 2007 season, the Phillies shifted their Triple-A affiliate to Ottawa, leaving the Scranton/Wilkes-Barre Red Barons after 18 seasons, while the Orioles affiliated with the Norfolk Tides. The Phillies signed a one-year Player Development Contract with the Lynx while the US$50.25-million Coca-Cola Park capable of seating up to 8,100 people with a total capacity of 10,000, was being constructed in Allentown.

=== International League (2008–2020) ===
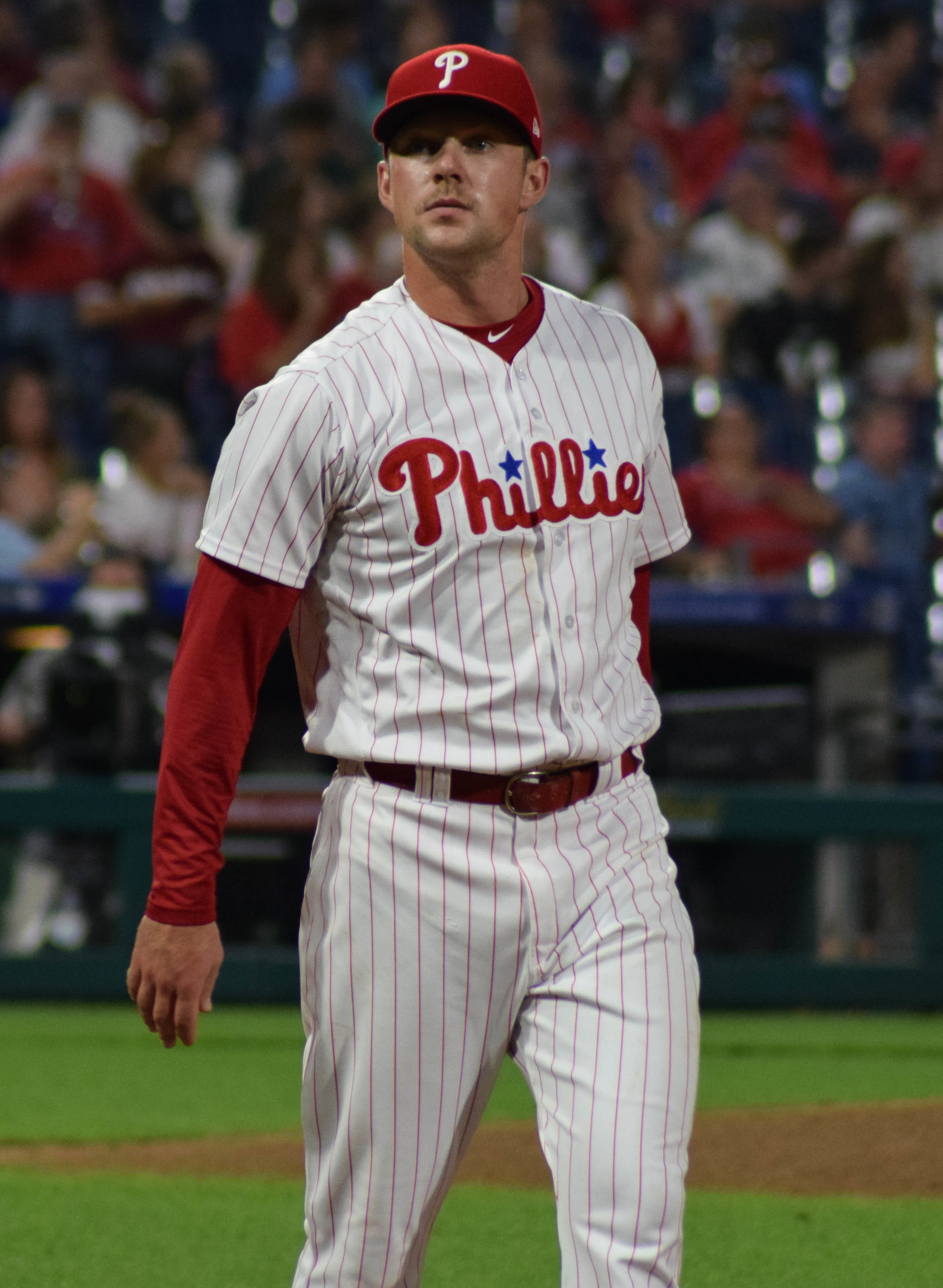
In 2017, Rhys Hoskins won both the International League MVP and International League Rookie of the Year awards while playing for the Lehigh Valley IronPigs.

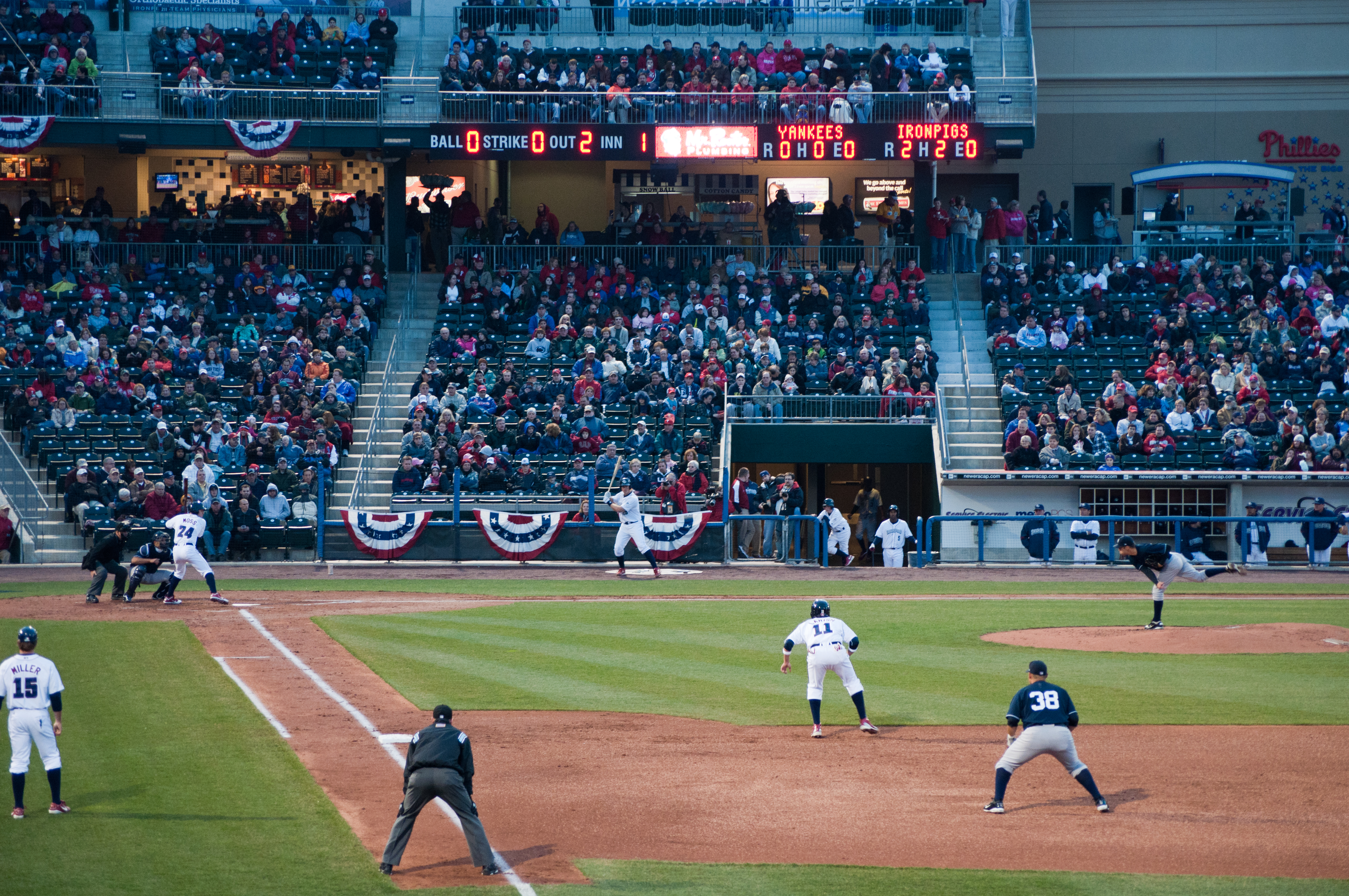
The Lehigh Valley IronPigs at Coca-Cola Park on opening day 2011

The Ottawa Lynx were relocated to Allentown in 2008 and continued as the Triple-A affiliate of the Philadelphia Phillies in the International League (IL). Known as the Lehigh Valley IronPigs, their moniker, selected in a name-the-team contest, refers to the region's steelmaking history, in particular the refining of pig iron into steel. The other finalists were "Gobblers", "Crushers", "Phillies", "Phantastics", "Vulcans", "Keystones", and "Woodchucks".

The IronPigs played their first Opening Day game on the road, losing to the Scranton/Wilkes-Barre Yankees, 4–0, on April 3, 2008. The team went on to lose their next 10 games. On April 14, Lehigh Valley broke the 11-game losing streak, defeating the Richmond Braves, 3–1, at their new home stadium, Coca-Cola Park. They ended their inaugural season last of 14 teams in the IL at 55–89. The next season, Justin Lehr became the first member of the team to win a league year-end award when he was selected as the International League's 2009 Most Valuable Pitcher. On July 14, 2010, Coca-Cola Park hosted the Triple-A All-Star Game. In the event, which was broadcast nationally on MLB Network, a team of the IL's All-Stars defeated a team of the Pacific Coast League's All-Stars, 3–1.

Baseball Hall of Fame inductee Ryne Sandberg became manager of the IronPigs in 2011. On April 7, they won their season opener against the Scranton/Wilkes-Barre Yankees at Coca-Cola Park, registering the first win–loss percentage above .500 in the team's history. Sandberg led the club to an 80–64 record which, though not good enough to win the Northern Division title, gave them a wild card berth into the Governors' Cup playoffs for the International League championship. They won the semifinals over the Pawtucket Red Sox, 3–0, but lost the championship finals to the Columbus Clippers, 3–1. Tyler Cloyd was selected as the Most Valuable Pitcher in 2012.

From 2016 to 2018, Lehigh Valley made three consecutive appearances in the Governors' Cup playoffs. The 2016 wild-card winners set a season record for wins, with 85 against 58 losses, but were swept in three games by the Scranton/Wilkes-Barre RailRiders. Jake Thompson was the circuit's Most Valuable Pitcher. The 2017 team won another wild card berth but was eliminated again by Scranton/Wilkes-Barre, 3–1. Phillies prospect Rhys Hoskins was selected as the IL's 2017 Most Valuable Player (MVP) and Rookie of the Year.

In 2018, the IronPigs won their first Northern Division title with an 84–56 record, the highest winning percentage (.600) in franchise history, but were knocked out of the semifinals for the third year in a row by the RailRiders, 3–1. Nevertheless, the IronPigs swept the International League awards with Joey Meneses as MVP and Rookie of the Year, Cole Irvin as the top pitcher, and Gary Jones as the Manager of the Year winner.

The start of the 2020 season was postponed due to the COVID-19 pandemic before being canceled on June 30. Through 13 seasons in the International League, the IronPigs had a 855–861 record. They experienced more success at the turnstiles as their season attendance topped 500,000 people each season. From 2008 to 2016, the team led Minor League Baseball with a per-game average attendance of 8,978. In 2019, franchise was recognized with the Larry MacPhail Award for outstanding minor league promotions.

=== Triple-A East / International League (2021–present) ===
Following the 2020 season, Major League Baseball assumed control of Minor League Baseball in a move to increase player salaries, modernize facility standards, and reduce travel. The Philadelphia Phillies retained Lehigh Valley as their Triple-A affiliate, but the International League disbanded, and the IronPigs followed the other IL teams into the Triple-A East. Lehigh Valley ended the season in fourth place in the Northeastern Division with a 52–66 record. No playoffs were held to determine a league champion; instead, the team with the best regular-season record was declared the winner. However, 10 games that had been postponed from the start of the season were reinserted into the schedule as a postseason tournament called the Triple-A Final Stretch in which all 30 Triple-A clubs competed for the highest winning percentage. The IronPigs finished the tournament in 30th place with a 1–9 record. In 2022, the Triple-A East became known as the International League, the name historically used by the regional circuit prior to the 2021 reorganization.

In August 2022, as Phillies' star right fielder Bryce Harper was designated to the IronPigs in a final step in his rehabilitation stint as part of his comeback from a fractured thumb, the IronPigs' games against the Gwinnett Stripers at Coca-Cola Park quickly sold out to the stadium's 10,100 capacity. In his August 23 appearance with the IronPigs, Harper homered twice against the Stripers.

In 2023, the Lehigh Valley IronPigs drew an average home attendance of 7,990 in 71 games, the highest MiLB average.

== Broadcast coverage ==
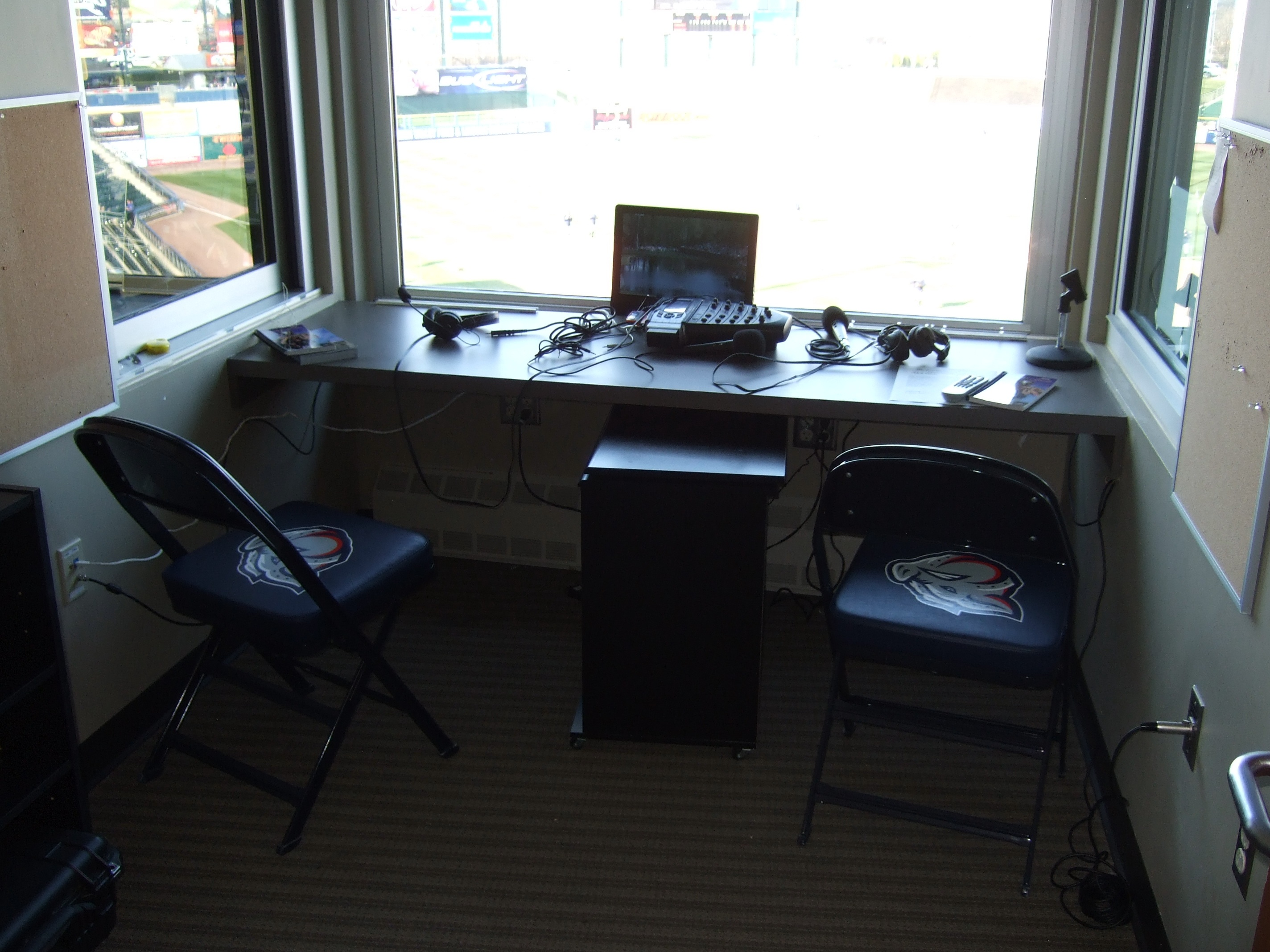
Coca-Cola Park's home radio booth in April 2009

The IronPigs franchise broadcasts all of its home games on television, a rarity for a minor league team. Local cable network SEN (The Service Electric Network) carries the IronPigs' games, covering most of the Lehigh Valley region of Pennsylvania plus parts of Warren and Hunterdon Counties in northwestern New Jersey. In addition, SEN feeds the telecasts to Blue Ridge Cable TV-13 for broadcast to other areas in the eastern part of the state. In addition, select Saturday night home games are telecast on WFMZ-TV 69, which serves the Lehigh Valley as well as the northern Philadelphia market and western New Jersey. All IronPigs games, home and away, are also broadcast on WEEX, an Easton-based FOX Sports Radio affiliate.

=== Radio ===
- WEEX/1230 (Easton)

=== Television ===
- Service Electric Network (Greater Lehigh Valley, including parts of Warren and Hunterdon counties in New Jersey)
- Service Electric Cablevision (Birdsboro, Hazleton, Mahanoy City, and Sunbury and surrounding areas.
- Blue Ridge Cable TV13 (Palmerton)
- WYLN-CD/35 (Hazleton)
  - W09DB/9: Berwick, Pennsylvania (WYLN-CD translator)
  - W36EY/36: Williamsport, Pennsylvania (WYLN-CD translator)
- WFMZ-TV/69 (Allentown)

== Mascots ==
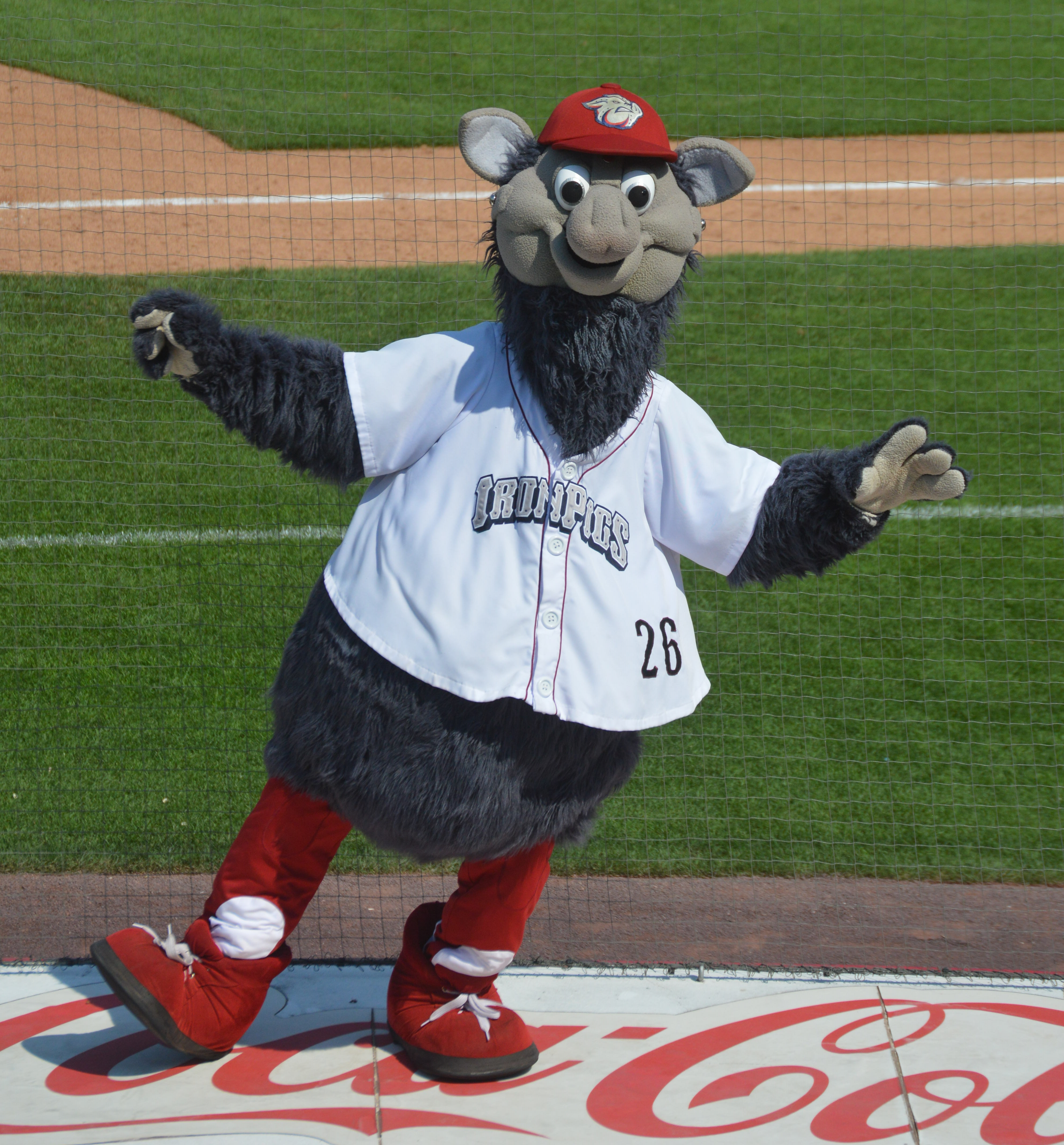
FeRROUS, one of two mascots for the Lehigh Valley IronPigs, performs during the Seventh inning stretch at Coca-Cola Park, August 2018.

The IronPigs' mascots are a pair of furry anthropomorphic pigs, similar to Mangalicas, called FeRROUS and FeFe. Their names are derived from the Latin term for iron (ferrum) and the element's chemical symbol (Fe). FeRROUS, who has gray fur and a lighter gray face, wears an IronPigs jersey with the number 26 (the atomic number for iron), a team cap, and shoes. FeFe, who is also gray but with a tan face and brunette pigtails, wears a red jersey that extends into a skirt with the number 08, which commemorates the team's first season (2008), a team cap, and shoes. The name "PorkChop" was originally chosen for FeRROUS, but it was changed the day after its selection because of complaints from local Puerto Rican residents alleging that Pork Chop was a derogatory term.

== Season-by-season records ==
Table key
League	The team's final position in the league standings
Division	The team's final position in the divisional standings
GB	Games behind the team that finished in first place in the division that season
‡	Class champions (2008–present)
†	League champions (2008–present)
*	Division champions (2008–2022)
^	Postseason berth (2008–present)

Season-by-season records (last five seasons)
Season	League	Regular-season					Postseason			MLB affiliate	Ref.
Season	League	Record	Win %	League	Division	GB	Record	Win %	Result	MLB affiliate	Ref.
2022	IL	76–72	.514	7th (tie)	4th (tie)	9	—	—	—	Philadelphia Phillies	
2023	IL	80–66	.548	6th	3rd	8 1/2	—	—	—	Philadelphia Phillies	
2024	IL	68–78	.466	14th	7th	19 1/2	—	—	—	Philadelphia Phillies	
2025	IL	87–61	.588	3rd	3rd	1	—	—	—	Philadelphia Phillies	
2026	IL	68–81	.456	15th	8th	22 1/2	—	—	—	Philadelphia Phillies	
Totals	—	379–358	.514	—	—	—	—	—	—	—	—

== Roster ==
Lehigh Valley IronPigs roster
Players		Coaches/Other
Pitchers: 41 Ryan Cusick; 12 Tucker Davidson; 45 Drake Fellows; 47 Tristan Garnett; 67 Brian Keller; 25 Chuck King; 50 Casey Lawrence; 43 Michael Mercado; 48 Mitch Neunborn; 37 Kirby Snead; 57 Lou Trivino	Catchers: 38 Jordan Dissin; 24 Paul McIntosh; Infielders: 10 Keaton Anthony; 29 Carter Kieboom; 4 Robert Moore; Outfielders: 69 Wuilfredo Antunez; 0 Steward Berroa; 3 Nick Biddison; 21 Jonathan Hogart; 28 Dylan Moore	Manager: 30 Chris Adamson; Coaches: 62 Phil Cundari (pitching); 17 Adam Lind (hitting); 35 Ray Ricker (coach); 60-day injured list: -- Kolby Allard; -- Andrew Bechtold (full season); 93 Alex Binelas; -- Connor Gillispie (full season); 18 Daniel Robert (full season); 88 Levi Stoudt (full season); -- Andrew Walling; 7-day injured list; * On Philadelphia Phillies 40-man roster; ~ Development list; # Rehab assignment; ∞ Reserve list; ‡ Restricted list; § Suspended list; † Temporarily inactive list; Roster updated October 13, 2026; Transactions; → More rosters: MiLB • International League; → Philadelphia Phillies minor league players

== Awards ==
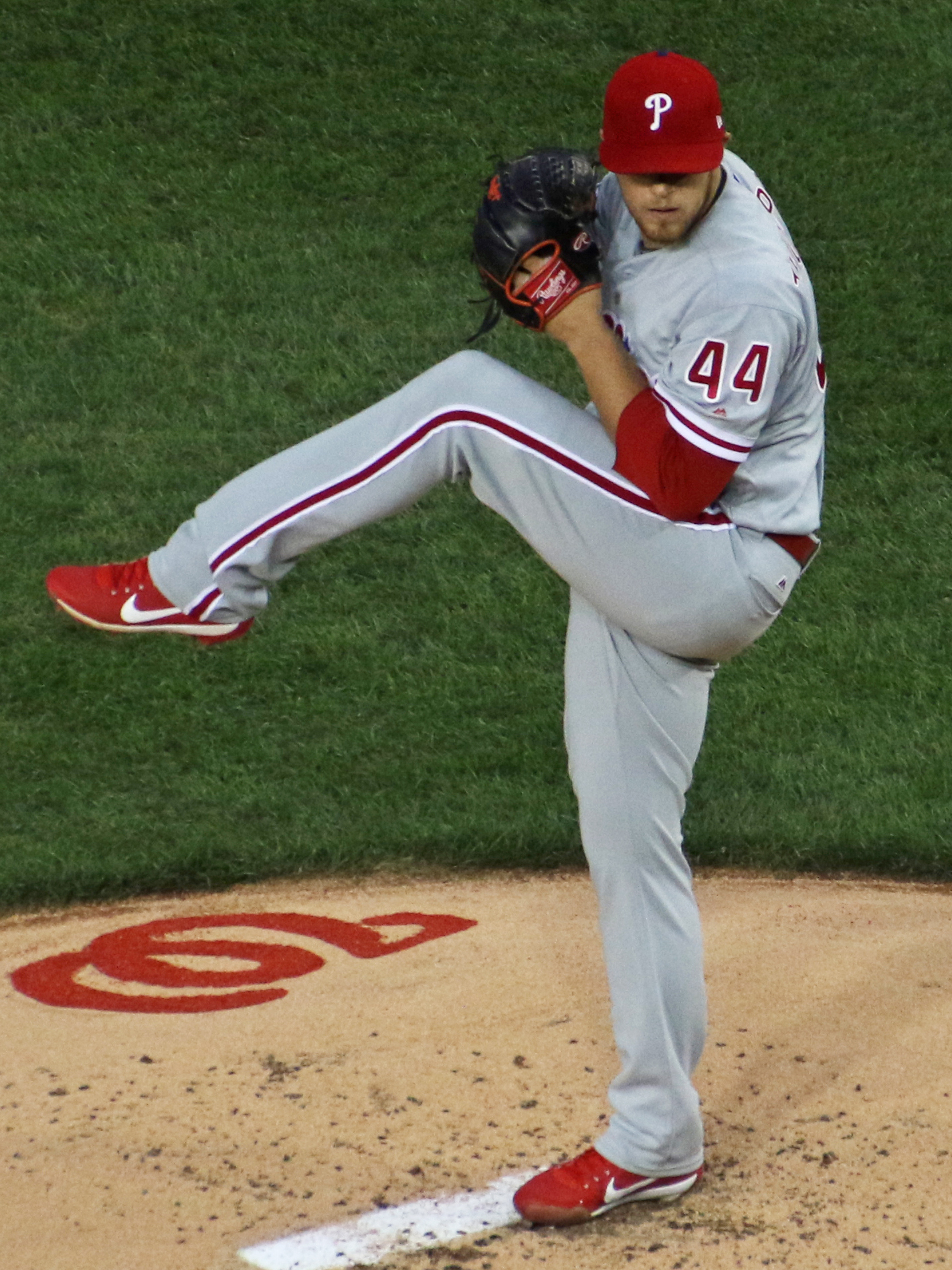
Jake Thompson, then playing with the IronPigs, won the International League Most Valuable Pitcher Award in 2016 and was also named to the 2016 post-season International League All-Star team.

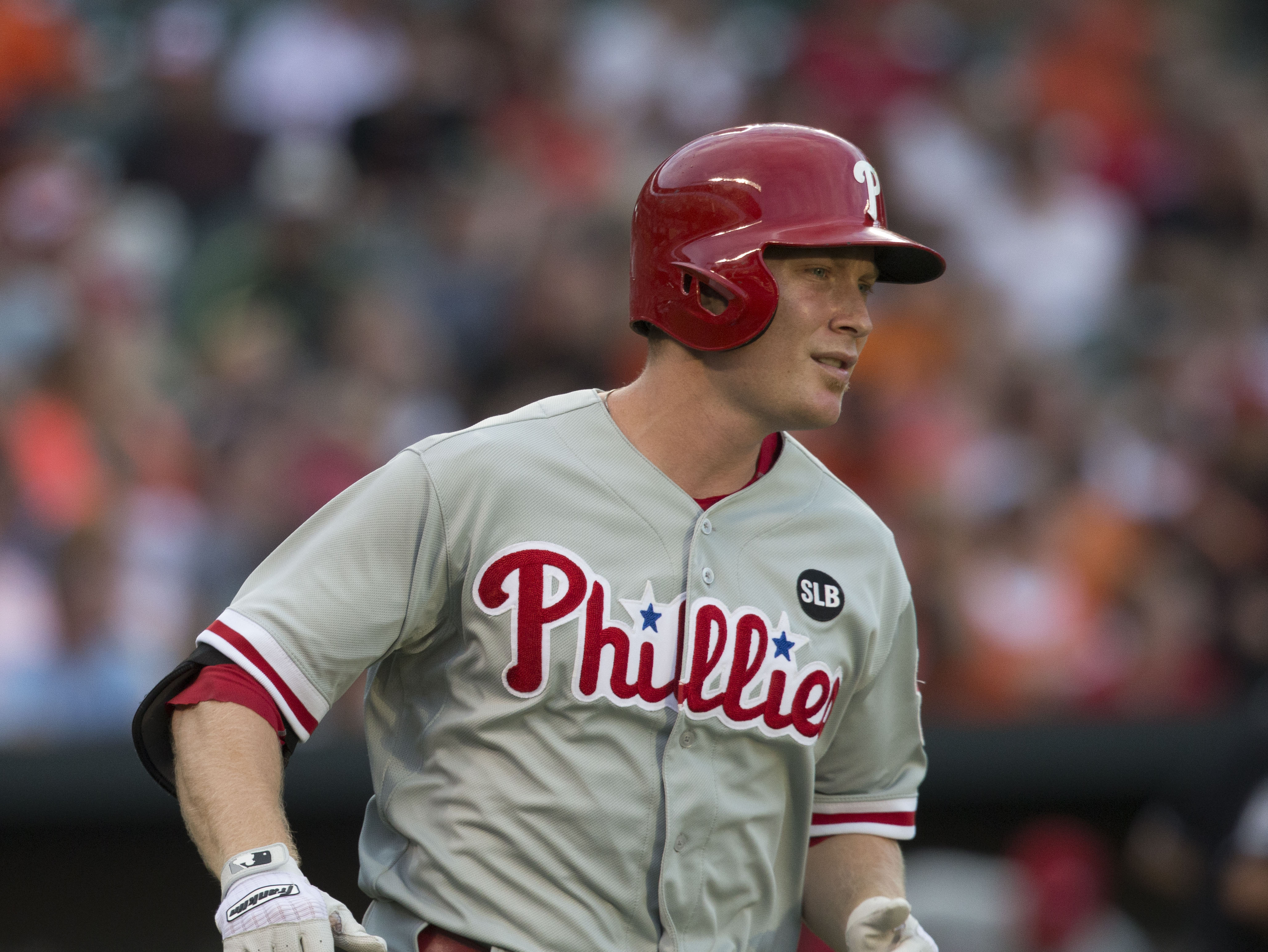
Cody Asche, then playing with the IronPigs, was selected to the 2013 International League post-season All-Star team.

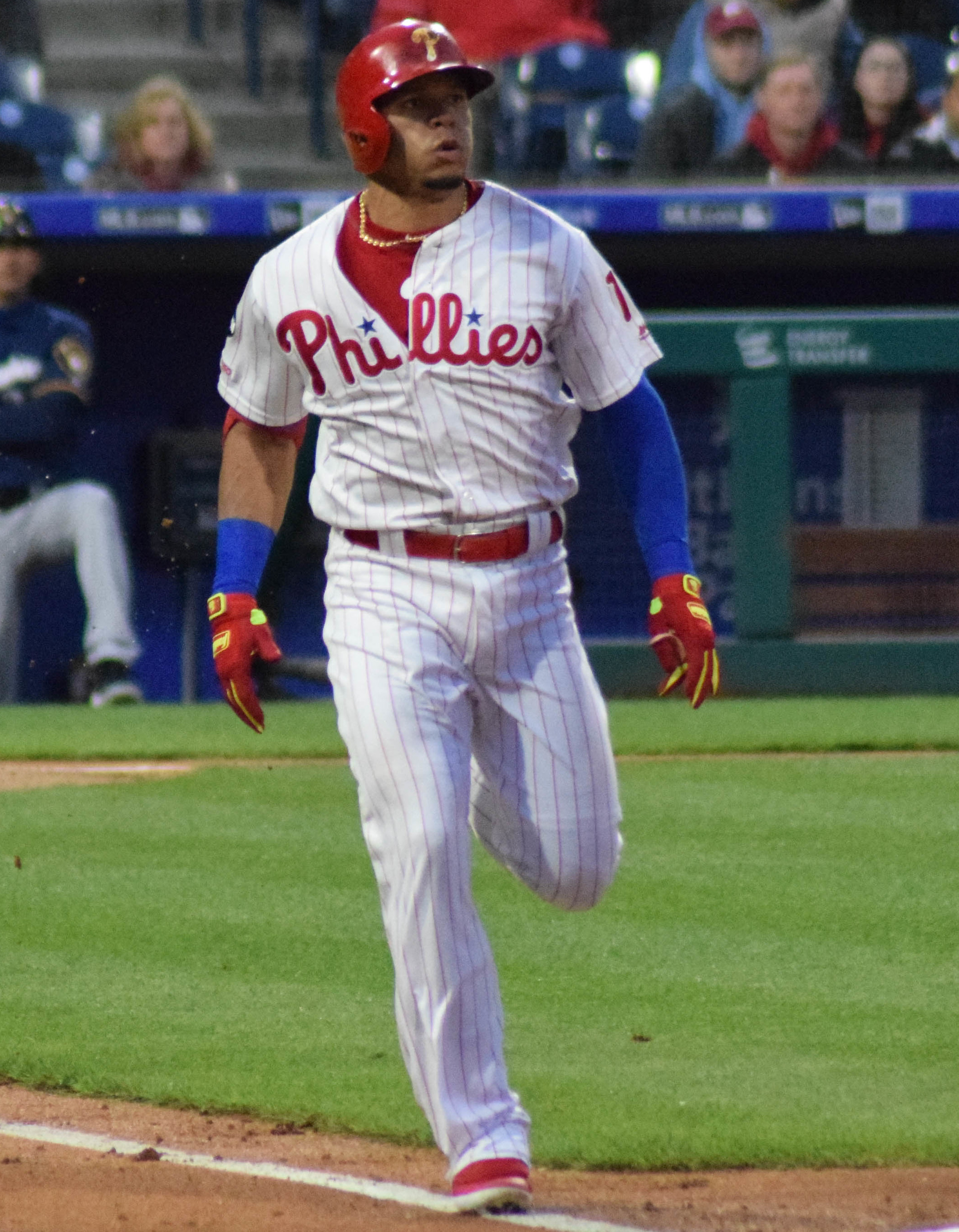
César Hernández was named to the 2013 International League post-season All-Star team while playing with the IronPigs.

The franchise has been awarded the following honors by Minor League Baseball:

Minor League Baseball Awards
Award	Season	Ref.
Larry MacPhail Award	2019	

Seven players, one manager, and one executive have won league awards in recognition for their performance with Lehigh Valley.

International League Awards
Award	Recipient	Season	Ref.
Most Valuable Player	Rhys Hoskins	2017	
Most Valuable Player	Joey Meneses	2018	
Most Valuable Pitcher	Justin Lehr	2009	
Most Valuable Pitcher	Tyler Cloyd	2012	
Most Valuable Pitcher	Jake Thompson	2016	
Most Valuable Pitcher	Cole Irvin	2018	
Pitcher of the Year	Mick Abel	2025	
Rookie of the Year	Rhys Hoskins	2017	
Rookie of the Year	Joey Meneses	2018	
Manager of the Year	Gary Jones	2018	
Executive of the Year	Kurt Landes	2009	
Executive of the Year	Kurt Landes	2010	

Sixteen IronPigs have been named to postseason all-star teams.

International League Postseason All-Stars
Season	Player	Position	Ref.
2009	Andy Tracy	Outfielder	
2012	Tyler Cloyd	Starting pitcher	
2013	Cody Asche	Third baseman	
2013	César Hernández	Second baseman	
2015	Brian Bogusevic	Outfielder	
2016	Edward Mujica	Relief pitcher	
2016	Jake Thompson	Starting pitcher	
2017	Pedro Beato	Relief pitcher	
2017	Rhys Hoskins	First baseman	
2018	Pedro Beato	Relief pitcher	
2018	Cole Irvin	Starting pitcher	
2018	Joey Meneses	First baseman	
2018	Mitch Walding	Third baseman	
2023	Weston Wilson	Shortstop	
2025	Mick Abel	Starting pitcher	
2025	Justin Crawford	Outfielder	
2025	Otto Kemp	Third baseman	

== See also ==
- Sports in Allentown, Pennsylvania
