= Michael H. Hirschberg =

American judge (1847–1929)

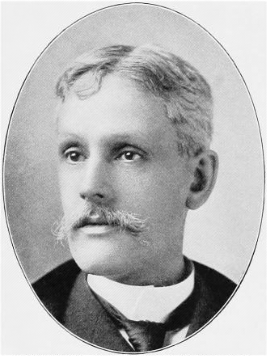
- Born: Michael Henry Hirschberg; April 12, 1847; Newburgh, New York, US
- Died: March 17, 1929 (aged 81); Balmville, New York, US
- Education: Newburgh Free Academy
- Occupations: Lawyer, judge
- Political party: Republican
- Spouse: Elizabeth McAlles (m. 1878)

Michael Henry Hirschberg (April 12, 1847 – March 17, 1929) was a Jewish-American lawyer and judge from New York.

== Life ==
Hirschberg was born on April 12, 1847, in Newburgh, New York, the son of Henry Michael Hirschberg and Frances Frank. His father was from Prussia (later part of Germany), worked as a merchant, and served as town supervisor, commissioner of excise, and president of Congregation Beth Jacob. His mother was from Newcastle-under-Lyme, England.

When Hirschberg was 10, he was sent to Cincinnati, Ohio, and spent a year at a public school there. This was followed by two years at a private institution in New York City. He then returned to Newburgh and went to the Academy there, graduating in 1862. After spending a year studying the classics under Hugh S. Banks, he worked as a dry goods salesman in Marion, Indiana, for three years. In 1866, he returned to Newburgh and began studying law in the office of Stephen W. Fullerton. He was admitted to the bar in 1868, and in 1869 he formed a partnership with David A. Scott, who recently retired as Surrogate. The firm lasted over twenty years, ending with Scott's death. He was first elected to the board of education when he was 23, and he served as president of the board for several years. A Republican, he declined nominations for Mayor and Congress.

Hirschberg served as Special County Judge of Orange County from 1876 to 1879. In 1889, he was elected District Attorney of Orange County, an office he held until 1895. He was a delegate-at-large to 1894 New York Constitutional Convention, where he helped obtain constitutional recognition of the State University of New York. In 1896, he was elected to the New York Supreme Court. In 1900, Governor Theodore Roosevelt appointed him to the Appellate Division, Second Department. In 1904, Governor Benjamin Odell appointed him Presiding Justice of that court. His term as Presiding Justice expired in 1911, at which point Governor John Alden Dix appointed Associate Justice of the court. Hirschberg retired from the Appellate Division in 1914 and from the Supreme Court in 1918, at which point he served as an official referee of the 9th Judicial District.

Hirschberg was a trustee of George Washington's Headquarters and a member of the New York State Bar Association and the Freemasons. In 1878, he married Elizabeth McAlles of Newburgh. Their children were Henry, Stuart McAlles, Mary Frances, and David Scott. Henry and Stuart were both lawyers, and Henry served as District Attorney of Orange County.

Hirschberg died at his home in Balmville, New York on March 17, 1929. He was buried in Cedar Hill Cemetery.
