= Delano-Hitch Stadium =

Stadium in Newburgh, New York, US

- The Ditch
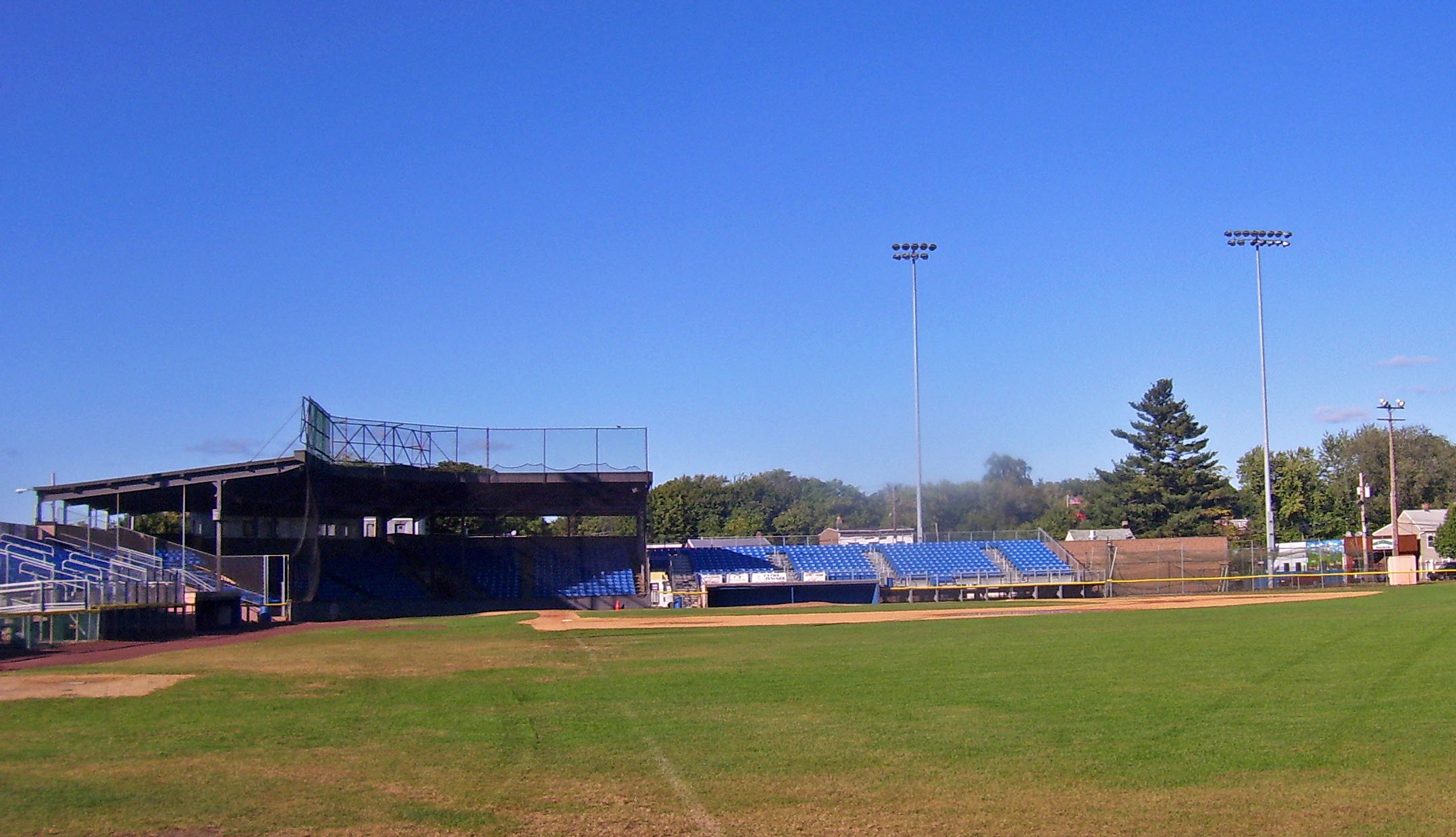
- Interactive map of Delano-Hitch Stadium
- Location: Newburgh, New York, United States
- Coordinates: 41°29′56″N 74°01′31″W
- Owner: City of Newburgh
- Capacity: 3,100
- Surface: Grass

Construction
- Built: 1926
- Opened: 1926
- Renovated: 1998

Tenants
- Newburgh Hummingbirds (NAL) 1946; Newburgh Night Hawks (NeL) 1995–1996; Newburgh Black Diamonds (ALPB) 1997; Newburgh Newts (NCBL) 2015

Delano-Hitch Stadium is a stadium in Newburgh, New York; it has a current capacity of 3,100.

== Early years ==
Baseball in Newburgh goes back to the 1860s: the Hudson River club played from 1863 to 1867, compiling an 18–18 record against many of the top teams of the day. Several other short-lived pro teams called the city home before World War I, including the Newburgh Taylor-Mades (a.k.a. Hill Climbers or Hillies, Hudson River League, 1903–1907); the Newburgh Dutchmen (New York-New Jersey League, 1913) and the Newburgh Hillclimbers (Atlantic League, 1914).

In 1916, Mrs. Annie Delano Hitch (aunt of Franklin Delano Roosevelt) donated land to the City of Newburgh for a "driving park", later known as Delano-Hitch Recreation Park. The stadium was opened in 1926, and has been primarily used for baseball. Four professional teams have called Delano-Hitch home: the Newburgh Hummingbirds in 1946, the Newburgh Nighthawks in 1995–96, the Newburgh Black Diamonds in 1998, and the Newburgh Newts briefly in 2015.

== Later use ==
During the next half-century, the stadium was used by various amateur and semi-pro baseball teams (including the Hudson Valley Rookie League's Newburgh Mets in mid-1980s) and Pop Warner football from 1960s till the 1980s. The semi-pro football Newburgh Raiders called Delano-Hitch home from 1991 to 1996, winning four Empire Football League championships; despite their success, the EFL unanimously voted to boot Newburgh out in 1997 for a variety of reasons, including the fact that Delano-Hitch wasn't really suitable for football.

== 1995–96 Newburgh Nighthawks ==
In 1995, owner Bill Cummings brought the Newburgh Nighthawks to town, as a franchise in the new Northeast League (now the Can-Am League). Despite decent attendance figures of about 1,000 per game, Cummings lost over $30,000 and sold the team to Jeff Kunion. The 1996 Nighthawks won the NEL first half championship and played the Albany-Colonie Diamond Dogs for the league title, losing three games to one. The final game of the championship series proved to be the last Nighthawks' game ever, as Kunion, unsatisfied with the pace of stadium renovations, folded the team.

== 1998 Newburgh Black Diamonds ==
After sitting empty in 1997, the stadium got a new team for 1998: the Atlantic League's Newburgh Black Diamonds. However, poor attendance and the league's displeasure with Delano-Hitch's condition sealed Newburgh's fate, despite $150,000 worth of renovations. Minutes before Newburgh's home opener, league president Bud Harrelson announced the Black Diamonds would return in 1999, but only if the team built a new stadium. Instead, the franchise was sent wandering for several years after a proposed stadium in Easton, Pennsylvania was left unfinished after the builders went bankrupt; the team existed as the Road Warriors through 2004, then again in 2006–07.

== 21st century ==
Recently, Delano-Hitch has been used for amateur baseball, including high school (Newburgh Free Academy), college (Mount Saint Mary College), collegiate league (New York Generals) and American Legion ball. The financial downturn, however, has made it difficult for these teams to afford the rent on the stadium; since 2009, the ballpark has mostly sat empty, except for non-athletic gatherings. On August 7, 2010, Marcus Gill Ministries held a crusade, "Unity Fest with Minister Marcus Gill". About 150 people attended the crusade, held to encourage the community to pray for peace and to end crime in Newburgh.

In 2011, the Newburgh Nuclears American Legion team returned to Delano-Hitch for a series of home games and tournaments, after raising $13,000 for the use of the facility.

== Newburgh Newts ==
In 2015, Delano-Hitch was briefly the home of the Newburgh Newts of the North Country Baseball League. One of the new league's founding franchises, the Newts' first home game was played May 20 against the Watertown Bucks, kicking off a planned 66-game schedule that was to run through early August. After a series of tiny crowds of around twenty customers per game, the Newts were evicted from Delano-Hitch after three weeks, when their rent check bounced. The franchise continued to operate as a road team (apparently renamed the New York Newts, according to the league website), one of two in the four-team circuit. Despite a slow start and being forced to play all of their contests on the road, the Newts finished 22–17, good enough for a first-place tie with the league's other road team, the Road City Explorers.

In early August, the Newts won the NCBL championship, sweeping Watertown in a two-game series. The Newts apparently folded after that, as they were not invited to join the four-team Empire Professional Baseball League in 2016.
