= Mickey Scott =

German baseball player (1947–2011)

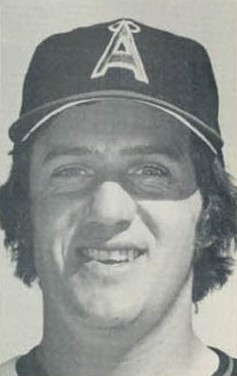
- Scott with the California Angels
- Relief pitcher
- Born: July 25, 1947; Weimar, Soviet occupation zone
- Died: October 30, 2011 (aged 64); Binghamton, New York, U.S.
- Batted: Left Threw: Left

MLB debut
- May 6, 1972, for the Baltimore Orioles

Last MLB appearance
- June 6, 1977, for the California Angels

MLB statistics
- Win–loss record: 8–7
- Earned run average: 3.72
- Strikeouts: 70
- Stats at Baseball Reference

Teams
- Baltimore Orioles (1972–1973); Montreal Expos (1973); California Angels (1975–1977)

Ralph Robert Scott (July 25, 1947 – October 30, 2011) was a left-handed specialist pitcher in North American Major League Baseball (MLB) who played in portions of five seasons with the Baltimore Orioles, Montreal Expos and California Angels from 1972 to 1977. He was born in Weimar, Soviet occupation zone of Germany.

== Career ==
Scott was selected out of Newburgh Free Academy by the New York Yankees in the 17th round (328th overall) of the 1965 Major League Baseball draft. He was the first high school baseball player drafted out of the Mid-Hudson region of the Hudson Valley by any MLB club. He was traded to the Chicago White Sox for Pete Ward on December 18, 1969.

He also spent nine seasons in the Minor leagues, mostly for the Rochester Red Wings of the International League. In 1971, he collected a 9–1 record with nine saves and a 3.38 earned run average in 54 games for manager Joe Altobelli's pennant-winning and Governors' Cup winning-team. He had an even better season for Rochester in 1974, when he was 8–2 with 17 saves and a 0.99 ERA in 57 games.

In his nine-year minors career, he posted a 60–32 record with 46 saves and a 3.20 ERA in 297 pitching appearances.

He was elected to the Red Wings Hall of Fame in 1998, along with Allie Clark, Frank Horton and Al Weber.

He spent a year in the United States Army in 1967 where he played baseball at Fort Leonard Wood, Missouri.

== Personal life ==
Scott met his eventual wife, Linda Brown, while he was playing for the Binghamton Triplets and she was a sophomore at Ithaca College. They had a son, Kevin, in 1970. After Kevin began school, Scott stopped playing winter baseball in Latin America and began spending offseasons with his family in Binghamton, New York.

Scott died in Binghamton in 2011 at the age of 64.
