= Newburgh Night Hawks =

Information
- Location: Newburgh, New York
- Ballpark: Delano-Hitch Stadium
- Founded: 1995
- Disbanded: 1996
- League championships: None
- Former name: Newburgh Night Hawks
- Former league: Northeast League (1995–96)
- Colors: Black, light blue, gray, white
- Ownership: Jeff Kunion
- General manager: Russ Ardolina
- Manager: Dan Shwam

The Newburgh Night Hawks were a minor league baseball team based in Newburgh, New York. The team played in the Northeast League, a professional independent baseball league, and as such none of its teams had an affiliation with Major League Baseball. The team existed from 1995 to 1996 and played its home games at Delano-Hitch Stadium in Newburgh.

== History ==
The Night Hawks were one of the six original Northeast League franchises in 1995. In that first season all six teams were located in the state of New York. The Night Hawks finished the first season in fourth place with a 28–41 record, 23 1/2 games out of first place. The Night Hawks were one of only three teams that would return for a second season. Although the team brought in about 1,000 fans per game, team owner Bill Cummings sold the team leaving $30,000 in debt.

The Night Hawks had a fairly successful season in the following year, they won the first half of the league season and finished with a 55–25 record. They lost the league championship to the Albany-Colonie Diamond Dogs three games to one. The team would feature former big leaguers, Joel Bennett and Ken Dixon They averaged better than 1,000 fans per game. At the end of the 1996 season, new team owner Jeff Kunion, unhappy with the progress of plans to improve aging Delano-Hitch Stadium, decided to fold the team. The team was replaced by the Waterbury Spirit for the 1997 season.
