= Lehigh Valley Multi-Purpose Sport Complex =

Demolished Stadium in Williams Township, Pennsylvania

- Location within Pennsylvania Location within the United States
- Interactive map of Lehigh Valley Multi-Purpose Sport Complex
- Location: Williams Township, Pennsylvania
- Coordinates: 40°40′23″N 75°12′2″W
- Operator: Thomas X. Flaherty
- Surface: Natural grass (planned)

Construction
- Groundbreaking: 1998
- Opened: never
- Demolished: 2005
- Cost: $15 million (projected)

Tenant
- none

The Lehigh Valley Multi-Purpose Sport Complex (also known as Williams Township Ballpark) was a partially built, 6,400-seat stadium that was slated to be built in Williams Township, Pennsylvania, near Easton. The stadium was never completed, and the partially constructed building was demolished in 2005.

== History ==
The idea for the stadium was originally devised by Paoli, Pennsylvania, businessman Thomas X. Flaherty. Plans were for the new stadium to host the Lehigh Valley Black Diamonds of the independent Atlantic League of Professional Baseball, as well as the Lehigh Valley Steam A-League soccer club. The stadium's total cost would have been $15 million. The land the stadium was to be built on was owned by a Pennsylvania non-profit organization, Northwestern Human Services (NHS), on whose board of trustees Flaherty sat. The non-profit qualified for a $5 million grant from the Commonwealth of Pennsylvania; NHS hoped that its involvement in the stadium would raise its profile in the community and create awareness for its programs.

The Black Diamonds were intended to open their inaugural 1998 season in the new park. However, construction was delayed and did not commence until December 1998. Plans were changed for play at the stadium to start in the 2000 season. In the meantime, the construction delay caused the Steam to fold, after playing its sole season in 1999 on various high school fields in the area.

In 1998, the Black Diamonds played their home games at aging Delano-Hitch Stadium in Newburgh, New York as the Newburgh Black Diamonds. League commissioner Bud Harrelson announced that the league would return to Newburgh in 1999 only if the city built a new stadium; they did not, forcing the club played its entire second season as a traveling team.

In July 1999, with the stadium only about 60% completed, construction was halted when funds were exhausted and permanent financing could not be located. Further, the $5 million grant that was promised by the Commonwealth of Pennsylvania upon completion of the facility was officially terminated.

While attempting to find investors to complete construction of the stadium, the Black Diamonds moved into cozy Memorial Park Stadium in Quakertown, Pennsylvania, which had a capacity of about 900, all on wooden benches. Since the new team arrived at the last minute, Memorial Park gave the Quakertown Blazers of the Atlantic Collegiate Baseball League, as well as the local American Legion teams, schedule priority over the Black Diamonds. Therefore, home games were often played on weekday afternoons and typically drew less than 100 fans; one game had a paid attendance of exactly two people. The club filed for bankruptcy in 2000, and their place in the league was taken by another traveling team, the Pennsylvania Road Warriors.

Finally, the Sport Complex was torn down in 2005, without a single game ever being played at its grounds.

=== Legacy ===
Several lawsuits followed in the wake of the Sports Complex failure, including one brought by Northwestern Human Services itself, against Flaherty and its former president and CEO, Robert C. Panaccio. The suit claimed that Flaherty and Panaccio used their positions on the board of trustees to influence NHS into gifting the land for the construction of the Sports Complex; it was also alleged that the two hid the fact that Flaherty had no independent ability to pay for the stadium, and that they had secretly been using NHS funds to pay for the construction of the stadium even though they made representations to the other board members that no funds were being used. As proof of its claims, NHS produced documentation that Flaherty and Panaccio entered into an agreement for the company to purchase a building owned by Flaherty at an inflated price of nearly $900,000 more than he paid for it four years earlier. The proceeds from the sale were to be used in the construction of the Sports Complex.

The idea of professional baseball in the Lehigh Valley seemed to be seriously damaged by the failure of the Sport Complex and the Black Diamonds. However, in 2006 ground was broken on Coca-Cola Park, a $50.25 million facility with a capacity of 10,000 people, located in Allentown. The stadium is used by the Lehigh Valley IronPigs, who are the Triple-A affiliate of the Philadelphia Phillies, who have been a success.
