= Powelton Club =

Sports venue in Balmville, New York

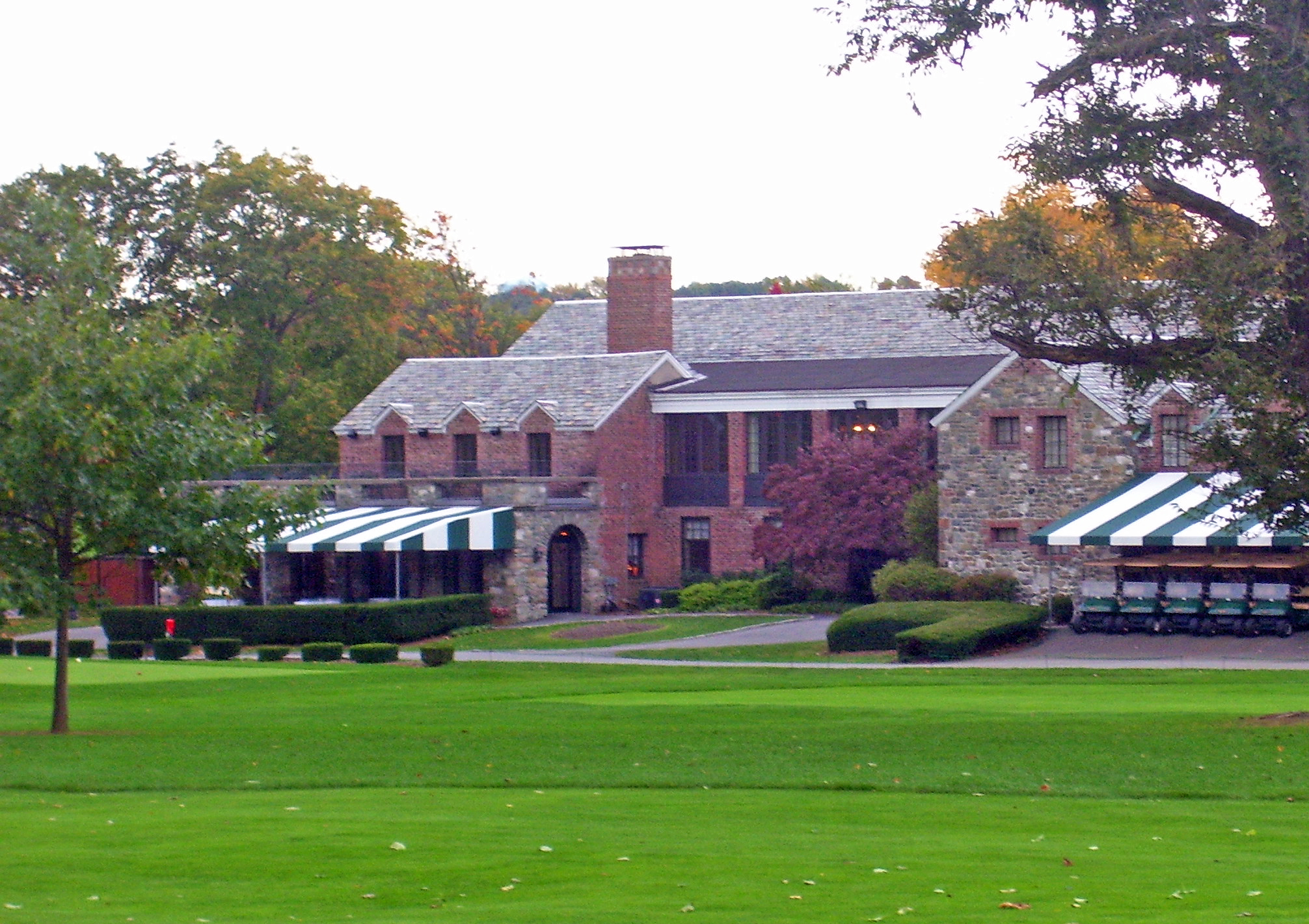
- Interactive map of Powelton Club
- 41°31′28″N 74°00′57″W

Club information
- Location: Balmville, NY, United States
- Established: 1882
- Type: private
- Total holes: 18
- Website: http://www.powelton.com/
- Designed by: Devereux Emmet
- Par: 70
- Length: 6,007 yards (5,493 m)
- Course rating: 69.3
- Course record
- Powelton Club
- U.S. National Register of Historic Places
- Location within New York
- Location: 2963 Balmville Rd., Balmville, New York
- Area: 103.5 acres (41.9 ha)
- Built: 1882
- Architectural style: Late 19th And Early 20th Century American Movements
- NRHP reference No.: 99001488
- Added to NRHP: December 20, 1999

Powelton Club is located between US 9W, Interstate 84, Balmville Road and Chestnut Lane in the hamlet of Balmville, New York, United States, just north of the city of Newburgh, in the Town of Newburgh. Originally established as an archery club, it is one of the five oldest golf courses in the state, and the ten oldest in the U.S. It has been listed on the National Register of Historic Places since 1999.

== History ==
The property had first been known as Powelton Farm, then Powelton House, after a resort hotel built on it that burned down in 1870. Organized recreational activity, a new development in the Gilded Age, began with the informal establishment of the Powelton Archery Club in 1878. The next year, tennis courts that exist today were built, and the Powelton Lawn Tennis Club of Newburgh was incorporated in 1882, one of the first tennis programs in the U.S. and one of the original 33 recognized by the United States Lawn Tennis Association when it was established later that same year.

Ten years later the organization signed a five-year lease on 1.7 acres (6,800 m^{2}) of land surrounding a newly built clubhouse. Baseball, bowling and croquet facilities were added, and club lore has it that the first five golf holes came almost immediately thereafter, only four years after the first American course was built in Yonkers. It is not known who designed them.

In 1897, additional land purchases allowed for a full nine, designed by James Taylor, a member. A 1903 map of Balmville, a leafy suburban hamlet along the Hudson River where wealthy Newburgh businessmen had built large homes in fashionable architectural styles, showed the club taking up 57 acres (23 ha).

After World War I, the club decided to increase the course to a full 18 holes, and contracted Devereux Emmet, one of the most prolific course designers in the New York metropolitan area, to design a new course in 1921. Two years later, after the club had obtained additional land he said he needed, he began his work and the new course opened in 1926, introducing sand traps, trees (including the catalpas still along Balmville Road) to delineate and shelter the fairways, and fairway grasses meant for golf rather than grazing for the first time at Powelton. The course's topography was also reworked to make it more challenging than the original pastures had been. Its original glory was short-lived as the state announced the next year it would be taking the western portion of the club property to build a new highway, US 9W. Emmet hastily redesigned three holes to accommodate the new layout.

A swimming pool was added to the property at the same time, north of the clubhouse, which burned down in 1929. The current whitewashed brick clubhouse was designed by Francis L. Abreu and opened by the next summer. Other than renovations to the tennis courts which resurfaced them in clay and added another in the 1950s, the property remained unchanged until the 1960s, when the state Department of Transportation once again took a portion off the south end to complete Interstate 84 to the nearby Newburgh-Beacon Bridge. The club negotiated to keep more land this time, thus saving the course from another major alteration. This reduced the club property to its present size of 100 acres (40 ha).

Some renovations were made to the clubhouse, including a small addition in a similar style, around that time, and a wading pool. Thirty years later, a two-story addition was made to the north corner of the building, to create a meeting room and lounge. The groundskeeper's building and a nearby barn, both dating to 1865, are the only ones still standing of several original Powelton Farm buildings on the property (other than a foundation, the others were all razed during the construction of Route 9W). All these buildings, sites and structures except the wading pool are considered contributing properties to the historic value of the club.

== See also ==
- National Register of Historic Places listings in Orange County, New York
