= Balmville Tree =

- Bloomer-Dailey House and Balmville Tree
- U.S. National Register of Historic Places
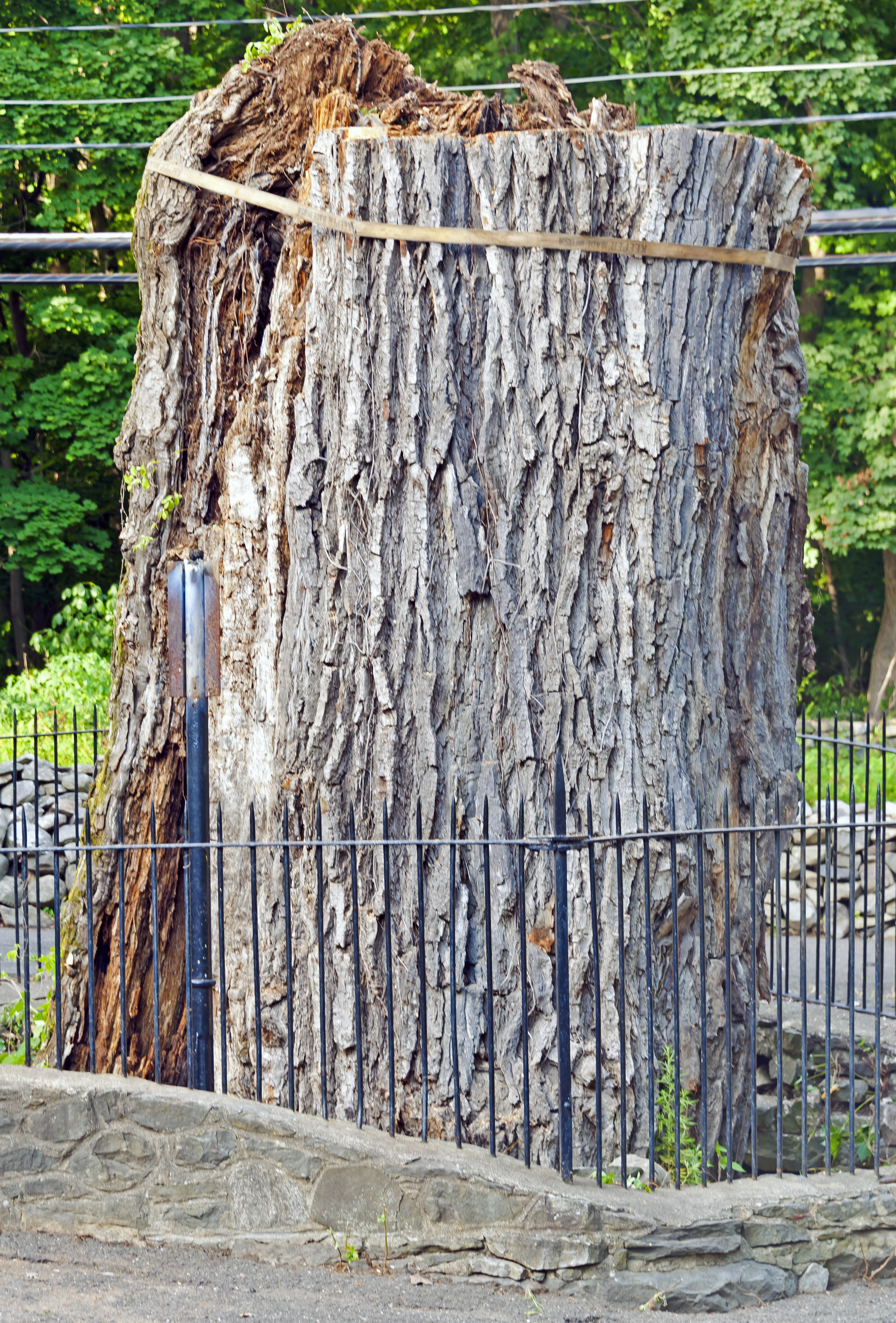
- Stump of the tree in 2015

- Location within New York Location within the United States
- Location: 83 Balmville Rd, Balmville, New York
- Coordinates: 41°31′57″N 74°0′43″W
- Area: 2 acres (0.81 ha)
- Built: 1750
- Architectural style: Colonial, Colonial Revival
- NRHP reference No.: 00001420
- Added to NRHP: December 7, 2000

The Balmville Tree was an old-growth eastern cottonwood growing at the intersection of River Road, Balmville Road and Commonwealth Avenue in Balmville, New York, a hamlet within the Town of Newburgh. It was the oldest tree of that species in the Eastern United States.

It was thought at first to be a Balm-of-Gilead tree, and lent that name to the surrounding community. By the late 20th century its size had led to consideration of its removal as a potential traffic hazard. The community rallied around efforts to save it, which led to its listing on the National Register of Historic Places in 2000 along with a neighboring house. The state took ownership of the land, making it New York's smallest state forest. However, the tree kept suffering structural problems, and it was finally cut down in 2015.

== History ==
Local folklore has it that the tree grew when George Washington planted his walking stick while he and the Continental Army were encamped in nearby Newburgh during the final years of the Revolutionary War, but core samples of the tree have dated its growth to 1699, well before American independence. Andrew Jackson Downing, Frederic Delano, and Franklin Roosevelt were among the tree's admirers.

In the mid-20th century, it began to suffer the effects of its advanced age and vandalism. In the mid-1970s arborists recommended it be removed as a traffic hazard. However, community groups led by Richard Severo, whose house overlooked the tree, were able to save it, citing its historic value.

It has thus received considerable protection from the state and federal governments. An elaborate guy-wire system and adjacent metal pole help support it, and it and the small patch of land on which it grew are protected, both by the New York State Office of Parks, Recreation and Historic Preservation as a historic site and by the New York State Department of Environmental Conservation as a "public historic park" or state forest, making it New York's smallest at 348 square feet (31 m^{2}) in area. It has been listed on the National Register of Historic Places since 2000.

On March 27, 2009, a group of environmentally minded members of the community gathered around the tree as cherry pickers cut its branches, and gardeners from the Garden Club of Orange and Dutchess Counties and other nature organizations took buds to bring home and nurse in pots until large enough to plant in the ground. Any buds that flourish will be distributed to historically significant sites throughout the Mid Hudson Valley. As the headline of the next edition of The Sentinel proclaimed, "Balmville Tree's Longevity Could be Passed on to Descendents".

The only people to have successfully propagated a cutting from the Balmville Tree are Richard and Emoke Severo, who live next door to the tree. Of the four attempts the Severos made, after taking cuttings in 1999, the tricentennial of the Balmville Tree, only one survived which they credit to the cutting sharing the same water and soil as the original tree.

On August 5, 2015 the tree was cut down and removed by the New York State Department of Environmental Protection, which cited safety concerns. For several weeks prior to the removal, the surrounding roads were closed to traffic due to the rapid deterioration of the tree, including the danger of falling limbs. Residents did not protest, but nevertheless lamented the tree's end. "There is no Balmville without the Balmville Tree," one told a local newspaper.

A 15-foot-tall (4.6 m) stump remains. It is still a protected area; residents are planning to rededicate it. Many also took cuttings and will plant them in the hope of carrying on the tree genetically.

== Measurements ==
At the time of its removal it was 25 feet (7.6 m) in circumference at its base, and 83 feet (25 m) high. It once reached as high as 110 feet (33. 5 m), but its crown had to be trimmed after extensive damage from Hurricane Floyd in 1999.

== See also ==
- List of individual trees
- National Register of Historic Places in Orange County, New York
