= Newburgh Free Academy =

Coordinates: 41.5089°N 74.0274°W

- NFA
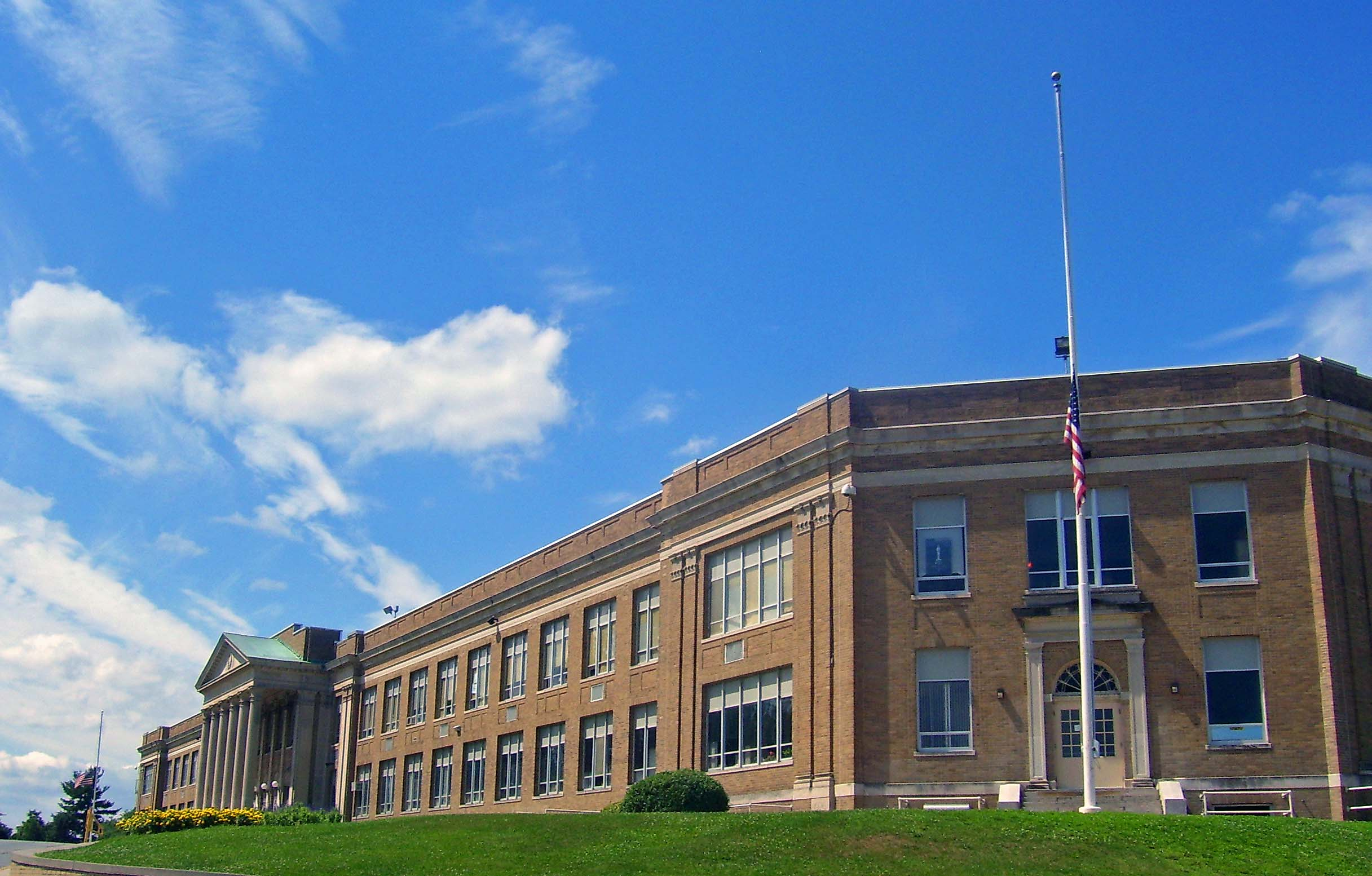
- School viewed from northeast corner, 2007

Location
- 201 Fullerton Ave. Newburgh, NY; United States

Information
- Type: Public
- Established: 1799
- School district: Newburgh Enlarged City School District
- Principal: Susan Valentino
- Staff: 24
- Faculty: 189
- Colors: Blue and gold
- Song: "Yellow and the Blue"
- Mascot: Goldback (eagle)
- Nickname: Goldbacks
- Rivals: Monroe-Woodbury High School
- Website: Newburgh Free Academy

Newburgh Free Academy (NFA) is the public high school educating all students in grades 9–12 in the Newburgh Enlarged City School District, which serves the city of Newburgh, New York, most of each of the towns of Newburgh and New Windsor, and portions of the towns of Cornwall and Wallkill.

In addition to Newburgh, the enlarged city school district includes the following census-designated places: Balmville, Gardnertown, and Vails Gate, as well as most of the New Windsor CDP and portions of the Orange Lake CDP.

It traces its history back over two centuries, to the years prior to mandatory public education.

== History ==
=== Early school ===
The school traces its history back to the early days of the United States. The Rev. George H. Spierin proposed to open an "Academy" in Newburgh. Work began in 1796 under the direction of the trustees of the glebe. (A glebe was land originally set aside in the early 18th century for a pastor and his church. The glebe for the Newburgh area was issued in 1719.) A portion of the first Academy was occupied in 1797. The building was 60 feet (18 m) by 40 feet (18.5 × 12.3m), two stories high, built of wood, and lined with brick. It was located on Liberty Street and cost around $2,500. The building was not finished until some years later when a court room was included. The building itself saw use as not only a school and court, but was also site for town meetings and political organizations.

The first record of a teacher employed was in 1799 when Samuel Nicholson was hired. The academy had only one teacher during its first eight years of existence. In 1807 management of the school passed from the hands of the trustees of the Glebe to a regularly incorporated Board of Trustees. At that time rates for tuition were adopted. The charge per quarter was $2.50. This was for the study of writing and arithmetic. A scholar studying Greek, Latin or French was charged $5.00 per quarter.

In 1807 Richard A. Thompson was employed as principal. He lived in the school rent free and was paid $100 at the end of the year. He also received all money arising from the tuition of scholars attending the academy. A Female Department was established at the academy in 1809. Reading, writing, sewing, and drawing were taught. On April 6, 1852, the New York State Legislature authorized the establishment and organization of free schools in Newburgh. Within a month free education was introduced into what was then the village of Newburgh. The academy then came under the control of Board of Education as the senior department of the Newburgh Public Schools. In 1871 a three-year course of study was arranged, at the completion of which students were required to take a written examination. Those who passed the examination were granted diplomas as graduates. The first Commencement Exercises were held on April 28, 1871, and included the participation of a Salutatorian and Valedictorian.

=== Second Montgomery Street Academy ===
Ten years after the first official Commencement Exercises the academy had outgrown itself. A "new" Academy was built on the grounds of the formal school on Montgomery Street in 1886 for around $70,000. Designed by Ehrick Rossiter and partner Frank A. Wright, a former student, the school had three stories and a basement. The three floors contained twelve school rooms, a large assembly room that could fit six to seven hundred people, a drawing room, a laboratory, an annex, and janitor's quarters. Each school room contained desks for 45 students, and was equipped with countersunk ink wells, black boards, closets, and electric bells. It had a brick frontage of 112 feet and a depth of 68 feet, each classroom 33 1/2 x 23 feet. Light was designed to enter over the student's left shoulders to help them when writing. The stairwells were also noted as being broad.

September 2, 1886, 201 students registered for classes at the "new" Academy, which now housed grammar and academic classes. Actual classes began on September 20. It was also during 1886 that "the free book system" was adopted by the Board. Three years later on July 7, 1889, the Board received a certificate of admission of the academy to the University of the State of New York. Soon afterwards a definite standard was set up for graduation, and the high school course was extended to four years. In September of that year the department plan of teaching, that is assigning teachers to subjects rather than to grades, was adopted. Three courses of study were established: English, Scientific, Latin-Scientific, and Classical. It was also in 1886 that corporal punishment was abolished. A superintendent's report says that "the unlimited use of the rod is certainly not desirable." Six years after moving into its "new" Montgomery Street building the academy adopted its school colors: navy blue and gold.

=== Fullerton Avenue ===
Compulsory education laws such as those of 1894, and increasing population in the city resulted in an enlarged high school enrollment. The need for a larger and more modern building was becoming increasingly evident as our school and country entered the 20th century. In 1926 construction began on a 7-acre (28,000 m^{2}) lot at the corner of Fullerton Avenue and South Street for a million dollar building, which was to accommodate 1,500 students. (Note: All three previous Academy buildings were built within the original glebe boundaries.) On January 23, 1928, the first classes were held in the present Newburgh Free Academy building, but it was not until March 1928 that the construction work was finally completed. In the fall of 1931, an annex was added to the building, adding dressing rooms, a music room, and an additional place for gym work.

In 1936, WPA muralist Lee Woodward Zeigler was hired by the Board of Education to paint murals in either the auditorium or vestibule. A part-time New Windsor resident, Zeigler was a popular muralist at the height of his career. He favored the idea of possibly painting the Muses, but the Board of Education supported the depiction of a local historical scene or something more academic. Boston architect Ralph Adams Cram wrote to Zeigler and recommended that he create a set of murals to depict the progress of education in Western world, from the School of Athens to the College of William & Mary. Zeigler thought this subject matter was too arresting, and that visitors would not grasp the images. He decided to paint two vertical murals, flanking the stage, featuring Renaissance figures meant to represent the dramatic arts and music.

In the first ten years of its occupancy pupil enrollment grew from about 1,100 to more than 2,200. The teaching staff increased from 39 to more than 75. To relieve the overcrowding Columbia University Teachers College recommended that two new junior high schools should be built in order to keep Newburgh up with the times. In spite of the Great Depression, two schools, North Junior High School which still stands and operates on Route 9W and South Junior High School which also still stands and operates on Monument Street, were built with the aid of a 45% grant from the Public Works Administration. In 1937 both buildings were dedicated, and the academy began to see its enrollment drop back to around 1,500 pupils.

==== Addition of science wing ====
In the early 1960s, as the baby boomer generation reached high school age, a major addition was built on the north side of the building along Roe Street. The wing was designed to meet Space Age sensibilities, incentivizing students to enter STEM careers. Among the new features were a planetarium, laboratories for chemistry and physics, a greenhouse, mobile animal cabinets, a climatorium for weather measurements, courtyard and a 250-seat lecture room with a dividing wall. A dark room for photography and a TV studio were also added. The planetarium was built with a 30-foot dome visible to passersby, fitted with 90 adjustable seats and used a Model A3P Prime machine. Students in the elementary and junior high schools would be brought there on field trips for their science curriculum. It is no longer in full use. The new addition opened for classes in September 1965.

In October, Sen. Robert F. Kennedy held a Democratic Rally in the city and came to speak to students.

==== Racial tension ====
The school was fairly diverse by the end of the 1960s. While it had been majority WASP for much of its history, by the 1940s the school was becoming majority Italian, Irish and German. Smaller populations included African Americans, Greeks, Poles and the addition of Puerto Ricans in the late 1960s. Isolated skirmishes began to occur between white students and students of color. Racial tensions only escalated with Urban renewal, as many students of color and their families were displaced.

Many black students voiced concerns and grievances about treatment they deemed unfair. Militant 18-year-old student George Fleming and others petitioned for a Martin Luther King Jr. and Malcolm X assembly in school. Fleming had also requested busing to school for students living in the city. He and other classmates were aligned with the Black Panthers. On April 23, 1969, Fleming and two of his friends entered the office of the principal, Dr. Leslie M. Tourville, with unloaded BB guns as protest. The teens were immediately arrested and sent to jail for 15 days. In court, William Kunstler represented Fleming. During the trial, he was held in contempt four times for his use of "black ghetto American language." Fleming told Kunstler he accepted him because he was the blackest white man he had ever met.

==== Addition of west wing ====
In more recent years, pupil enrollment numbers in the upper two thousands is not uncommon, yet Newburgh Free Academy is prided on still providing a quality education for each and every student, with class sizes ranging between four and thirty-five.

In 2002, construction began on the installment of an additional building connected to the original site. Construction ended in early 2003, providing 35+ classrooms, a black-box theatre and a state of the art dance education classroom. The courtyard of the Science Wing became a cafeteria.

In 2004 NFA, and the school district as a whole, became the first K–12 educational system in New York State to deal with an employed district-wide administrator going through a gender transition while on the job. Because of such resistance from the adults on campus, not generally the students, the school board paid this individual a hefty cash settlement (greater than $90,000) to resign.

==== Creation of North and West Campuses ====
Beginning with the 2011–12 school year, Newburgh Free Academy extended to two campuses, utilizing the former North Junior High building, now known as "NFA North Campus" The current school building becoming "NFA Main Campus." Both buildings hold students in grades 9–12, in an effort to meet state requirements for a standard high school. The concept is that both high schools are combined, and all activities stretch between the two campuses. Communication between the two campuses is not yet well established. The enrollment figure for NFA collectively is expected to increase to 5,000 students. In 2016, the district opened a new campus in the former West Street School, close to the two campuses. Of the new campus, which is described as a "non-traditional high school" the district said:

"NFA West Campus is a school of choice. Honoring student choice paves the way for students to take charge of their education. The Goal of this campus is to provide positive learning experiences that are flexible and personalized. Not all students are successful in a traditional environment. We strive to provide opportunities for academic success through non-traditional approaches to learning in a supportive environment. NFA West is a Big Picture Learning (BPL) school that strives to be a place where students are known well, understood, respected and able to have genuine relationships with adults. Each scholar's educational program involves authentic experiences with real world standards and consequences, and is designed by the people who know the student best. Students’ learning plans grow out of their individual needs, interests, and passion."

Split between Main and North is the CTE program, which hosts programs in Architectural/Engineering Design, Automotive, Barbering, Ceramics, Cosmetology, Culinary Arts, Fashion, Lifetime Wellness and Fitness, Performing Arts, Visual Arts, Welding, & AFJROTC at Main. North offers Criminal Justice, Health Related Services, and is also the home of P-Tech program. The schools also have interscholastic sports and club activities. They include debate, youth in government, drama, step and hip-hop dance, Anime, Spanish club, photography, yearbook, ski and snowboard, and the Concept Vehicle Racing Team, which has designed, built, test driven, and raced fuel efficient vehicles from scratch and raced in the California marathon semi finals. The school's student literary and art magazine, The Colonnade, has been in print since the 1930s.

=== First attendance scandal ===
Beginning in 2011, the high school was involved in a scandal concerning widespread class cutting and poor graduation rates among Newburgh Free Academy basketball players during their state championship in 2008–09 and the 2009–10 season.

Star players on the 2008–09 and 2009–10 teams told the Times Herald-Record they skipped classes as their coach and administrators looked the other way or actively covered for them. Attendance records later obtained by the paper showed the top six players skipped more than 1,000 classes. E-mails showed NFA teachers had notified top administrators only to see their concerns brushed away. It was only after the allegations became public that the district took any corrective actions.

NFA's Principal Peter Copeletti and Athletic Director Chris Townsend both retired during the investigation. Coach Frank Dinnocenzio was replaced. Assistant Principal Karriem Bunce was suspended.

=== Student activism in 2018 ===
After the Marjory Stoneman Douglas High School shooting, 11th grade students immediately organized to rally against gun violence. A group of about 20 students participated in a nation-wide school walkout on March 14 to end gun violence. Wearing orange in solidarity, the students left their classrooms and gathered in front of the school. This quickly garnered safety concerns from the district. Other smaller demonstrations were held indoors, and students sat or laid down in the hallways as protest. While many students were focused on school shootings, others expressed concern for gun violence in Newburgh and those that had been lost to it.

An 11th grader approached school administrators to organize a Week of Awareness on topics including bullying, suicide prevention and gun violence. On March 23, two grade assemblies on gun violence and mass shootings were held, allowing students to speak. Some controversy emerged as an anti-gun control student prepared to speak in opposition to the students. The morning of the assembly, they withdrew their name from the lineup. 11th graders made speeches on issues related to the shooting, including the role of mental health statistics. This was in response to President Donald Trump's tweets blaming mass shootings solely on poor mental health. A representative from Moms Demand Action, Tom Campbell of the Newtown Action Alliance and James Skoufis were present.

During the month of March, a school shooting scare occurred when a YouTube video surfaced of an 11th grader referring to himself as a school shooter. In the video, the student poked fun at comments people had made about him, a recurrent one being that his appearance and behavior likened that of a school shooter. Without this context, students brought the video to administration and many did not return to school for the rest of the week.

=== Second attendance scandal ===
After the 2011 scandal, the school set new policies to prevent one from happening again, setting stricter guidelines and requiring more reporting from faculty and staff. Administration changed in 2015 and Raul Rodriguez became principal. In 2016, a former girls varsity basketball coach noticed that the school's attendance system, Infinite Campus, seemed to alter a student athlete's attendance record. Days earlier, the coach had notified administration that the student was ineligible to attend a state track competition due to exceeding excused absences. After notifying them, he checked Infinite Campus to find the student's attendance in excellent standing, contrary to its initial appearance. He wrote to the New York State Education Department on May 18, 2017, notifying them attendance policies may have been changed illegally. After following up on June 23 and July 28, the department neglected to respond as to whether they had investigated the school. In September, they opened an investigation on their own.

On the morning of October 23, 2018, officers from the Orange County District Attorney arrived at the Board of Education and Newburgh Free Academy. They served administration with a search warrant, seeking the district's attendance policies regarding academics and athletic participation. Later in the day, the district released a statement agreeing to comply.

In January 2019, a grand jury began looking into attendance findings, as the FBI began looking for witnesses and the Orange County DA began to seize information from the Board of Education. Many employees of the district pointed to the credit recovery program APEX as a continuing problem. The program had been enforced and misused. Failing students could stay after school to recover credits. According to the investigation, dozens of APEX students completed coursework for a 45-day quarter in under two hours, including six who did so in 20 minutes or less. Teachers alleged they were told they could provide unlimited chances for quizzes and assignments.

Many of the student athletes had been chronically absent with "illness" but had managed to get the excessive absences cleared. The investigation also found that 65 of the 110 students whose records were examined averaged 100 or more class absences per year. One student had 2,276 class absences, plus 1,272 latenesses, in four years.

As the investigation went on, ineligible students were found to be actively participating in football, boys soccer, wrestling, baseball and track.

Many community members, tax payers, parents and teachers were torn on the investigation. While many believed it to be necessary but upsetting, they felt the news media was finding opportunities to display Newburgh in a negative light. Several events occurred simultaneously with the investigation.

On Thursday, February 8, a science teacher at Main Campus was attempting to remove a student from a cafeteria when he was body slammed by the student onto the floor. The teacher, serving on lunch duty, was alone in his efforts and hospitalized. The student, a minor, was charged with felony assault, and was discovered to be skipping class in the cafeteria. As a result, a stricter attendance policy was enforced with the pressure of the attendance investigation. Teachers became outraged when a lack of sympathy was given, and believed that Main Campus had been neglected by the Board of Education because it was oversized and lacked resources. They led a demonstration in solidarity outside Main Campus. At a Board of Education meeting, two teachers testified on behalf of their coworker. One presented that student ID scanning machines had been broken for months and that teachers were subjected to dangerous working conditions.

On the morning of Monday, April 8, a mother trying to sign her 10th grade son out of school got into an argument with security. Humberto Perez, a police resource officer, got involved. The officer noticed that the woman's son appeared to have a kitchen knife concealed in his pants. When questioned about the knife, the student and officer had a brief altercation which resulted in deep cuts on the officer's hand. The officer was hospitalized and the student did not face charges. Further questioning revealed that he had been attacked and robbed on April 3 near First Street and City Terrace in Newburgh. The student was cornered and attacked at an abandoned house while walking home from school. About 50 to 70 others were present at the scene. The beating was filmed and spread on social media. In connection, seven students were arrested for felony robbery, two of which were under the age of 17 and three of which were student athletes. The student clarified that he brought the knife into the school to protect himself from bullies and his attackers. He had previously been attacked at Main Campus by bullies. His mother claims that faculty did not provide the help he needed. Online, death threats were made to the student and his family. In regard to the student accidentally injuring the officer, one commented: "Kid should have been shot, it would have been justified." Police wondered how a serrated kitchen knife was able to get through school security. It tightened after the incident.

In early May, a student at Main Campus released a homemade trailer on YouTube for an anti-bullying documentary he planned to film. The trailer, which featured videos of Main Campus, was brought to the attention of school officials. In an interview with a news station, the student stated they had been bullied since elementary school for their sexuality and were treated unjustly by administration. Failure to take action against bullying was a commonality that many parents in the school district shared, and the news interview was spread around social media. Many were upset with the school district's lack of direct action.

James Skoufis was in contact with superintendent Roberto Padilla, who claimed parts of the grand jury's report of findings were untrue. State education commissioner MaryEllen Elia was notified about the findings as well. As the school prepared to re-hire many of the coaches involved in the scandal for the 2019–2020 school year, they reconsidered. The district invested in a program, ScholarChip, to record attendance more efficiently.

== Athletics ==
The NFA basketball team won the 2009 New York State Class AA Championship, as mentioned above. The NFA soccer team also won the 2009 New York State Class AA Championship. The NFA crew team's men's 4+ won the state regatta in 2008, and went on to compete in the national regatta winning 6th place, beating out all public schools in their category. The NFA football team has made the State Championship game three times, in 2011, 2014, and 2022. Losing games to Orchard Park, Jamestown, and Buffalo-Bennett respectively. The NFA baseball team has not been to the state tournament since winning section 9 in 2005, however, they lost in extra innings to the eventual state champions, Kingston, in the section 9 semifinals in 2012. In track & field, the NFA boys 4x400 meter relay were 2021 national champions and received All-American honors.

Newburgh is rivals with Monroe-Woodbury, Kingston, Middletown, and Pine Bush.

== Alumni ==
- Rob Cohen, film and television director and producer
- Pardison Fontaine, rapper
- Willie Fraser, professional baseball player
- Michael H. Hirschberg, District Attorney of Orange County and New York Supreme Court Justice.
- Hubertus Hoyt, Class of 1974, professional tennis player
- Bud Kerr, professional football player and college football coach
- Lexi Lawson, class of 2002, theater actress and singer who made her Broadway debut as Eliza Hamilton in Hamilton on Broadway
- Ksenia Makarova, Russian-American figure skater
- John Palermo, college football coach and player
- Justin Rutty, professional basketball player
- Mickey Scott, professional baseball player
- Bill Short, professional baseball player
- Saul Williams, poet, rapper and author
- Erica Mena, actress, model, socialite

== Sources ==
- Newburgh School District web site
