= Road Warriors (Atlantic League) =

Professional baseball team of the Atlantic League

Logo
Cap insignia

Information
- League: Atlantic League of Professional Baseball
- Location: None
- Ballpark: None
- Founded: 1998
- Former name: Pennsylvania Road Warriors (2002–2004); Lehigh Valley Black Diamonds (1999–2001); Newburgh Black Diamonds (1998)
- Colors: red, black, grey
- Ownership: Atlantic League
- Manager: Ellie Rodríguez
- Website: Official website

The Road Warriors are a professional baseball team owned by the Atlantic League of Professional Baseball. The traveling team has operated intermittently throughout the league's history, usually being activated in years when the league otherwise has an odd number of teams.

== History ==
The original plan was for the team to be known as the Lehigh Valley Black Diamonds, based in Northampton County, Pennsylvania, where a planned 5,000-seat stadium called the Lehigh Valley Multi-Purpose Sport Complex in Williams Township near Easton, Pennsylvania, was slated to be completed by 1999. In the interim, the team played the league's inaugural 1998 season as the Newburgh Black Diamonds at Delano-Hitch Stadium in Newburgh, New York. However, the owners of the Lehigh Valley complex and the team filed for bankruptcy and left the stadium unfinished. Rather than stay in Newburgh, the league took over the franchise and transformed it into a traveling team. In 2000, the team played in a small ballpark in Quakertown, Pennsylvania, with little to no fan support. One game had a paid attendance of two people. Former Cincinnati Reds third baseman Wayne Krenchicki managed the team from 1998 to 2000 before becoming the manager of the Camden Riversharks from 2001 to 2006. The Lehigh Valley Multi-Purpose Sport Complex was demolished in early 2005, without ever hosting a single baseball game.

The team was renamed the Pennsylvania Road Warriors for the 2002–2004 seasons. In 2005, the Lancaster Barnstormers took the place of the Road Warriors. When the Nashua Pride left to join the Can-Am League, the league re-established the Road Warriors for the 2006 season to replace the Pride. With the move of the Atlantic City Surf to the Can-Am League for the 2007 season, the Road Warriors remained to fill the gaps in the schedule until the Southern Maryland Blue Crabs joined in 2008. The Road Warriors returned in 2011 to fill in scheduling holes left by the departing Newark Bears and in 2018 as part of the Bridgeport Bluefish's relocation to High Point, North Carolina; that relocation was scheduled to be completed before the 2019 season. They were to be activated again for the 2020 season following the departure of the New Britain Bees to the Futures Collegiate Baseball League, but did not compete as the season was canceled due to the COVID-19 pandemic. Following the addition of the Staten Island FerryHawks as the ALPB's ninth team in 2022, the "filler" team spot that would've normally been given to the Road Warriors was purchased by the owners of the Lexington Legends. This team, the Wild Health Genomes, shared Wild Health Field with the Legends and were replaced by the Spire City Ghost Hounds in 2023 and the Hagerstown Flying Boxcars in 2024.

The 2004 Pennsylvania Road Warriors finished with the worst record in Atlantic League history at 23–103. The Road Warriors' 2007 season proved to be their most successful as they finished at 43–83. Contributing to the team's disadvantage is the Atlantic League does not grant the team any "designated" home games, meaning they never receive the home field advantage other teams have, so must always hit first. (This is in contrast to Major League Baseball policy, which grants "designated home" status to teams forced to move games to their opponent's stadium.)

There have been two players to make it to Major League Baseball after suiting up for the Road Warriors. Catcher Robinson Cancel appeared in 19 games for the 2003 Road Warriors before making it back to MLB in 2008 with the New York Mets. Pitcher Alberto Castillo also made it to the major leagues with the Baltimore Orioles. Castillo pitched for the Road Warriors in 2006 and 2007 before being invited to spring training with the Orioles in 2008. Castillo quickly pitched his way up the system and appeared in 28 games with the O's going 1–0 with a 3.81 ERA and 23 strikeouts.

== Retired numbers ==
- 42, Jackie Robinson, retired throughout baseball
