= Donal Hughes =

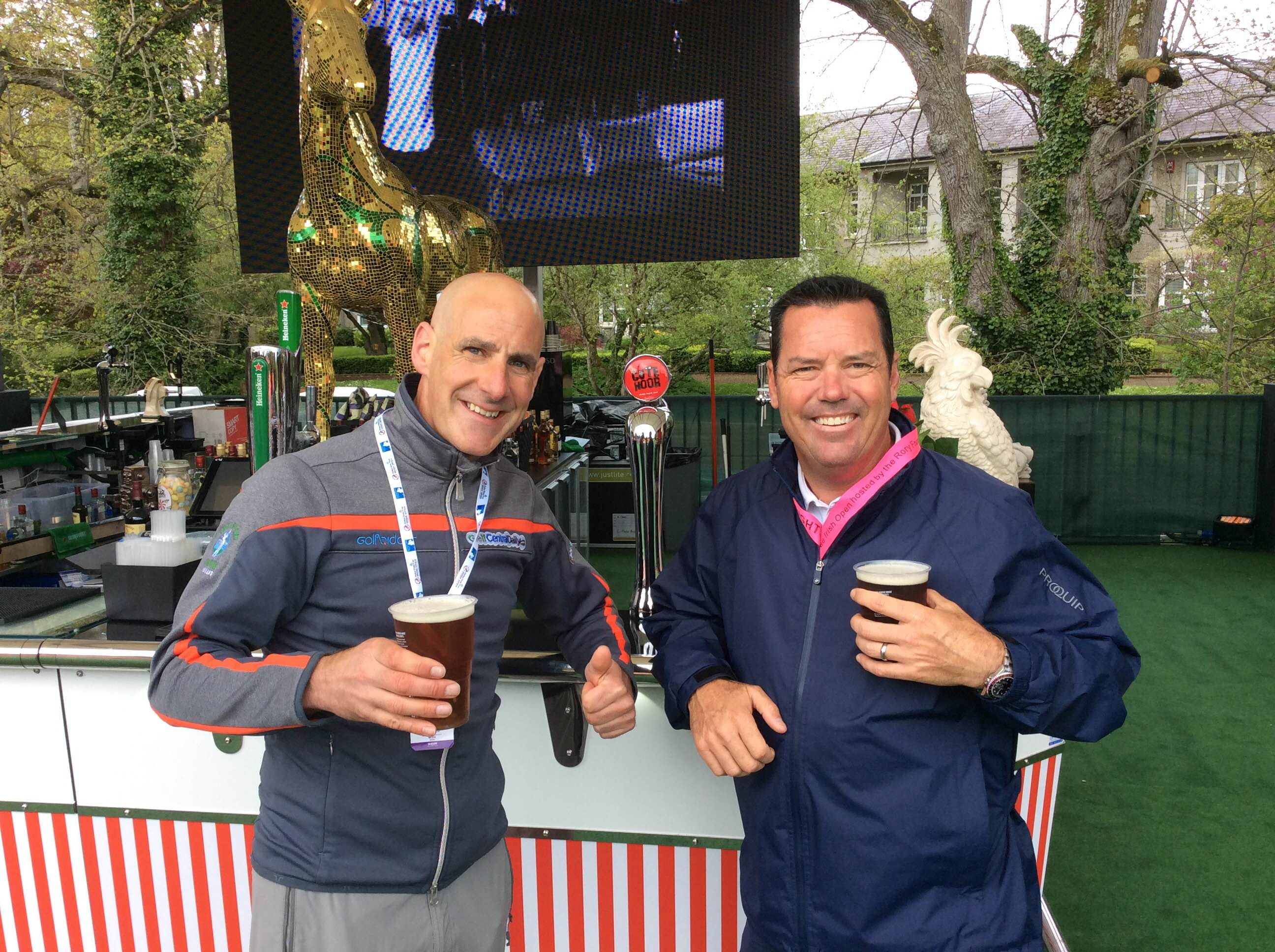
Donal Hughes with fellow broadcaster Rich Beem at the 2016 Irish Open

Donal Hughes (born in 1974) is an Irish sport broadcaster, influencer, and athlete. Originally known as a sports writer, Hughes transitioned his hobby into a second career when he became the golfing "SpinDoctor" for the Irish Examiner. Later, he became head of the satirical golf website GolfCentralDaily. He curates social media and works as an influencer for sports companies involved in golf, Gaelic football, and triathlon. In addition, he is the Chief Equipment Reviewer of Golf Bidder, including for their YouTube channel.

== Biography ==
Hughes was born in 1974 and raised in Ballinrobe, County Mayo, located in the West of Ireland. He completed a degree in Applied Chemistry at Dublin City University. He later earned a PhD in 1999. After completing his studies, Hughes returned to Mayo, where he eventually married and became a father of four.

== Sporting career ==
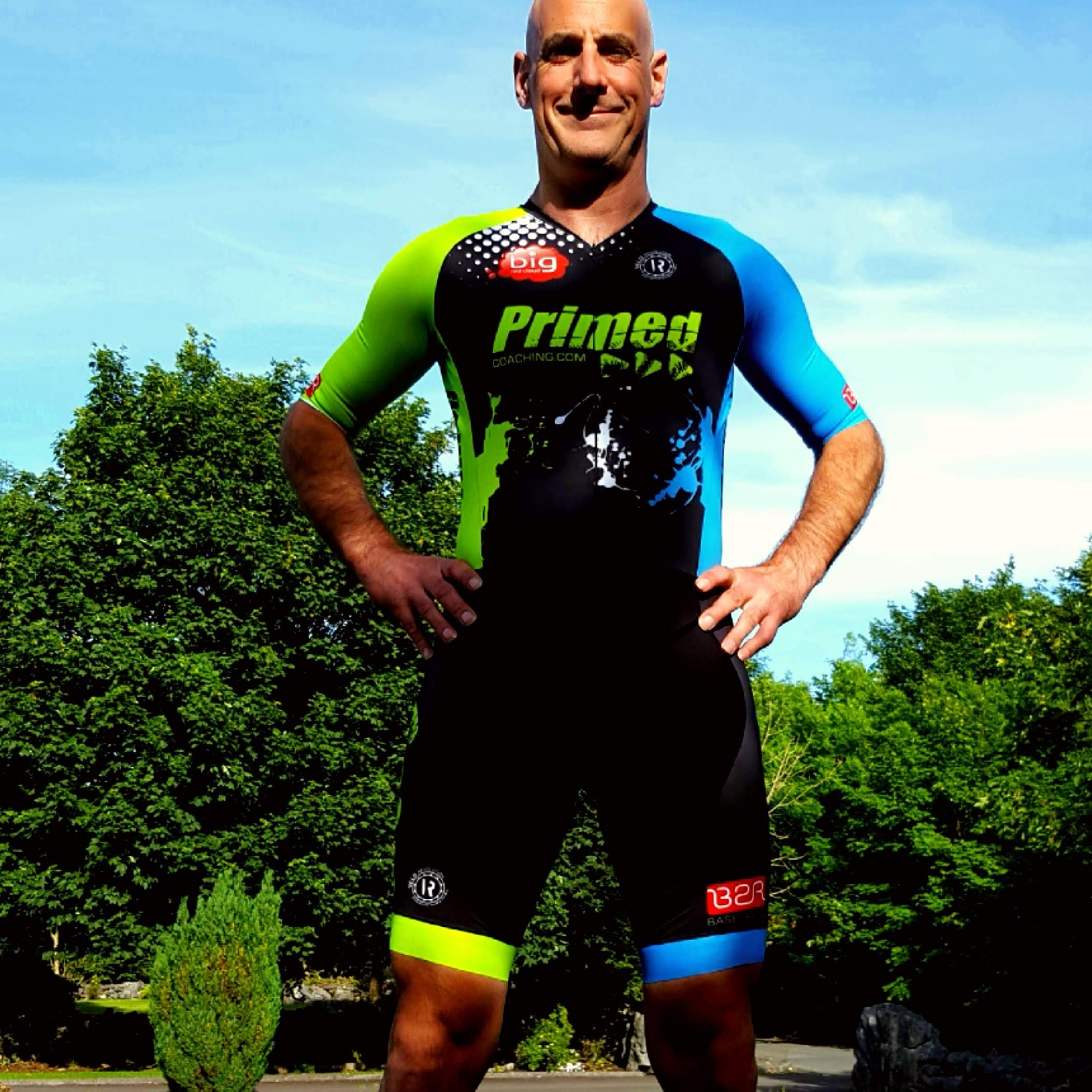

Hughes, in his early life, represented his county Mayo in Gaelic football at all underage levels as a goalkeeper. Hughes took up golf following an injury and now competes in Ironman events.

At the Hurricane Matthew-shortened Ironman in North Carolina, it was reported in the media that he intended to run through the finish line and cycle an extra 62 miles to ensure that he completed the full Ironman distance of 2.4-mile swim, 112-mile bike and a marathon 26.22-mile run on that day. Hughes also now works as a Gaelic Football goalkeeping coach.

== Charity work ==
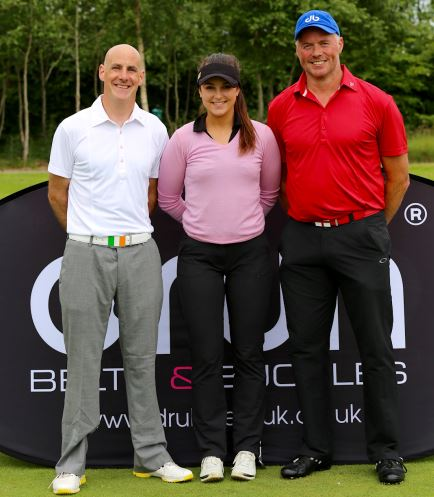
Ireland Captain Donal Hughes with Kelly Tidy And England Captain Mick Hill at The Druh Cup 2015

In 2007, Hughes undertook The Round Ireland Golf Challenge for charity. Along with fellow golfer Michael Nolan, Hughes completed 32 rounds of golf in each of Ireland's 32 counties, over 32 consecutive days finishing on 6 September 2007 at The Heritage Golf Club. During the challenge, the pair played every course and covered a driving distance of over 5000km. The achievement raised €100,000 for children's and cancer charities in Ireland including Playing For Life, The Friends of St. Lukes, Barretstown Castle, and The Jack and Jill Foundation. Hughes continues his involvement in charitable activities as an envoy for an anonymous donor, supporting rural and social development projects in the West of Ireland.

== Golf writing career ==
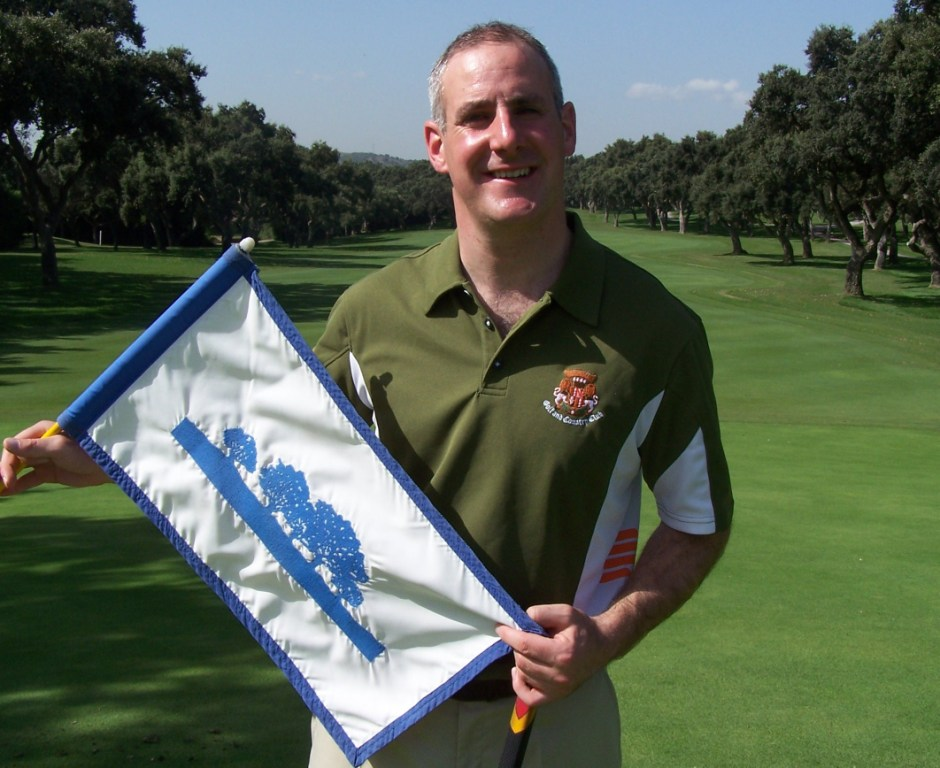
Donal Hughes on the 18th green in Valderrama whilst reviewing the course for the Irish Examiner.

In preparation for his Round Ireland Golf Challenge, Donal Hughes was commissioned by the Irish Examiner to write a log of his challenge. Following the project, Hughes was retained by the Irish Examiner to write a weekly golfing column in the paper each Tuesday. Known as the "SpinDoctor", Hughes' page was featured until 2012. Hughes now runs the website GolfCentralDaily and is the golf equipment reviewer and interviewer for UK based golf retailer Golfbidder. He also curates social media for several golf related companies.
