= James D. Hughes =

United States Air Force general (1922–2024)

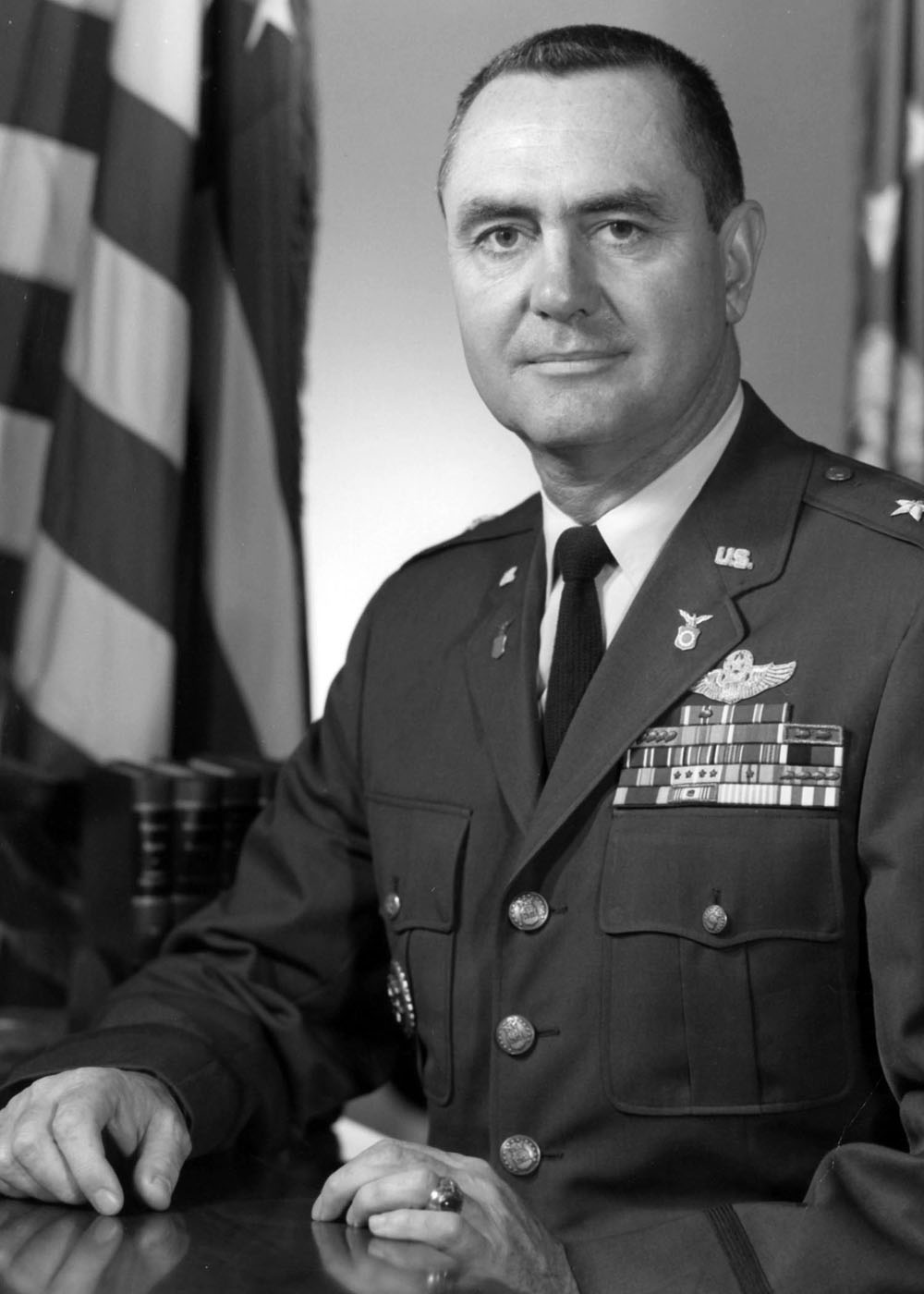
- Born: July 7, 1922; Balmville, New York, U.S.
- Died: January 12, 2024 (aged 101); Potomac Falls, Virginia, U.S.
- Military career
- Allegiance: United States of America
- Branch: United States Air Force
- Service years: 1946–1981
- Rank: Lieutenant General
- Commands: Commander in chief, Pacific Air Forces
- Conflicts: Korean War; Vietnam War
- Awards: Distinguished Service Medal (3); Distinguished Flying Cross (2); Bronze Star; Air Medal (10); Air Force Commendation Medal (2); Purple Heart; Order of the Sword; Order of National Security Merit 2nd grade Republic of Vietnam Gallantry Cross with palm Order of the Crown of Thailand (First Class-Knight Grand Cross)

James Donald Hughes (July 7, 1922 – January 12, 2024) was a lieutenant general in the United States Air Force (USAF) who was commander in chief, Pacific Air Forces, with headquarters at Hickam Air Force Base, Hawaii. He commanded the air component of the unified Pacific Command with an overall mission of planning, conducting, controlling and coordinating offensive and defensive air operations.

== Biography ==
Hughes was born on July 7, 1922, in Balmville, New York. He graduated from the United States Military Academy, West Point, New York, in 1946, and the National War College, Fort Lesley J. McNair, Washington, D.C., in 1966. He also earned a master's degree in international affairs from The George Washington University, Washington, D.C., in 1966.

After graduating from the academy, he completed pilot training and joined the 36th Troop Carrier Squadron at Pope Field, North Carolina. In April 1948, he went to Japan as a fighter pilot and, in April 1949, joined the 8th Fighter-Bomber Wing as a fighter pilot and group adjutant. He flew 101 combat missions during the Korean War.

Hughes returned to the United States in March 1951 and served as group adjutant and fighter pilot with the 20th Fighter-Bomber Group at Shaw Air Force Base, South Carolina. He subsequently accompanied the group on successive moves to Langley Air Force Base, Virginia and RAF Wethersfield, England. Hughes returned from England in February 1955 and was assigned to the Directorate of Military Personnel, Headquarters, United States Air Force, Washington, D.C.

In July 1957, Hughes was appointed military aide to Vice President Richard Nixon. He moved to George Air Force Base, California, in February 1961, where he served as squadron operations officer with the 31st Tactical Fighter Wing.

Hughes moved to Tan Son Nhut Air Base, South Vietnam, where he served from August 1962 to September 1963 as assistant operations officer and chief of the Special Operations Branch of Headquarters 2nd Air Division. He then returned to the United States for an assignment in the Office of the Deputy Chief of Staff for Personnel at USAF Headquarters.

After graduation from the National War College in August 1966, Hughes was named vice commander of the 4525th Fighter Weapons Wing at Nellis Air Force Base, Nevada. In July 1968, he was assigned as director of safety at Headquarters United States Air Forces in Europe, Lindsey Air Station, West Germany.

In November 1968, Hughes returned to the United States for appointment as armed forces aide to President Nixon, effective 29 January 1969. The position title was subsequently changed to military assistant to the president. He served in this capacity until February 1972 when he was named vice commander of 12th Air Force at Bergstrom Air Force Base, Texas.

Hughes transferred to Udorn Royal Thai Air Force Base, Thailand, in September 1972 as deputy commander, Seventh/Thirteenth Air Force, and became commander when that unit was reorganized as Detachment 7, 13th Air Force, in March 1973. He moved to Nakhon Phanom Royal Thai Air Force Base in April 1973 to assume duties as deputy commander, 7th Air Force, and chief of staff, U.S. Support Activities Group.

In December 1973, Hughes assumed command of 9th Air Force at Shaw Air Force Base. He remained in this position until July 1975 when he moved back to Bergstrom as commander of 12th Air Force. He assumed his current command in June 1978.

Hughes was a command pilot. His military decorations and awards include the Distinguished Service Medal with two oak leaf clusters, Distinguished Flying Cross with oak leaf cluster, Bronze Star Medal, Air Medal with nine oak leaf clusters, Air Force Commendation Medal with oak leaf cluster, Purple Heart, Distinguished Unit Citation emblem with two oak leaf clusters, Air Force Outstanding Unit Award ribbon, Republic of Korea Presidential Unit Citation, Republic of Korea Order of National Security Merit (Gugseon Medal), Republic of Vietnam Gallantry Cross with palm and the Most Noble Order of the Crown of Thailand (First Class-Knight Grand Cross). He is a recipient of the Order of the Sword, the highest honor bestowed upon a commander by his non-commissioned officer corps.

Hughes was awarded pilot wings from the Republic of Korea Air Force, Republic of China Air Force, Philippine Air Force and the Royal Thai Air Force.

Hughes was promoted to lieutenant general May 31, 1974, with the same date of rank. He retired on July 1, 1981. In 2009, he received the 2009 Distinguished Graduate Award from his alma mater, the United States Military Academy. He participated in the celebrations of Richard Nixon's 98th birthday with the Richard Nixon Foundation in 2011, giving the keynote address. He turned 100 on July 7, 2022, and died on January 12, 2024, at the age of 101.
