= Balmville, New York =

- Census-designated place
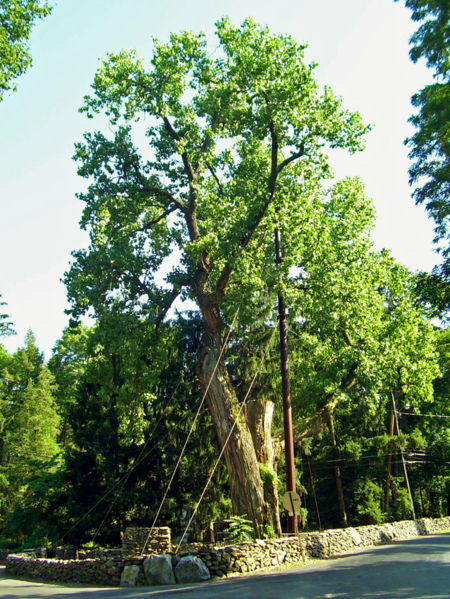
- The Balmville Tree

- Location in Orange County and the state of New York.

- Location within the state of New York
- Coordinates: 41°31′40″N 74°1′28″W
- Country: United States
- State: New York
- County: Orange

Area
  - Total: 2.12 sq mi (5.50 km^{2})
  - Land: 2.12 sq mi (5.48 km^{2})
  - Water: 0.0039 sq mi (0.01 km^{2})
- Elevation: 217 ft (66 m)

Population (2020)
  - Total: 3,197
  - Density: 1,509.8/sq mi (582.95/km^{2})
- Time zone: UTC-5 (Eastern (EST))
  - Summer (DST): UTC-4 (EDT)
- ZIP code: 12550
- Area code: 845
- FIPS code: 36-04286
- GNIS feature ID: 0942941

Balmville is a hamlet (and census-designated place) in Orange County, New York, United States. It is part of the Kiryas Joel–Poughkeepsie–Newburgh metropolitan area as well as the larger New York metropolitan area. It is located in the southeastern part of the Town of Newburgh. The population was 3,197 at the 2020 census. Many wealthy, influential, and upper income families live in Balmville on roads such as River Road, Sloane Road, Commonwealth Avenue, Susan Drive, and Grand Avenue. Susan Drive is accredited for housing the former Delano Family Estate (Algonac). The Delano family was the family of the mother of Franklin D. Roosevelt, and she in fact was born and raised at Algonac. Many homes in Balmville are incredibly expensive due to their pristine views of the Hudson River. Balmville is also the site of the Powelton Club Country Club. It currently ranks as the highest income hamlet in the greater Newburgh area.

Balmville is immediately north of, and adjoins, the city of Newburgh.

Balmville was home to the Balmville Tree, New York's smallest state forest. The tree was one of three federally protected trees in the nation. It was called a "miracle tree" due to its age (over 300 years) for its species. On August 5, 2015, because of safety concerns caused by the rapid deterioration of the tree, it was cut down and removed by the New York State Department of Environmental Conservation.

== Geography ==
Balmville is located at 41°31′40″N 74°1′28″W (41.527893, -74.024426).

According to the United States Census Bureau, the CDP has a total area of 2.1 square miles (5.4 km^{2}), all land.

== Demographics ==
Historical population
Census	Pop.	Note	%±
2000	3,339		—
2010	3,178		−4.8%
2020	3,197		0.6%
U.S. Decennial Census

=== 2020 census ===
As of the 2020 census, Balmville had a population of 3,197. The median age was 44.7 years. 18.0% of residents were under the age of 18 and 19.0% of residents were 65 years of age or older. For every 100 females there were 98.6 males, and for every 100 females age 18 and over there were 94.9 males age 18 and over.

100.0% of residents lived in urban areas, while 0.0% lived in rural areas.

There were 1,200 households in Balmville, of which 26.9% had children under the age of 18 living in them. Of all households, 52.5% were married-couple households, 14.8% were households with a male householder and no spouse or partner present, and 25.5% were households with a female householder and no spouse or partner present. About 25.6% of all households were made up of individuals and 12.8% had someone living alone who was 65 years of age or older.

There were 1,283 housing units, of which 6.5% were vacant. The homeowner vacancy rate was 1.4% and the rental vacancy rate was 3.2%.

Racial composition as of the 2020 census
Race	Number	Percent
White	1,913	59.8%
Black or African American	499	15.6%
American Indian and Alaska Native	19	0.6%
Asian	123	3.8%
Native Hawaiian and Other Pacific Islander	3	0.1%
Some other race	282	8.8%
Two or more races	358	11.2%
Hispanic or Latino (of any race)	687	21.5%

=== 2000 census ===
As of the census of 2000, there were 3,339 people, 1,257 households, and 946 families residing in the CDP. The population density was 1,572.3 inhabitants per square mile (607.1/km^{2}). There were 1,288 housing units at an average density of 606.5 per square mile (234.2/km^{2}). The racial makeup of the CDP was 79.66% White, 9.46% African American, 0.03% Native American, 3.05% Asian, 0.12% Pacific Islander, 4.88% from other races, and 2.79% from two or more races. Hispanic or Latino of any race were 10.03% of the population.

There were 1,257 households, out of which 31.4% had children under the age of 18 living with them, 61.1% were married couples living together, 10.5% had a female householder with no husband present, and 24.7% were non-families. 19.9% of all households were made up of individuals, and 8.1% had someone living alone who was 65 years of age or older. The average household size was 2.65 and the average family size was 3.06.

In the CDP, the population was spread out, with 23.0% under the age of 18, 7.2% from 18 to 24, 27.3% from 25 to 44, 26.2% from 45 to 64, and 16.3% who were 65 years of age or older. The median age was 40 years. For every 100 females, there were 91.6 males. For every 100 females age 18 and over, there were 90.4 males.

The median income for a household in the CDP was $66,979, and the median income for a family was $72,925. Males had a median income of $50,426 versus $38,884 for females. The per capita income for the CDP was $30,646. About 1.0% of families and 2.2% of the population were below the poverty line, including 1.8% of those under age 18 and 1.5% of those age 65 or over.

== James D. Hughes ==
Balmville was the birthplace of Air Force General James D. Hughes. A graduate of the U.S. Military Academy at West Point (located only about 17 miles away), Gen Hughes continued to live in Balmville with his family for most of his life. General Hughes was the military aide to Richard M. Nixon during the latter's second term as Vice President of the United States and again during his subsequent presidency.

== Notable Locations ==
=== The Balmville Tree ===
The Balmville Tree was located behind the current Balmville Elementary School, where Balmville Road, River Road, and Commonwealth Avenue intersect. It was the smallest state forest in New York, and was one of only three trees protected by the federal government. It had been on the National Register of Historic Places since 2000. Rapid deterioration of the condition of the tree resulted in its removal by the New York State Department of Conservation on August 5, 2015.

=== Algonac ===
Balmville was the site of Algonac — the birthplace and home of Sara Delano, the mother of U.S. President Franklin Delano Roosevelt. Algonac was located at what is now Susan Drive.

=== Balmville Grange ===
The Balmville Grange Hall is located on Fostertown Road 2/10 of a mile west of the intersection with Route 9W and is the last remaining grange in the Town of Newburgh. It celebrated its 100th anniversary on September 28, 2003.

=== Newburgh Beacon Bridge and Interstate 84 ===
The western terminus of the Newburgh-Beacon Bridge is in Balmville. In fact, Interstate 84, which crosses the bridge, bisects Balmville just south of the Powelton Club. Property was taken from the Powelton Club for the construction of this highway, although not as much land was taken as occurred in the 1920s for the construction of U.S. Route 9W. The New York State Bridge Authority recently constructed parking lots on Grand Avenue to accommodate hikers who utilize the pedestrian path on the bridge. This was done to discourage vehicles parking under the overpass, a security concern since the September 11, 2001 attacks.

== Education ==
It is in the Newburgh Enlarged City School District.

=== Balmville Elementary School ===
Balmville has been a part of the Newburgh Enlarged City School District since consolidation in 1963. The original Balmville School building stood on what later became the Desmond Estate. When that building (which has long since been demolished) outgrew its space, it was replaced by a new building built on land donated by Warren Delano of the Delano family with funds donated by his daughter, Annie Delano-Hitch. Mrs. Hitch was a lifelong Balmville resident whose sister was Sara Delano Roosevelt, the mother of U.S. President Franklin Delano Roosevelt. This old elementary school building with a cornerstone indicating construction in 1897, was taken down in 2022. The empty lot stands on what is now the northeast corner of U.S. Route 9W and Fostertown Road. (The current Route 9W was constructed in the late 1920s.) It was immediately north of the current elementary school, at the southeast corner of 9W and Fostertown Road, which was initially constructed in 1953-54, but was added onto many times since, most recently in 2007. In 2007, the Board of Education of the Newburgh Enlarged City School District voted to demolish the older school building and expend $375,000 to do so. The school board concluded that the building is "unstable" and poses a "health and safety hazard even to those just walking or parking outside." This conclusion was based upon an architectural survey commissioned by the Board of Education. Local civic and historic groups rose up and demanded that this historically and architecturally significant building be spared. Local developers Rick Milton and Keith Libolt stepped forward and offered buy the building, restore it, and lease it back to the school district. Milton charged that District Administrators and the architect's report "scared the board into thinking that the building is going to fall down. It's not true." Milton further charged that the administrators were simply looking for a quick way to create more parking spaces for the "new" school and contended that additional parking could be found elsewhere on the school property. The Board of Education relented and rescinded its demolition order. Although most classes have been held in the "new" Balmville School since 1954, some classes had been held in the "old" building as late as the mid-1970s, and it had been used for offices and other administrative purposes up to the mid-1980s. It had been used for storage since. Milton and Libolt propose using the "old" building for administrative and office space, freeing the space used in the "new" building for these purposes and also for expanding the school library. On Oct. 30, 2007, the Board of Education voted to table the demolition for the time being.

=== Secondary and higher education ===
While many residents of Balmville attend Newburgh Free Academy, the sole comprehensive high school of the Newburgh school district, others attend local independent schools. A large number of graduates from Balmville have attended Ivy League schools such as Harvard, Princeton, and Yale.
