= Dwaar Kill (Wallkill River tributary) =

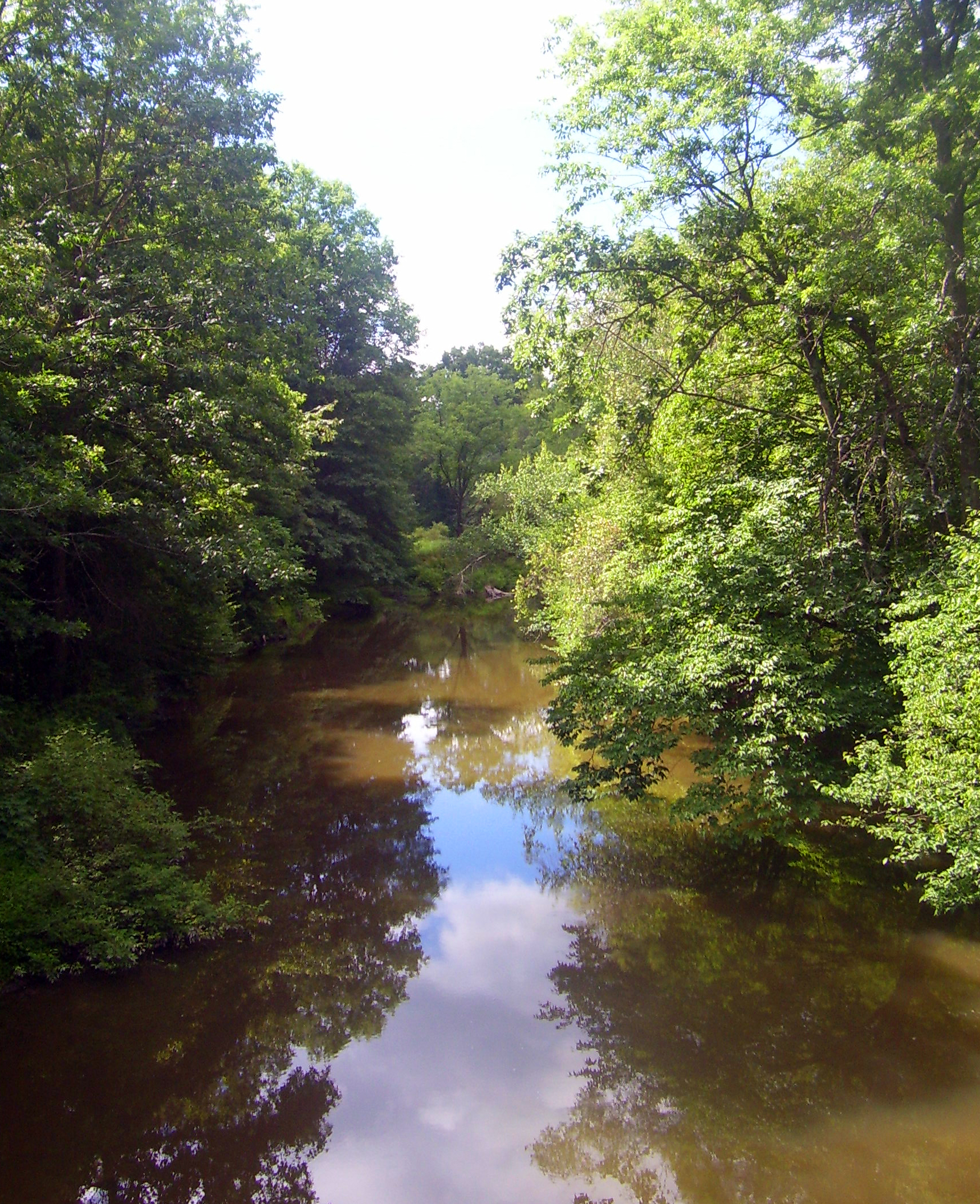
- Dwaar Kill in the town of Shawangunk

Location
- Country: United States
- State: New York
- Region: Hudson Valley
- Counties: Orange, Ulster
- Towns: Wallkill, Crawford, Shawangunk

Physical characteristics
- Source: Lake Henneside
  - location: W of Circleville
  - coordinates: 41°30′57″N 74°23′29″W
  - elevation: 680 ft (210 m)
- Mouth: Wallkill River
  - location: S of Galeville
  - coordinates: 41°37′34″N 74°11′18″W
  - elevation: 220 ft (67 m)
- Length: 17 mi (27 km), SW-NE
- Basin size: 28 mi^{2} (73 km^{2})

The Dwaar Kill is a 17-mile-long (27 km) tributary of the Wallkill River that drains a 28-square-mile (73 km^{2}) area of Orange and Ulster counties in the U.S. state of New York. It is the Wallkill's second-longest tributary after the Shawangunk Kill, whose course it parallels somewhat to the east.

Like the Wallkill and the Shawangunk, which also has a tributary named the Dwaar Kill, it flows in a northeastern direction toward the Hudson River via Rondout Creek. Unlike them it flows entirely through rural areas.

== Course ==
It rises at Lake Henneside in the town of Wallkill, just west of the hamlet of Circleville. After flowing downhill it takes a brief southward loop, crosses under NY 302, and then assumes a northeastern heading into the town of Crawford. In a swampy area a few miles downriver just east of Bullville, it crosses under NY 17K and then passes through Bullville Army Reserve Center.

Continuing northeast, it flows past the former hamlet of Searsville, where early settlers built mills to tap its power. Two miles (3.2 km), NY 52 crosses on a small bridge as the kill is now too wide for a culvert. It continues north into Ulster County and the town of Shawangunk, where Bruyn Turnpike (Ulster County Route 18) is the first to cross.

A short distance north of that crossing, it turns toward the east, taking it just south of Shawangunk Grasslands National Wildlife Refuge. Albany Post Road (Ulster County Route 9) crosses, and then the Dwaar flows past the Crowell brick works. It turns to the north and drains into the Wallkill just south of the former hamlet of Galeville and Wallkill Correctional Facility.

== See also ==
- List of rivers of New York
