= List of county routes in Orange County, New York =

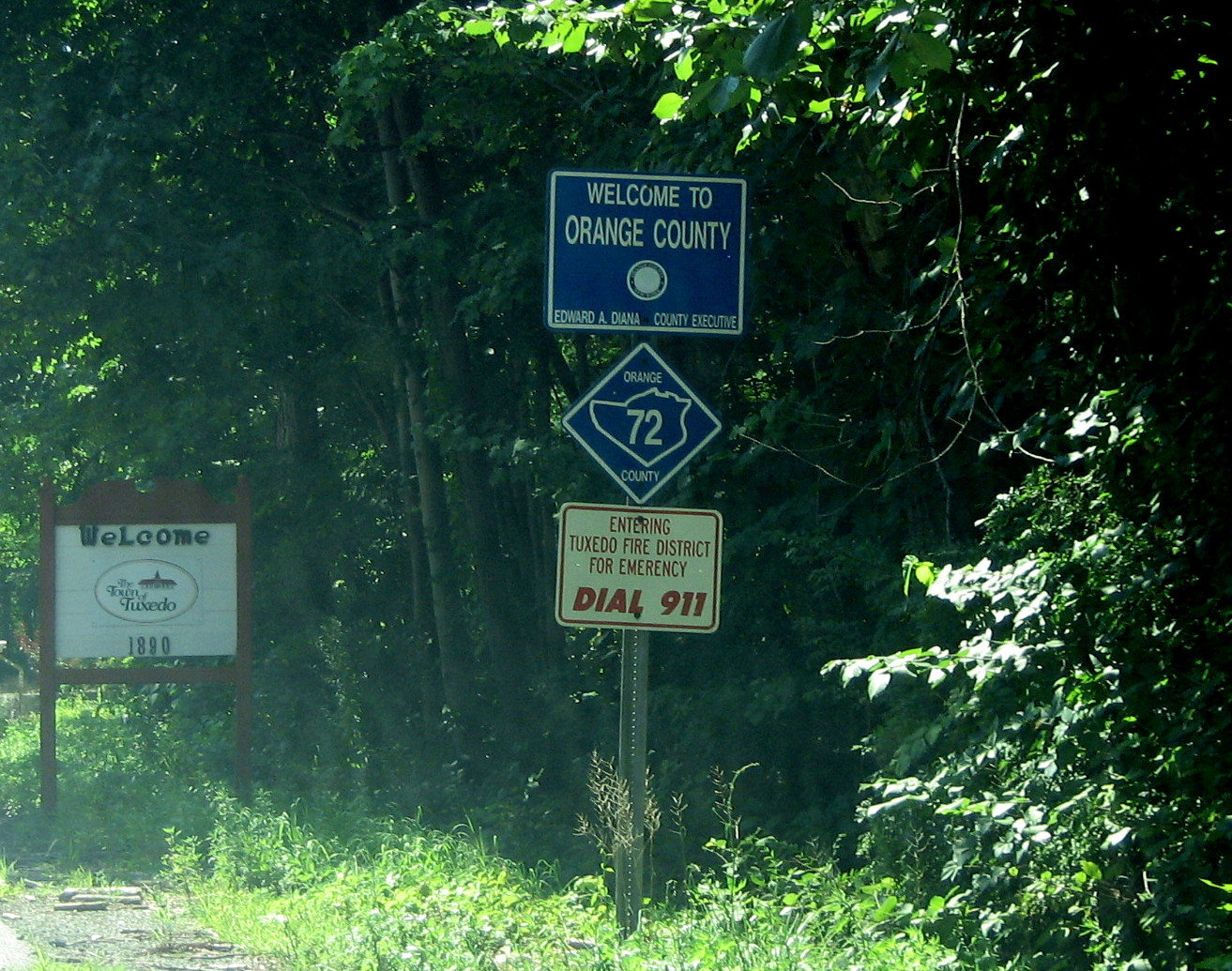
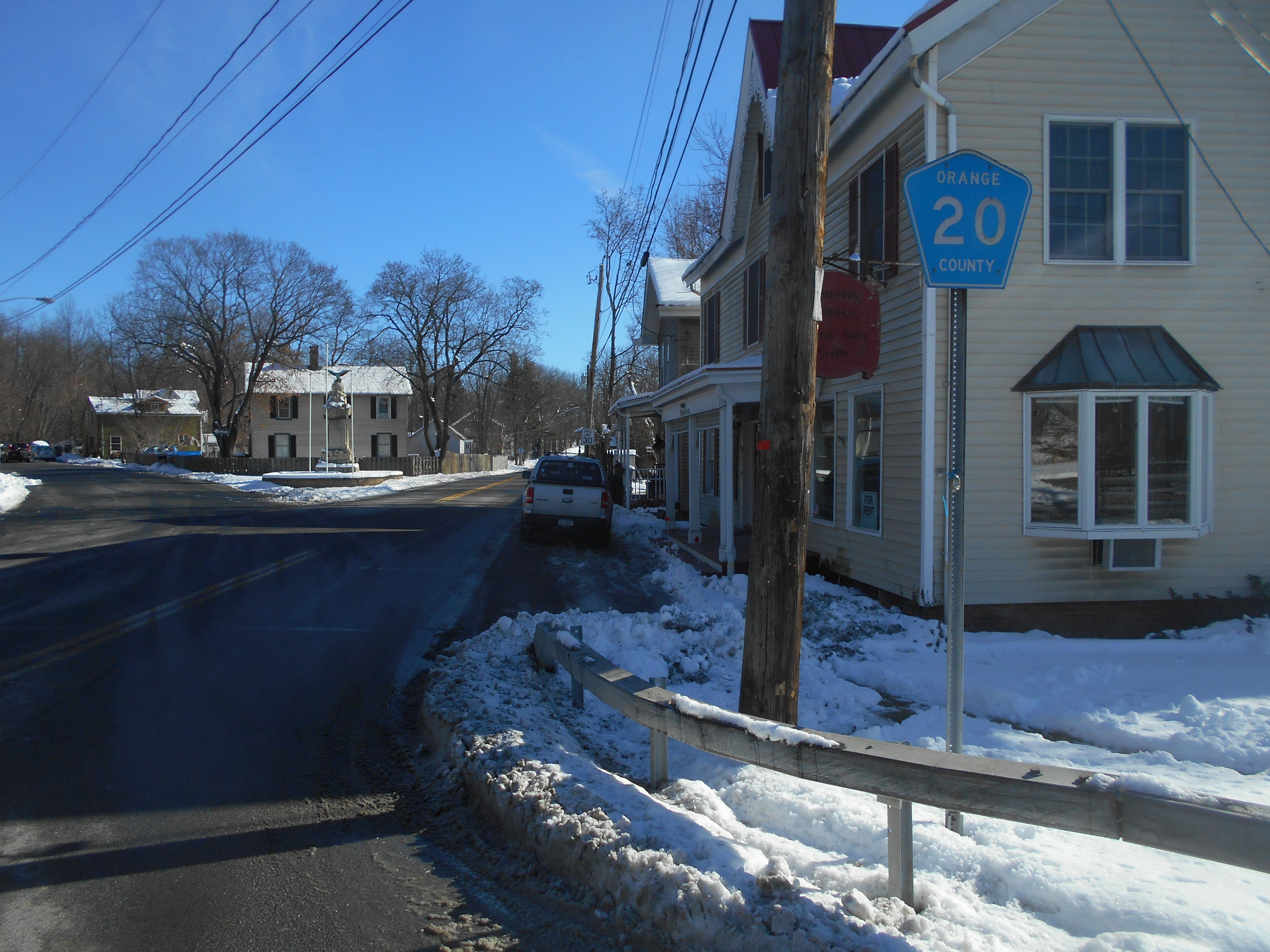
- The former and current standard route marker for county routes in Orange County.

Highway names
- Interstates: Interstate X (I-X)
- US Highways: U.S. Route X (US X)
- State: New York State Route X (NY X)
- County: County Route X (CR X)

System links
- New York Highways; Interstate; US; State; Reference; Parkways

County routes in Orange County, New York, are maintained by the Orange County Department of Public Works. Most routes are signed with the Manual on Uniform Traffic Control Devices-standard yellow-on-blue pentagon route marker; however, some routes are still signed with white-on-blue diamond-shaped route markers that predate the introduction of the standard marker. These markers are unique to Orange and Ulster Counties and display the route's designation inside an outline of the county. Route numbers are not assigned in any fixed pattern.

== Routes 1–50 ==
Route	Length (mi)	Length (km)	From	Via	To	Notes
CR 1	13.02	20.95	US 6 in Greenville	Pine Island Turnpike	CR 1A / CR 41 in Warwick	
CR 1A	3.31	5.33	CR 1 / CR 41		NY 94	
CR 1B	2.57	4.14	CR 41	Pine Island Turnpike in Warwick	Warwick village line	
CR 4	2.66	4.28	NY 207	Maybrook Road in Hamptonburgh	NY 208	
CR 5	8.96	14.42	NY 17A in Greenwood Lake	Dutch Hollow and Lakes roads	NY 17M in Monroe	
CR 6	7.88	12.68	CR 1 / CR 26 in Goshen	Pulaski Highway	NY 17A in Goshen	
CR 7	3.70	5.95	US 209	Oakland Valley in Deerpark	Sullivan County line (becomes CR 49)	
CR 8	6.76	10.88	NY 207 in Goshen	Sarah Wells Trail	NY 208 in Hamptonburgh	
CR 9	9.83	15.82	Norfolk Southern Railway bridge in Woodbury	Smith Clove, Mineral Springs, and Angola roads and Main Street	NY 218 in Cornwall	Part north of Quaker Avenue was formerly part of NY 307
CR 10			I-84 exit 36B	Union Avenue in Newburgh	NY 52	Transferred to state in 1980; now part of NY 300
CR 11	6.95	11.18	NY 211 in Otisville	Highland Avenue and Mount Hope Road	Middletown city line in Wallkill	
CR 12	7.77	12.50	CR 1 in Minisink	Lower Road	CR 50 / CR 56 in Wawayanda	
CR 13	8.08	13.00	Warwick village line in Warwick	Kings Highway	NY 17M in Chester	
CR 13A	1.00	1.61	CR 82	Sugar Loaf Bypass in Chester	CR 13	
CR 14	4.85	7.81	NY 17K	Old Albany Post Road in Montgomery	Ulster County line (becomes CR 9)	
CR 15	0.32	0.51	New Jersey state line (becomes NJ 23)	Clove Road in Deerpark	US 6	
CR 16	0.32	0.51	CR 521 at the New Jersey state line	Maple Avenue in Deerpark	Port Jervis city line	
CR 17	5.89	9.48	NY 302 / CR 48 in Crawford	Thompson Ridge Road	NY 52 in Montgomery	
CR 18	2.55	4.10	NY 211 in Wallkill	New Vernon Road	Sullivan County line in Mount Hope (becomes CR 62)	
CR 19	4.62	7.44	NY 17 in Tuxedo	Orange Turnpike	Monroe village line	Formerly included alignment of Still Road up to NY 17M and CR 40 in Monroe village.
CR 20	3.92	6.31	NY 94 in Blooming Grove	Orrs Mills Road	NY 32 in Cornwall	
CR 21	1.88	3.03	New Jersey state line	Warwick Turnpike in Warwick	NY 94	
CR 22	2.78	4.47	NY 284 in Minisink	South Centerville Road	US 6 in Wawayanda	
CR 23	6.06	9.75	NY 17K	Rockcut and Forest roads in Newburgh	Ulster County line (becomes CR 20)	
CR 24	2.89	4.65	CR 35 / CR 73	Guymard Turnpike in Mount Hope	CR 11	
CR 25	2.03	3.27	CR 6 in Goshen	Pumpkin Swamp and Meadow roads	NY 17A / NY 94 in Florida	
CR 26	3.04	4.89	New Jersey state line	Glenwood Road in Warwick	CR 1 / CR 6	
CR 27	5.09	8.19	NY 208 in South Blooming Grove	Clove Road	CR 20 in Blooming Grove	
CR 28			NY 52	Plattekill Turnpike and Union Avenue in New Windsor	NY 32	Transferred to state in 1980; now part of NY 300
CR 29	3.64	5.86	NY 17K in Montgomery	River Road and South Montgomery Street	NY 52 in Walden	
CR 31	2.80	4.51	CR 37 / CR 42	Maple Avenue in Goshen	US 6 / NY 17M	
CR 32	1.93	3.11	CR 107	Mill Street and Willow Avenue in Cornwall	CR 9	
CR 33	1.14	1.83	CR 8	Shea Road in Hamptonburgh	NY 207	
CR 34	0.88	1.42	NY 32	Trout Brook Road in Woodbury	CR 9	
CR 35	4.68	7.53	US 6 / CR 55 in Greenville	Mountain Road	CR 24 / CR 73 in Mount Hope	
CR 36	0.35	0.56	New Jersey state line	Unionville Road in Minisink	Unionville village line	
CR 37	2.07	3.33	CR 12 in Wawayanda	Maple Avenue	CR 31 / CR 42 in Goshen	
CR 38			NY 207 in New Windsor	Union Avenue	NY 17K in Newburgh	Transferred to state in 1980; now part of NY 300
CR 40	0.59	0.95	NY 17M / CR 19	Freeland Street in Monroe	CR 105	Decommissioned; alignment turned over to Monroe village.
CR 41	5.08	8.18	CR 1 / CR 1A in Warwick	Union Corners Road, Wheeler Road, Highland Avenue, and Bridge Street	NY 17A in Florida	
CR 42	1.12	1.80	CR 31 / CR 37	Cross Road in Goshen	CR 6	
CR 43	2.34	3.77	NY 17K	Collabar Road in Crawford	CR 17	
CR 44	4.75	7.64	NY 208 in South Blooming Grove	Mountain, Seven Springs, and Ridge roads	NY 32 in Woodbury	
CR 45	4.30	6.92	CR 5	Laroe Road in Chester	CR 13	
CR 47	4.53	7.29	CR 63 / CR 101 in Wallkill	Scotchtown Road	NY 17K in Crawford	
CR 48	2.76	4.44	Sullivan County line (becomes CR 66)	Thompson Ridge–Sullivan County Line Road in Crawford	NY 302 / CR 17	
CR 49	4.07	6.55	US 6 in Wallkill	Wawayanda Avenue	Middletown city line in Wawayanda	
CR 50	2.93	4.72	CR 12 / CR 56 in Wawayanda	Golf Links Road	CR 67 in Wallkill	

== Routes 51 and up ==
Route	Length (mi)	Length (km)	From	Via	To	Notes
CR 51	8.20	13.20	NY 17M in Blooming Grove	Craigville, Hulsetown, and Hamptonburgh roads	CR 8 in Hamptonburgh	
CR 52	1.76	2.83	CR 17 / CR 89	Hill Road in Montgomery	CR 14	
CR 53	2.84	4.57	NY 207 in Hamptonburgh	Stony Ford Road	NY 211 in Wallkill	
CR 54			NY 207 in New Windsor	Drury Lane	NY 17K in Montgomery	Former number; replaced by NY 747 south of I-84
CR 55	3.08	4.96	New Jersey state line	Smith Corners in Greenville	US 6 / CR 35	
CR 56	2.11	3.40	US 6	Davis Highway in Wawayanda	CR 12 / CR 50	
CR 59			NY 32 / NY 94	Temple Hill Road in New Windsor	NY 207	Transferred to state in 1980; now part of NY 300
CR 60	2.76	4.44	CR 11	Tally Ho Road in Mount Hope	NY 211	
CR 61	1.93	3.11	NY 211	Otisville Road in Deerpark	Sullivan County line (becomes CR 163)	
CR 62	2.77	4.46	CR 12	Caddigans Corners–Gardnerville Road in Minisink	NY 284	
CR 63	1.21	1.95	NY 211	Blumel Road in Wallkill	CR 47 / CR 101	
CR 64	1.92	3.09	CR 105 in Monroe	Dunderberg Road	NY 32 in Woodbury	
CR 65	0.91	1.46	NY 32	Angola Road in Cornwall	CR 9	
CR 66	4.71	7.58	NY 207 in Goshen	Craigville and Division roads	CR 51 in Blooming Grove	
CR 67	2.11	3.40	Middletown city line	East Main Street in Wallkill	NY 17 exit 122	
CR 68	0.89	1.43	CR 6	Orange Farm Road in Goshen	NY 17A	
CR 69	2.97	4.78	NY 300	Union Avenue in New Windsor	US 9W	
CR 70	1.47	2.37	US 6 in Wawayanda	Eatontown Road	CR 94 in Greenville	Formerly included Castle High Road in Wawayanda, but Orange County removed the section in 1973.
CR 71	2.01	3.23	CR 19	Harriman Heights Road in Monroe	NY 17M	
CR 72	1.66	2.67	New Jersey state line	Sterling Mine Road in Tuxedo	Rockland County line (becomes CR 72)	
CR 73	3.66	5.89	CR 24 / CR 35 in Mount Hope	Mountain Road and Seybolt Avenue	CR 11 in Otisville	
CR 74	1.41	2.27	NY 94	Forge Hill Road in New Windsor	US 9W	
CR 75	2.96	4.76	NY 17K in Montgomery	Coldenham Road and Coldenham Avenue	NY 208 in Walden	
CR 76	3.62	5.83	NY 17M at former NY 17 exit 118A	Bloomingburg Road in Wallkill	Sullivan County line	Former routing of NY 17
CR 77	1.78	2.86	CR 8	Egbertson Road in Hamptonburgh	NY 207	
CR 78	2.45	3.94	Dolson Avenue (NY 17M), in Middletown	Middletown Cutoff Road	NY 211 in Wallkill	Continues north as Ingrassia Road
CR 79	2.00	3.22	NY 32	Pleasant Hill Road in Cornwall	CR 20	
CR 80	4.52	7.27	Port Jervis city line	Neversink Drive in Deerpark	US 209	
CR 81			CR 35	Mullock Road in Greenville	CR 70	Orange County removed CR 81 from the system in 1973.
CR 82	3.43	5.52	CR 13	Bellvale and Gibson Hill roads in Chester	CR 45	
CR 83	4.76	7.66	NY 207 in Goshen	Scotchtown Avenue	NY 211 / CR 101 in Wallkill	
CR 84	7.91	12.73	CR 72 in Tuxedo	Sterling Lake and Long Meadow roads	NY 17A in Tuxedo	
CR 85	2.16	3.48	NY 52	South St. Andrews Road and Plains Road in Montgomery	Ulster County line (becomes CR 21)	
CR 86	4.08	6.57	NY 32	Fostertown Road in Newburgh	US 9W	
CR 88	2.70	4.35	New Jersey state line	Liberty Corners Road in Warwick	CR 1	
CR 89	2.31	3.72	NY 52	Hill Road in Crawford	CR 17 / CR 52	
CR 90	2.76	4.44	NY 211 in Otisville	Sanitarium Road	Sullivan County line in Mount Hope (becomes CR 65)	
CR 91	3.72	5.99	Tuxedo town line	West Mombasha Road in Monroe	CR 5	
CR 92	0.83	1.34	CR 67	Dunning Road in Wallkill	NY 211	
CR 93	3.49	5.62	CR 12	Lime Kiln Road in Wawayanda	US 6	
CR 94	3.74	6.02	CR 70 in Greenville	Greenville Turnpike	CR 24 in Mount Hope	
CR 95	1.23	1.98	CR 64	Dunderberg Road Extension in Woodbury	NY 32	
CR 96	0.90	1.45	CR 67	Carpenter Avenue in Wallkill	NY 211	
CR 99	3.16	5.09	NY 416	Neelytown Road in Montgomery	NY 208	
CR 100	1.07	1.72	CR 31	Gibson Road in Goshen	NY 17A	
CR 101	3.98	6.41	NY 211 / CR 83	Goshen Turnpike in Wallkill	NY 302	
CR 105	3.23	5.20	Monroe town line	North Main and Spring streets and Bakertown and Highland roads	NY 32 in Woodbury	Formerly part of NY 208; in two sections separated by Monroe village.
CR 106	5.20	8.37	NY 17 / NY 17A	Kanawauke Road in Tuxedo	Rockland County line (becomes CR 106)	Formerly part of NY 210; decommissioned on January 1, 2014 when maintenance was traded to the Palisades Interstate Park Commission. As of August 2018, CR 106 signs remain posted at NY 17 / NY 17A according to the Google Street View images.
CR 107	0.51	0.82	NY 32	Quaker Avenue in Cornwall	US 9W	Formerly part of NY 307
CR 108	0.55	0.89	CR 67	Schutt Road Extension in Wallkill	CR 92	

== See also ==
- County routes in New York

== Bibliography ==
- Orange County Legislature (1973). Proceedings of the County Legislature, County of Orange, in Regular Session. Orange County, New York.
