= John I. Crawford Farm =

Historic barn in New York

- John I Crawford Farm
- U.S. National Register of Historic Places
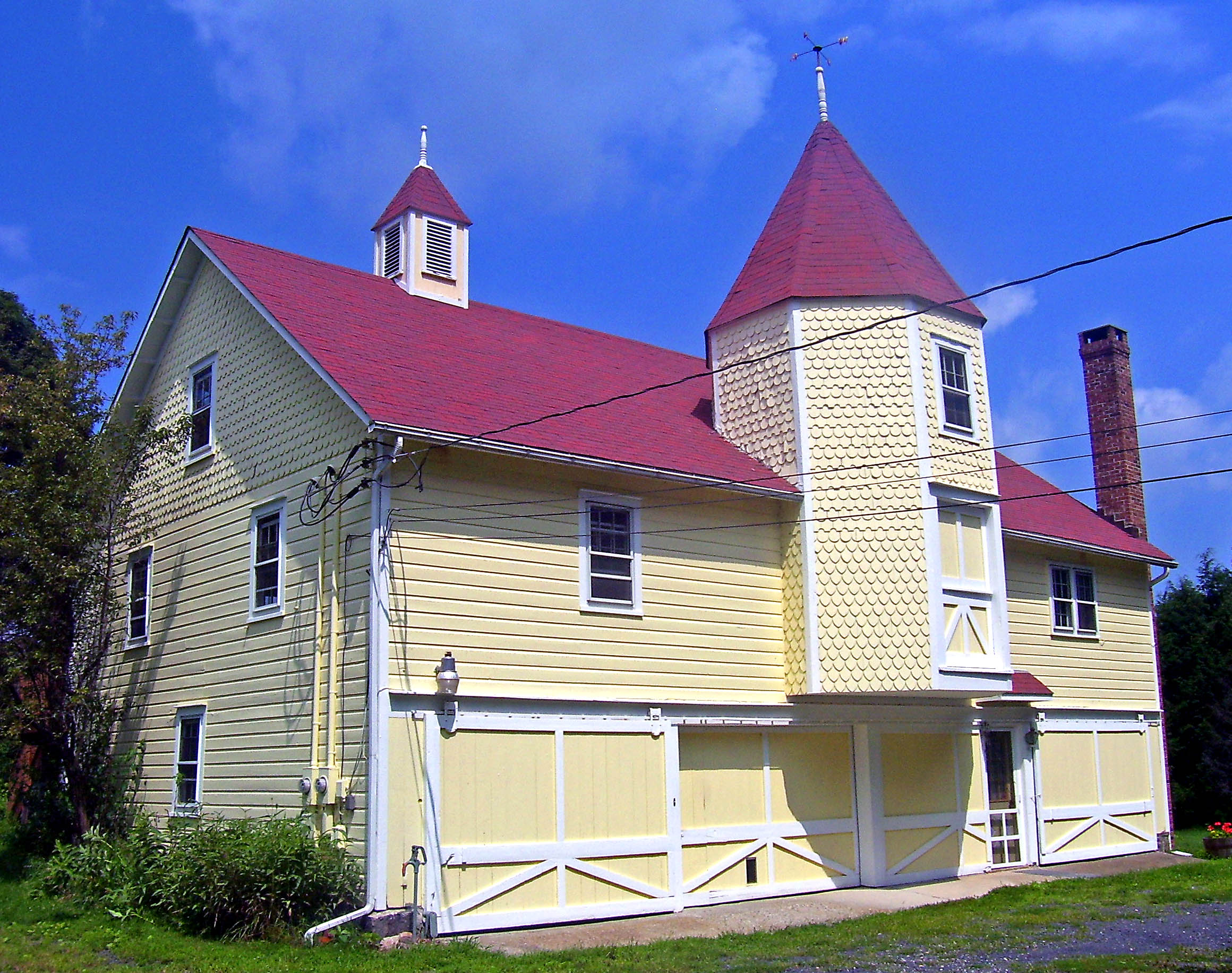
- Victorian barn built in late 19th century, seen here in 2007

- Location within New York Location within the United States
- Location: NY 302, 1 mi. NE of jct. of NY 302 and Thompson Ridge Rd., Thompson Ridge, NY
- Nearest city: Middletown
- Coordinates: 41°34′35″N 74°19′49″W
- Area: 12.7 acres (5.1 ha)
- Built: 1780
- Architectural style: Federal, Victorian
- NRHP reference No.: 98001000
- Added to NRHP: August 6, 1998

The John I. Crawford Farm, also Hopewell Farm, is located on NY 302 in the Thompson Ridge section of the Town of Crawford in Orange County, New York, United States. It has been on the National Register of Historic Places since 1998.

Crawford, whose family lends its name to the town, settled the region and began building the farm around 1780. The property's main house was built not long afterwards, in the Federal style. A century later, in 1890, the bright yellow outbuildings of the property were updated in a Victorian style. The Crawford family cemetery lies to the southwest.
