= Silver Lake, New York =

Silver Lake, New York may refer to:

- Silver Lake, Clinton County, New York - a lake in Clinton County, New York
- Silver Lake, Orange County, New York - a lake in town of Wallkill, New York
- Silver Lake, Otsego County, New York - a hamlet in the town of Pittsfield, New York
- Silver Lake Institute - a community in the town of Castile, New York, sometimes referred to as just Silver Lake
- Silver Lake (Wyoming County, New York) - a lake in Wyoming County
- Silver Lake, Staten Island - a neighborhood in Staten Island, New York
- Silver Lake (Woodridge, New York) - a lake in Sullivan County
