= New York State Route 17M =

State highway in Orange County, New York, US

New York State Route 17M
- Map of Orange County and vicinity with NY 17M highlighted in red

Route information
- Auxiliary route of NY 17
- Maintained by NYSDOT and the city of Middletown
- Length: 26.63 mi (42.86 km)
- Existed: September 1950–present

Major junctions
- West end: CR 76 in Wallkill
- NY 302 in Wallkill; NY 211 in Middletown; US 6 in Middletown; I-84 in Middletown; Future I-86 / US 6 / NY 17 / NY 17A / NY 207 in Goshen; Future I-86 / US 6 / NY 17 / NY 94 in Chester; NY 208 in Monroe
- East end: NY 17 in Harriman

Location
- Country: United States
- State: New York
- Counties: Orange

Highway system
- New York Highways; Interstate; US; State; Reference; Parkways
← NY 17K	→ NY 18

New York State Route 17M (NY 17M) is an east–west state highway in Orange County, New York, in the United States. It extends for 26.63 miles (42.86 km) from west of the city of Middletown to what is currently the north–south section of NY 17 just southeast of the village of Harriman. It is a busy main street in Middletown and the village of Monroe; in the former, it divides into a parkway for several blocks and forms the city's major commercial strip, located between the downtown district and an interchange with Interstate 84 (I-84). The rest of the road is a two-lane rural route. Between New Hampton and Goshen, the highway overlaps with U.S. Route 6 (US 6). The easternmost section of that overlap near Goshen is routed on the Quickway, making a three-route concurrency with NY 17.

Most of NY 17M follows the course used by NY 17 prior to the construction of the Quickway through the Catskill Mountains. The first section of the Quickway opened in 1951 and extended from Fair Oaks to Goshen. NY 17M was initially assigned in September 1950 to NY 17's old surface routing between Fair Oaks and Middletown; however, it was extended east to Harriman and, for a brief time, northwest to Wurtsboro as more sections of the freeway were completed.

== Route description ==
The portions of NY 17M that lie north and east of the city of Middletown are maintained by the New York State Department of Transportation (NYSDOT). Within the Middletown city limits, NY 17M is city-maintained.

=== Wallkill and Middletown ===
County Route 76 (CR 76) becomes NY 17M when the highway passes through the site of a former interchange (once exit 118A) with the nearby Quickway (NY 17) in the town of Wallkill, located in northern Orange County. The junction was just north of the former right-of-way of the New York, Ontario and Western Railway, which NY 17M crosses as it makes its way southward over some gentle, lightly developed hills. After 0.5 miles (0.8 km), the road reaches a signalized intersection with NY 302, its first junction with another state highway. The junction currently serves as NY 302's southern terminus; however, NY 302 once continued south to Middletown by way of an overlap with NY 17M. Continuing on, NY 17M traverses increasingly developed areas, passing through the hamlet of Rockville on its way to the densely populated neighborhood of Washington Heights, situated just outside Middletown.

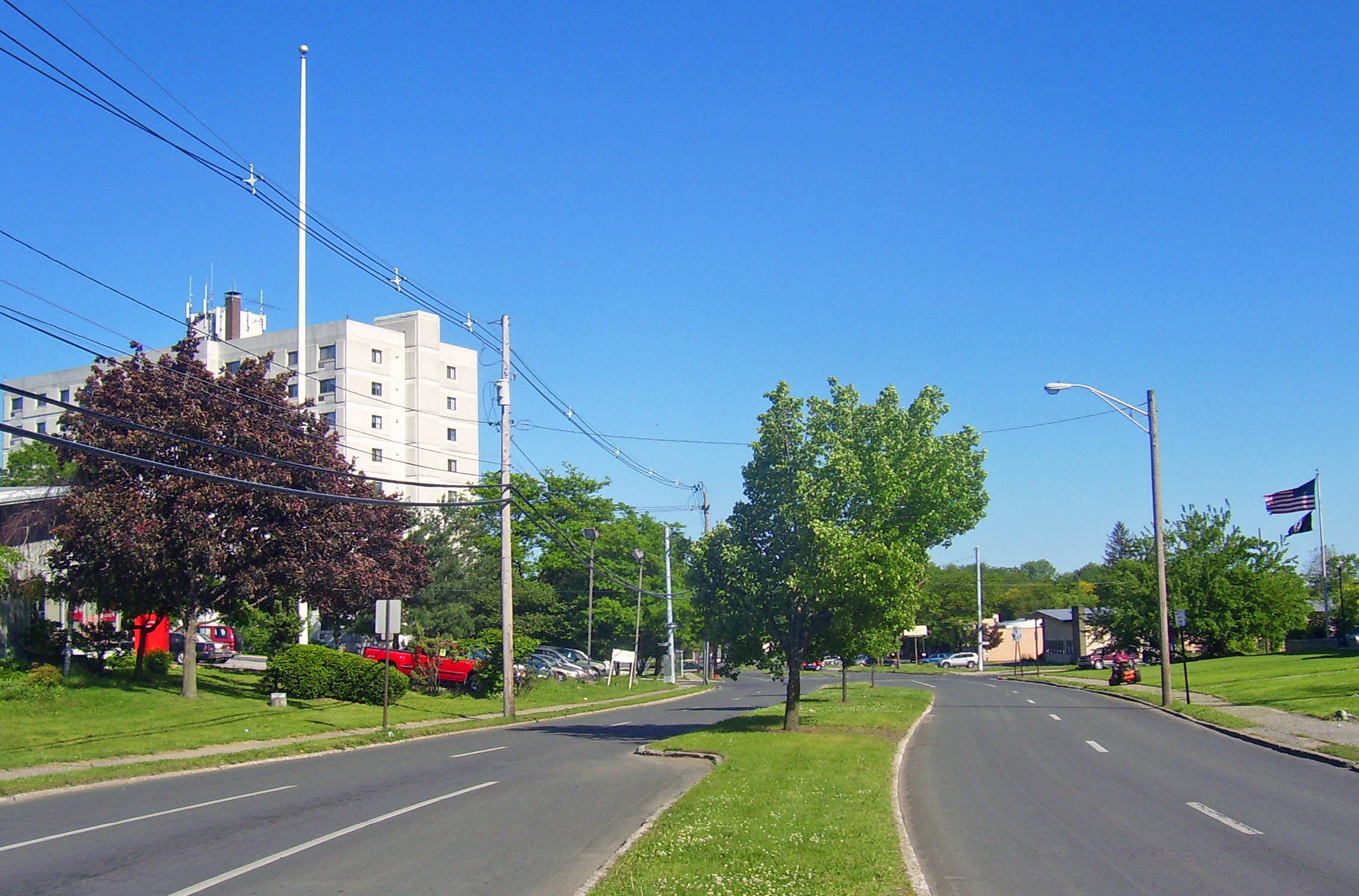
Fulton Avenue parkway in Middletown

The route seamlessly passes from Washington Heights to Middletown, where it becomes known as North Street. The street is initially fairly wide—featuring shoulders on each side—but it narrows in the residential neighborhoods closer to the city's center. Upon reaching the northern edge of Middletown's central business district, the route turns right onto Wickham Avenue, which carries NY 211 through northern Middletown. The resulting overlap between NY 17M and NY 211 is a wrong-way concurrency: NY 17M eastbound is concurrent with NY 211 westbound and vice versa. NY 17M and NY 211 head west along the fringe of downtown, climbing slightly in elevation as the street passes through mostly residential areas. After seven blocks, Wickham Avenue merges into West Main Street; however, the road's surroundings remain unchanged.

NY 17M and NY 211 continue along West Main Street for another four blocks, traversing a slight westerly turn in the street prior to intersecting Monhagen Avenue in the western part of the city. Both routes leave Main Street here: NY 211 turns right, following the road northwest toward Otisville while NY 17M heads left, proceeding southeastward toward downtown. It continues through a six-block commercial and residential area to Mill Street, at which point Monhagen Avenue becomes Fulton Street and expands to become a parkway with a tree-lined median strip. This stretch continues for five blocks along the southern edge of downtown Middletown to Academy Avenue, where NY 17M turns right and heads southward. After just two blocks, the route changes streets for the final time in Middletown, veering left onto Dolson Avenue.

=== East of Middletown ===
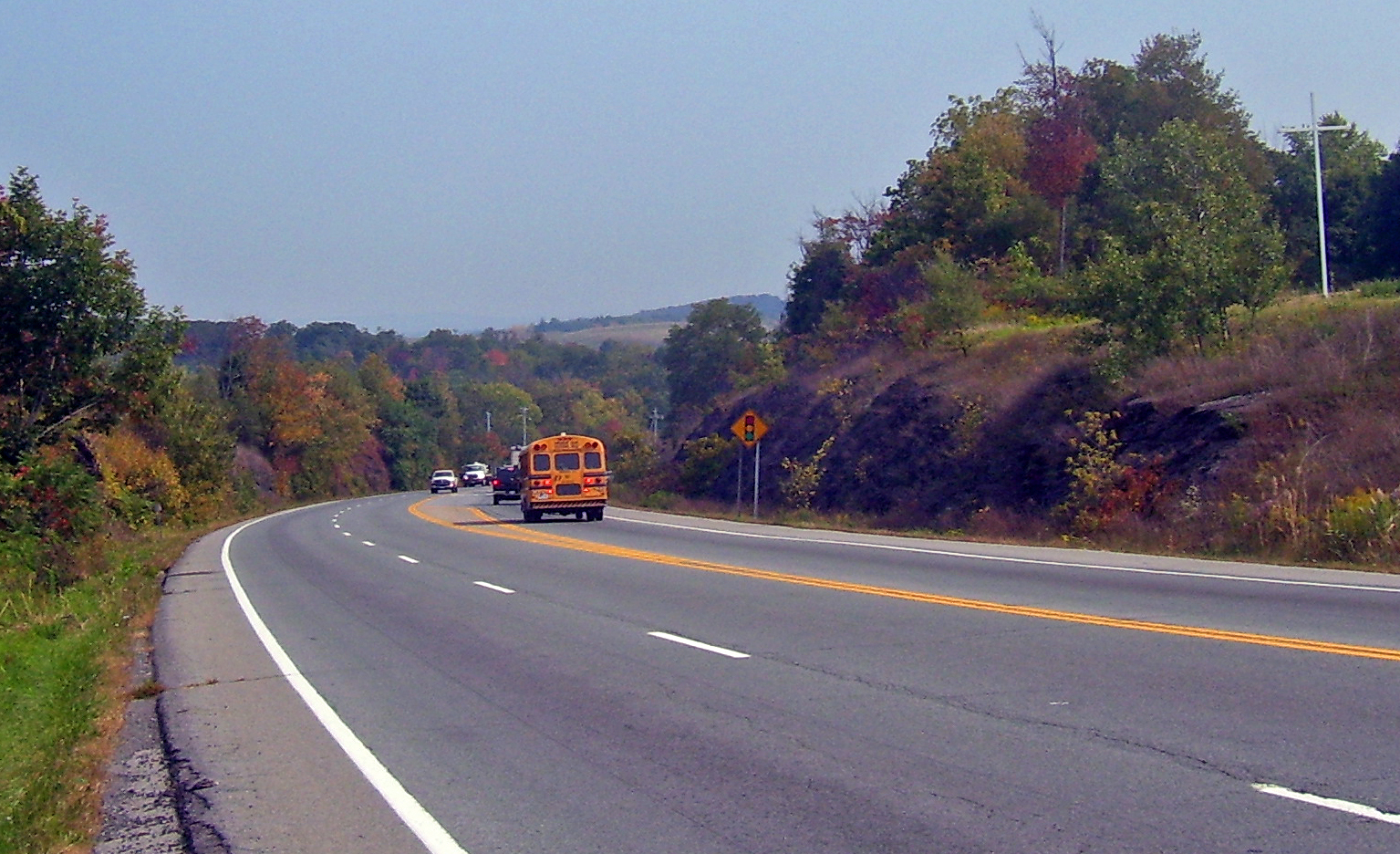
Descent to the Wallkill

As Dolson Avenue, NY 17M passes by a single residential block before entering a linear commercial district that follows the highway to an interchange with I-84 roughly 1.5 miles (2.4 km) to the south. The route initially remains two lanes wide, but widens to four lanes after crossing the Middletown and New Jersey Railway at-grade. This stretch of NY 17M also features a center left-turn lane to accommodate the traffic turning into the many commercial plazas on either side. The road remains within the Middletown city limits until a block before the intersection where US 6 comes in from the west and joins NY 17M. Together, they cross over I-84 at exit 3, providing access to the cities of Port Jervis and Newburgh in the western and eastern parts of the county, respectively.

Just past I-84, the Wawayanda hamlet of New Hampton begins, with car dealerships and other commercial establishments on either side. The road narrows to two lanes as the combined highways begin a slow, gentle descent through less developed areas to the bridge over the Wallkill River, situated at the northern tip of the county's Black Dirt Region. Short sections of the approach on either side add a passing lane in the uphill direction. The river marks the Goshen town line, and the slight climb out of the river depression is accompanied again with some extra lanes. Past the climb, development aside the road picks up slightly, although most of the land around the highway remains undeveloped as open fields or forests. US 6 and NY 17M continue to the western outskirts of the village of Goshen, where they merge into NY 17 at exit 123.

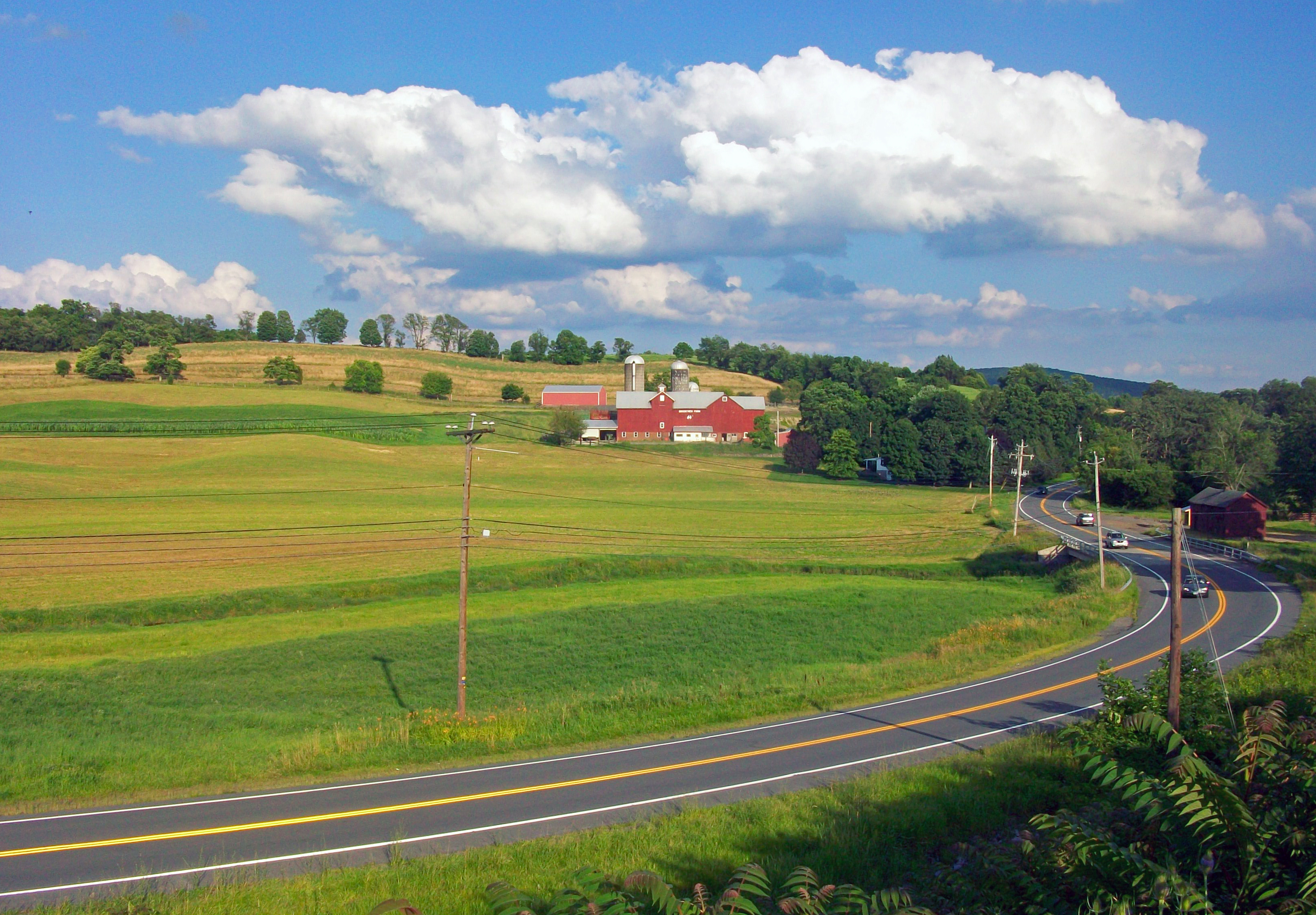
Rural scenes in Chester

NY 17M follows the Quickway for about 1 mile (1.6 km), before exiting at an interchange (exit 124) and meeting NY 17A and NY 207 in a commercialized area southwest of the center of Goshen. Though signage still exists eastbound on the Quickway for the old exit 125 directing NY 17M to exit there, this interchange no longer services NY 17M. From here to the village of Chester, NY 17M closely follows the NY 17 freeway, serving a handful of homes in an otherwise undeveloped area adjacent to the Quickway. In Chester, NY 17M becomes Brookside Avenue and intersects with NY 94 in the commercial center of the community. It continues on, passing through the rural areas of the southern portion of the town of Blooming Grove prior to becoming heavily developed as it passes into the town of Monroe.

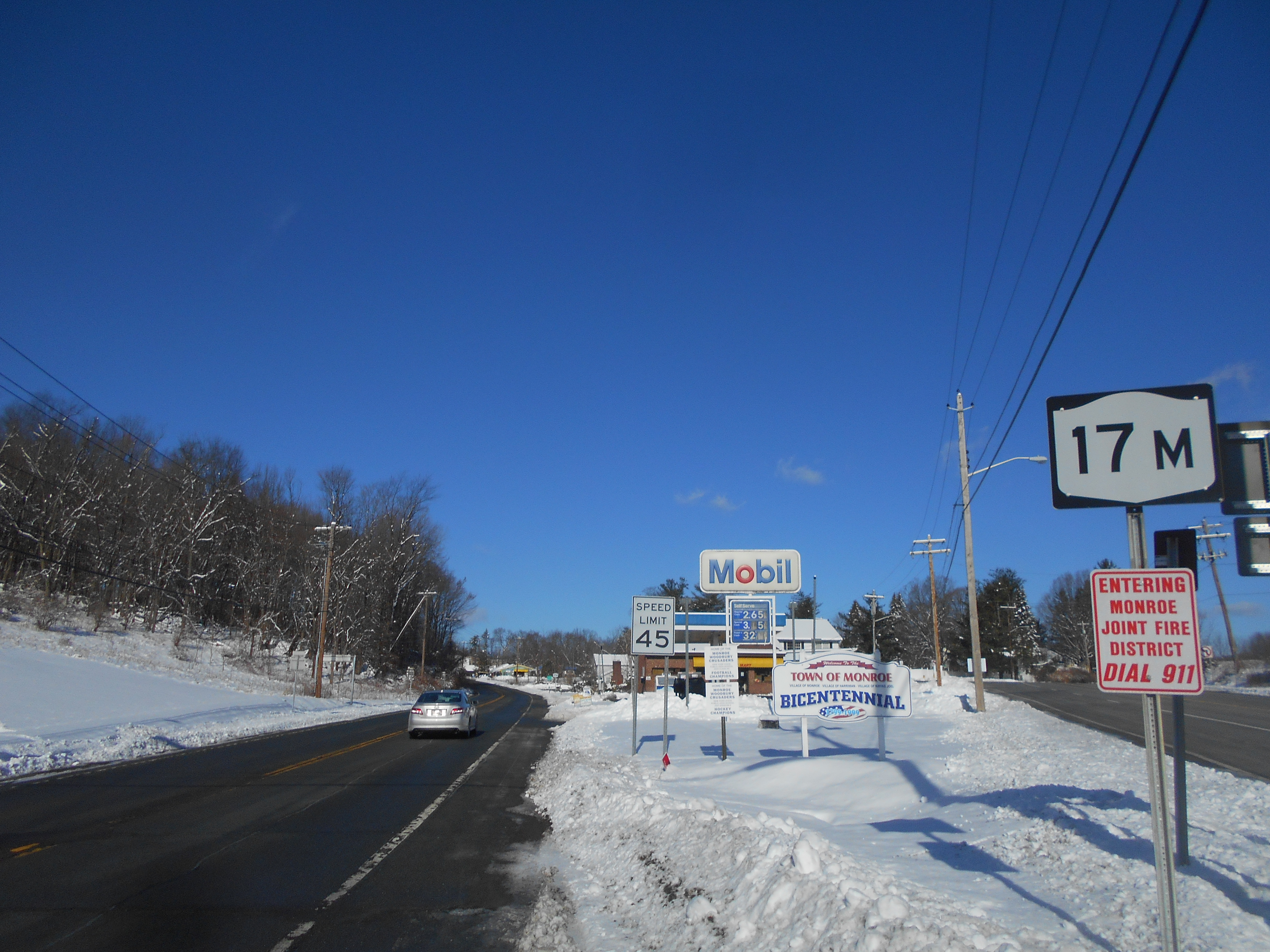
NY 17M running west from NY 17 in Woodbury

Just inside the town line, NY 17M turns southward, leaving the vicinity of the Quickway and entering the village of Monroe. It bypasses the downtown portion of the village and its historic district to the west and south. Despite this fact, it still serves as one of the community's major commercial strips, intersecting NY 208 in a built-up area due west of downtown. The route continues to the east, serving commercial and residential areas on its way to the nearby village of Harriman. Development abates slightly past Harriman as NY 17M continues with a slight southward bent towards its final junction with NY 17 just outside the Harriman village limits in the town and village of Woodbury.

== History ==
=== Origins and designation ===
What is now NY 17M was originally designated as part of Route 4 by the New York State Legislature in 1908. The unsigned legislative route extended across the Southern Tier of New York, beginning near the shores of Lake Erie in Westfield and ending at the Hudson River in Highland Falls. The first set of posted routes in New York were assigned in 1924, at which time most of legislative Route 4 was designated as NY 17. While Route 4 went northeast from Harriman, NY 17 continued south from the village toward the New Jersey state line.

In the late 1940s, construction began on the Quickway, a limited-access highway connecting Binghamton to Harriman by way of the NY 17 corridor. The first portion to be built was the section between exit 118A in Fair Oaks and exit 123 near Goshen, which opened to traffic in September 1950. NY 17 was subsequently realigned to bypass Middletown to the northeast on the new freeway while the former routing of NY 17 between US 6 south of Middletown and the new Fair Oaks interchange was redesignated as NY 17M. The remainder of old NY 17 from Middletown to Goshen remained part of US 6, which had overlapped with NY 17 between Middletown and Goshen. On December 1, 1955, the section between Goshen and Harriman was designated as an extension of NY 17M with the realignment of NY 17 and US 6 onto the Quickway.

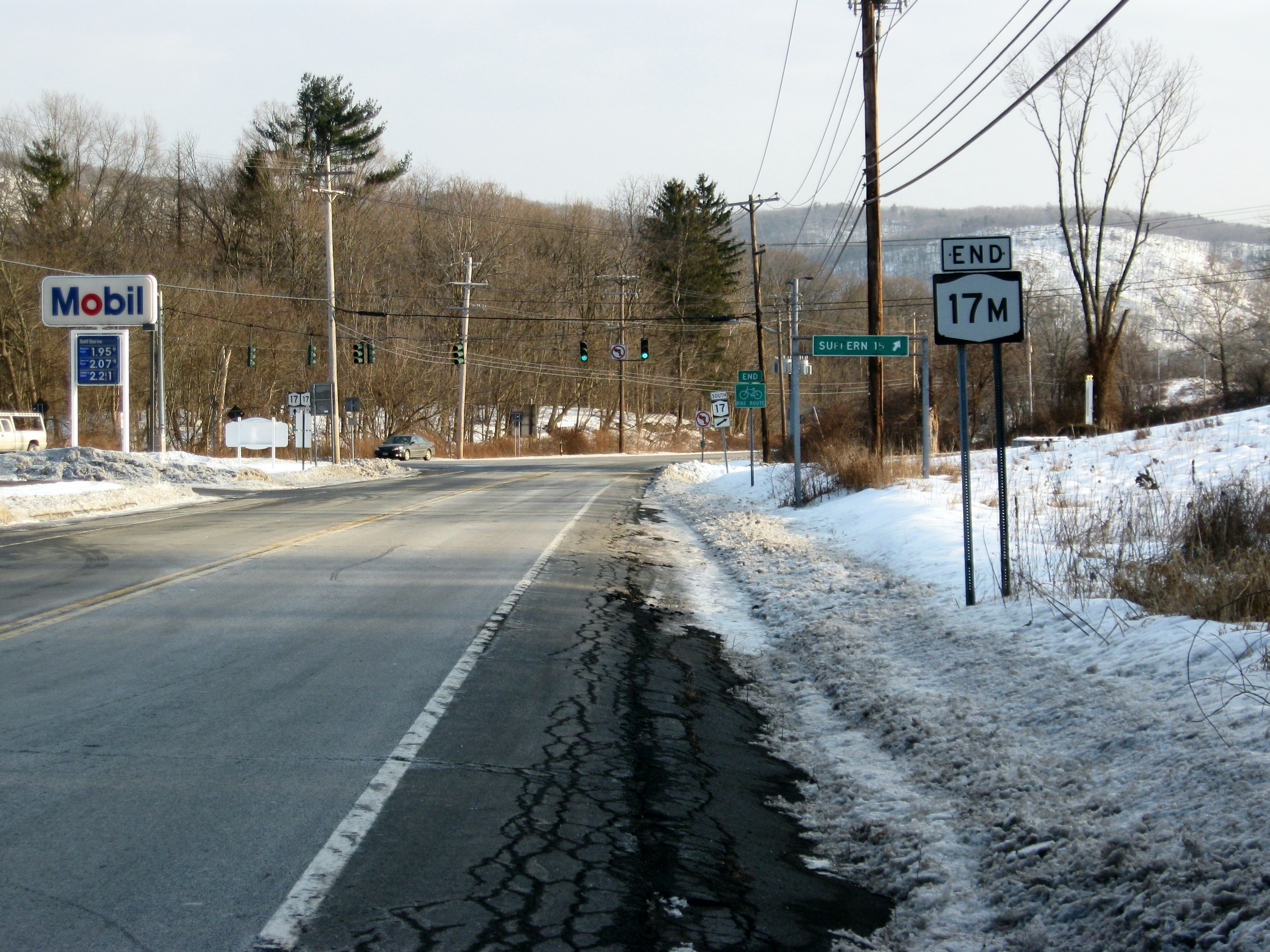
NY 17M's eastern terminus at NY 17 in Harriman

The Goshen–Chester and Chester–Harriman segments of the Quickway were completed in October 1954 and August 1955, respectively, creating a continuous limited-access highway between Fair Oaks and the New York State Thruway. US 6 and NY 17 were moved onto the highway as sections opened to traffic, while NY 17M was extended eastward along NY 17's old routing to Harriman following the completion of the Quickway between Chester and the Thruway. On October 23, 1958, the portion of the Quickway between Fair Oaks and Wurtsboro (exit 114) was completed as part of a realigned NY 17. The former surface routing of NY 17 between the two locations initially became part of NY 17M; however, this extension was eliminated in the late 1960s.

=== Realignments and ramp closures ===
NY 17M originally followed a slightly different alignment through downtown Middletown. When the route was first assigned, it continued south from Wickham Avenue on North Street, proceeding into what was then the main commercial hub of the city. The highway rejoined its modern alignment at the intersection of South Street and Fulton Street south of downtown. In 1969, the city of Middletown began planning a project that would rehabilitate part of North Street. As part of the project, the section of North Street between Orchard Street and Main Street would be closed to traffic and converted into a pedestrian mall. The street was closed in early 1970, forcing NY 17M to be realigned onto Wickham Avenue, West Main Street, and Monhagen Avenue. The pedestrian mall project faced opposition from business owners, leading to its cancellation on February 9, 1970. North Street was reopened one day later; however, the rerouting of NY 17M proved to be permanent.

When the Quickway was first built, exit 118A was made up of two ramps, one leading from NY 17 eastbound to NY 17M and another connecting NY 17M westbound to NY 17 westbound. The exit was eliminated at some point after 1996. The westbound on-ramp was converted into a residential street known as Sands Road West while the eastbound half of the exit was completely removed. As a result, NY 17M's western terminus is no longer at an intersecting road. Instead, the highway simply changes from a state highway to a county road at the former site of the exit.

In December 2020, NYSDOT completed construction of a new exit 125, which was built to accommodate the new Legoland New York. As a result, the ramps of the previous exit 125 were closed in October 2020, creating a discontinuity in the route that still exists as of March 2025. The closest exit to the former routing is exit 124.

== Major intersections ==
NY 17M has exit numbers for the duration of its concurrency with the Quickway (New York State Route 17 and future Interstate 86). The entire route is in Orange County.

Location	mi	km	Exit	Destinations	Notes
Wallkill	0.00	0.00		CR 76 north (Bloomingburg Road) – Bloomingburg	Western terminus; southern terminus of CR 76; hamlet of Fair Oaks
Wallkill	1.12	1.80		NY 302 north – Circleville	Southern terminus of NY 302; hamlet of Rockdale
Middletown	3.96	6.37		NY 211 east (Wickham Avenue) – Montgomery	Western end of NY 211 concurrency
Middletown	4.74	7.63		NY 211 west (Monhagen Avenue) – Cuddebackville	Eastern end of NY 211 concurrency
Wawayanda	7.04	11.33		US 6 west – Slate Hill	Western end of US 6 concurrency
Wawayanda	7.42	11.94		I-84 – Newburgh, Port Jervis	Exit 15 on I-84
Village of Goshen	12.20	19.63	Western end of freeway section		
Village of Goshen	12.20	19.63	123	Future I-86 west / NY 17 west – Monticello	Westbound exit and eastbound entrance; western end of Future I-86/NY 17 concurrency
Village of Goshen	12.59	20.26	124	Future I-86 east / US 6 east / NY 17 east / NY 17A east / NY 207 east – Florida, Goshen, Chester	Eastern end of Future I-86/US 6/NY 17 concurrency; western termini of NY 17A and NY 207
Village of Goshen	12.59	20.26	Eastern end of freeway section		
Village of Chester	17.40	28.00		Future I-86 / US 6 / NY 17 / NY 94 – Florida, Washingtonville	Exit 126 on NY 17
Town of Chester	19.20	30.90		Future I-86 east / US 6 east / NY 17 east	
Village of Monroe	23.04	37.08		NY 208 north – Washingtonville	Southern terminus of NY 208
Harriman	26.63	42.86		NY 17 – Suffern	Eastern terminus
1.000 mi = 1.609 km; 1.000 km = 0.621 mi: Concurrency terminus; Incomplete access
