= New York State Route 17K =

State highway in New York, US

New York State Route 17K
- Map of Orange County in southeastern New York with NY 17K highlighted in red

Route information
- Auxiliary route of NY 17
- Maintained by NYSDOT and the city of Newburgh
- Length: 22.37 mi (36.00 km)
- History: Designated NY 215 in 1930; renumbered to NY 17K in March 1939

Major junctions
- West end: Future I-86 / NY 17 in Wallkill
- I-84 in Newburgh town
- East end: US 9W / NY 32 in Newburgh city

Location
- Country: United States
- State: New York
- Counties: Orange

Highway system
- New York Highways; Interstate; US; State; Reference; Parkways
← NY 17J	→ NY 17M

New York State Route 17K (NY 17K) is an east–west state highway located entirely within Orange County, New York, in the United States. It extends for 22.01 miles (35.42 km) from an intersection with NY 17 east of Bloomingburg to a junction with U.S. Route 9W (US 9W) midway across the city of Newburgh. The western terminus was where NY 17K originally connected to its parent route, NY 17; it now meets NY 17 a short distance to the east at an interchange with the Quickway. In Newburgh, NY 17K becomes Broadway and serves as the city's primary east–west street. The road can be divided into a half west of Montgomery, where it runs through relatively undeveloped land, and an eastern half where it closely parallels Interstate 84 (I-84) and serves much more populated areas.

The route follows the path of the Newburgh and Cochecton Turnpike, a 19th-century toll road extending from Newburgh to Cochecton. Most of the turnpike was taken over by the state of New York in the early 20th century, and the part east of Montgomery became the northernmost section of NY 8 in 1924. In the 1930 renumbering of state highways in New York, this segment of NY 8 became the basis for New York State Route 215, a new route that continued west from Montgomery to Bloomingburg. NY 215 was redesignated as NY 17K in March 1939.

== Route description ==
=== West of Newburgh ===
NY 17K's western terminus is at NY 17 at an interchange with the Quickway before heading roughly eastward into the town of Crawford. While it goes up and down some gentle hills to the first traffic light, the route intersects the six-way intersection with NY 302 (also the Long Path hiking trail) that serves as downtown Bullville. The direction of the highway remains unchanged as it continues past several horse farms and Winding Hills Park on its way to the town of Montgomery.

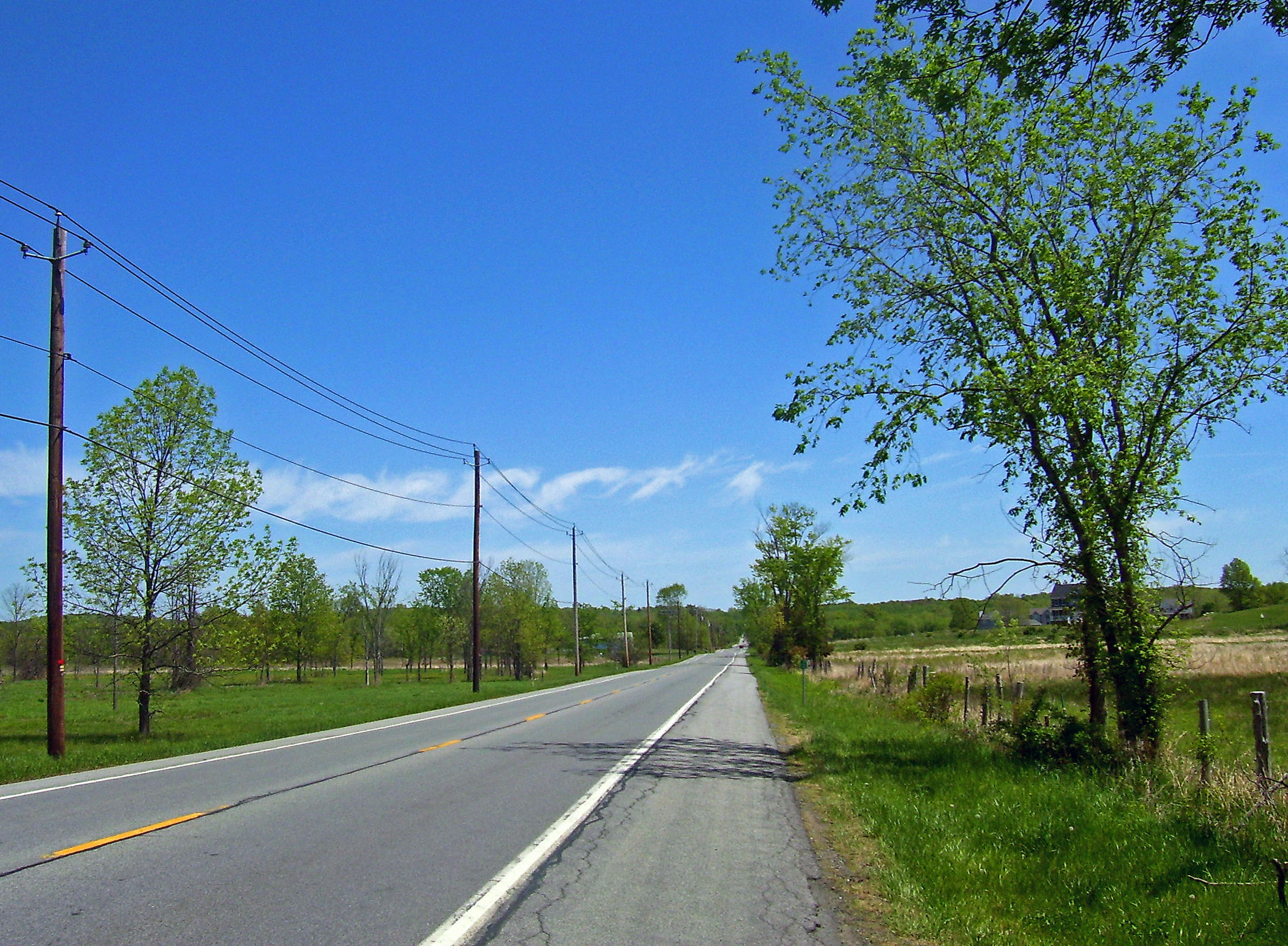
NY 17K in rural countryside east of Bullville

Shortly after crossing the flood-prone Muddy Kill, it reaches Ward's Bridge, where it crosses the Wallkill River and enters the village of Montgomery on Bridge Street, where it immediately passes the historic homes that line the street. The portion within the village is rather short, although consequential enough to include the traffic light at the northern end of NY 211 (Union Street). For the next two blocks, to Wallkill Avenue, the highway marks the northern boundary of Montgomery's other federally designated historic district, Academy Hill. Just before the village's eastern boundary, it passes between two more Registered Historic Places, the Patchett House and Montgomery Water Works.

After the village, it passes the combined building of Valley Central High School and Valley Central Middle School. The growing population of the area has added more traffic to the highway in recent years, forcing the school board to increase the stagger between the two schools' schedule, and hiring a police officer to direct traffic at the entrance. About 1 mile (1.6 km) to the east lies Scotts Corners, NY 17K's intersection with NY 208. Just past the intersection, the headquarters of Walden Federal bank sit atop a hill on the north side of the road. Shortly afterward, Berea Elementary School adds its traffic to the nearby intersection.

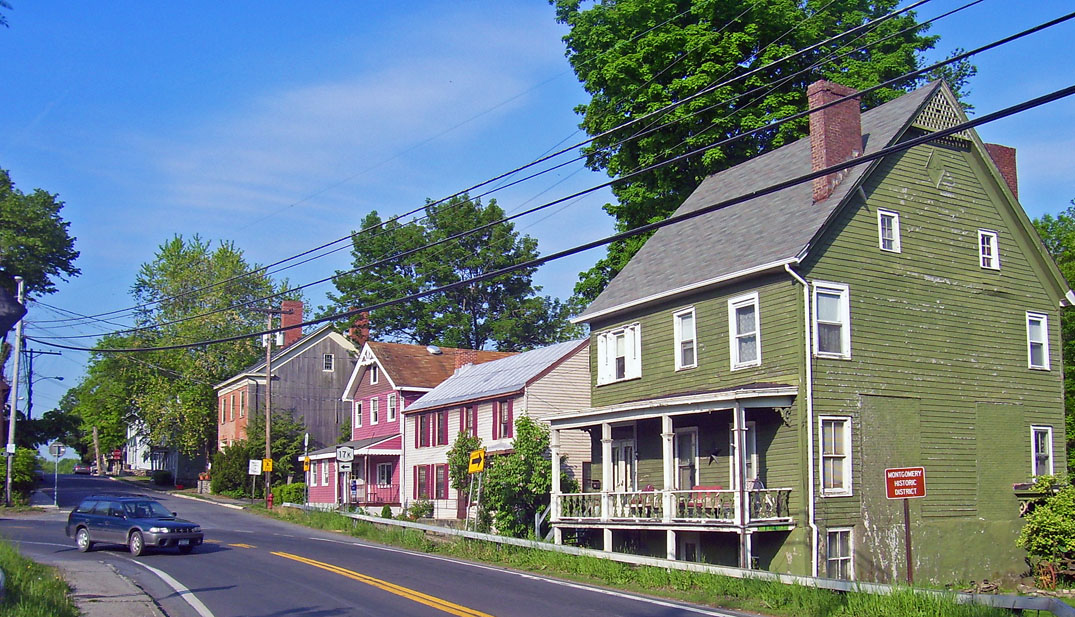
Homes dating from the early 19th century in the Bridge Street Historic District at the western entrance to the village of Montgomery.

Past the elementary school, NY 17K runs parallel to the nearby I-84 but remains undeveloped, with the odd house, store or side street breaking the woods. Much of the land here is owned by the county as part of its Farmers' Museum, which surrounds the Nathaniel Hill Brick House, an early settler's home still occupied by his descendants. The next signalized intersection, Coldenham Road, provides a direct route to Walden for traffic coming from the east. NY 17K continues on toward its next light, situated at the junction with NY 747, a north–south route connecting NY 17K to I-84 and Stewart International Airport.

=== Newburgh area ===
NY 747 largely follows the original routing of Drury Lane, which carried CR 54 between NY 17K and NY 207. While most of the county road was upgraded on the spot, the part of NY 747 closest to NY 17K was built on a new alignment to the west to avoid possible damage to the Catskill Aqueduct, which crosses NY 17K here. This created a four-way intersection with Stone Castle Road, which was itself slightly relocated to the west as part of the plan to protect the adjacent Colden Mansion Ruins. Not far to the east of this junction is the lone piece of Drury Lane not included in the new route, which now ends in a cul-de-sac but still carries the CR 54 designation south of NY 17K.

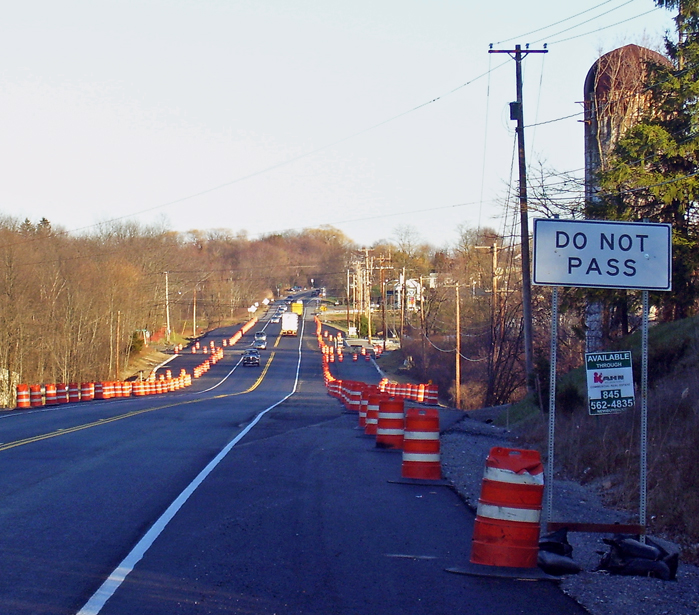
Widening of NY 17K at Drury Lane in December 2006

After Drury Lane, NY 17K passes the last building of the Valley Central School District, East Coldenham Elementary School. In November 1989, nine students died here when a wall collapsed during a freak tornado. Development along the highway begins to increase at this point as NY 17K directly intersects I-84 and runs along the northern boundary of Stewart Airport. The Newburgh Auto Auction's vast parking lots are visible to the north while commercial hangars and the local Air National Guard base can be seen to the south. The base's entrance road, secured with a series of concrete barriers since the September 11, 2001 attacks, marks the end of the airport property.

The route continues on, passing north of the Orange County Choppers's headquarters just before it crosses over the New York State Thruway (I-87). East of the Thruway, NY 17K widens to four lanes with a middle turn lane and becomes heavily developed as it reaches the busy intersection with the Newburgh area's main commercial strip, NY 300. Actual access to the Thruway is no longer possible from NY 17K; instead, motorists must proceed north on NY 300 for approximately 0.5 miles (0.8 km), at which point access to both I-87 and I-84 is provided. A short distance past the intersection with NY 300 is the former entrance ramp to the Thruway, which was utilized from 1955 until late 2009. Originally, the state planned to eradicate this entrance/exit ramp altogether, but changed their minds at the last minute when it was determined the overpass over Route 300 was in exceptionally good condition. Now, the ramp is open only to E-ZPass holders exiting the Thruway.

The four-lane section continues through the town of Newburgh to the Newburgh city limit, where it narrows to two lanes and maintenance of the route switches from the New York State Department of Transportation (NYSDOT) to the city of Newburgh. The route follows Broadway past several primarily residential blocks before meeting the eastern terminus of NY 207 at Wisner Avenue. Further on, NY 32 comes in from the south as Lake Street. The two form the only concurrency along NY 17K as they overlap for several more blocks to the US 9W junction at Robinson Avenue in a commercial section of Newburgh. Here, NY 17K ends while NY 32 turns north to join US 9W.

== History ==
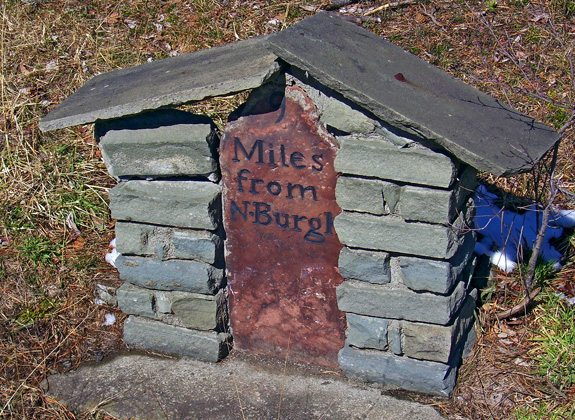
An original stone marker from the Newburgh and Cochecton Turnpike along NY 17K near the Nathaniel Hill Brick House in Montgomery.

Modern NY 17K follows the easternmost part of the Newburgh and Cochecton Turnpike, a 19th-century toll road that extended from the Delaware River at Cochecton to the Hudson River at Newburgh. The turnpike was opened in 1810 and dissolved in 1872 following the establishment of the nearby Middletown and Crawford Railroad one year earlier. Stone markers indicating the distance from Newburgh can still be seen by the roadside at several locations. In the early 20th century, the state of New York took over the turnpike's former routing from Fosterdale east to Newburgh to rebuild the highway as a toll-free state road. The segment from Bloomingburg to Newburgh was added to the state highway system in stages, beginning on September 9, 1902, with the section between Montgomery and what is now the New York State Thruway overpass near Newburgh. The Bloomingburg–Newburgh state highway was entirely state-maintained by 1926.

When the first set of posted routes in New York were assigned in 1924, the portion of the highway between Montgomery and Newburgh became part of NY 8, a route that went from the New Jersey state line at Unionville to Newburgh via Middletown. The designation proved to be short-lived, however, as it was eliminated as part of the 1930 renumbering of state highways in New York. From the New Jersey line to Montgomery, NY 8 became NY 84. The remainder of old NY 8 became part of NY 215, a new route that continued west to Bloomingburg over the previously unnumbered state highway linking the two locations. Like the first NY 8, NY 215 was short-lived as it was redesignated as NY 17K in March 1939. At one time, NY 17K extended eastward into downtown Newburgh to serve the now-defunct ferry linking Newburgh to Beacon. The change from NY 215 to NY 17K was done because of pressure from the Newburgh Chamber of Commerce and the Liberty Highway–Route 17 Association to take traffic off NY 17 during the 1939 World's Fair.

NY 17K's western terminus was truncated to end at NY 17 by 2017.

== Major intersections ==
The entire route is in Orange County.

Location	mi	km	Destinations	Notes
Wallkill	0.00	0.00	Future I-86 / NY 17 – New York City, Monticello	Western terminus; exit 116 on NY 17
Crawford	3.36	5.41	NY 302 – Pine Bush, Circleville	Hamlet of Bullville
Village of Montgomery	10.30	16.58	NY 211 west – Middletown	Eastern terminus of NY 211
Town of Montgomery	12.23	19.68	NY 208 – Walden, Maybrook	Hamlet of Scotts Corner
Town of Montgomery			NY 747 south to I-84 – Stewart Airport	Northern terminus of NY 747
Town of Newburgh	17.03	27.41	I-84 – Port Jervis, Danbury, CT	Exit 34 on I-84; hamlet of East Coldenham
Town of Newburgh	19.55	31.46	NY 300 to I-87 Toll / New York Thruway / I-84 – Stewart Airport	
City of Newburgh	21.03	33.84	NY 207 west (Little Britain Road)	Eastern terminus of NY 207
City of Newburgh	21.78	35.05	NY 32 south (Lake Street)	Western end of NY 32 concurrency
City of Newburgh	22.01	35.42	US 9W / NY 32 north (Robinson Avenue)	Eastern terminus; eastern end of NY 32 concurrency
1.000 mi = 1.609 km; 1.000 km = 0.621 mi: Concurrency terminus; Incomplete access
