= New York State Route 208 =

Highway in southern New York state, U.S.

New York State Route 208
- Map of the Hudson Valley with NY 208 highlighted in red

Route information
- Maintained by NYSDOT
- Length: 34.81 mi (56.02 km)
- Existed: 1930–present

Major junctions
- South end: NY 17M in Monroe village
- Future I-86 / US 6 / NY 17 in Monroe town; I-84 in Montgomery; US 44 / NY 55 in Gardiner
- North end: NY 32 / NY 299 in New Paltz

Location
- Country: United States
- State: New York
- Counties: Orange, Ulster

Highway system
- New York Highways; Interstate; US; State; Reference; Parkways
← NY 207	→ US 209

New York State Route 208 (NY 208) is a state highway located in southern New York in the United States. The southern terminus is at an intersection with NY 17M in the Orange County village of Monroe. Its northern terminus is located at an intersection with NY 32 and NY 299 in the Ulster County village of New Paltz.

NY 208 is a two-lane road for its entire length. While connecting two bustling villages and passing through three others, it is primarily a country road and offers a variety of scenery and points of interest, from fields and meadows to a riverside stretch and orchards devoted to apples. The northern third, between Wallkill and New Paltz, boasts a near-continuous view of the Shawangunk Ridge.

== Route description ==
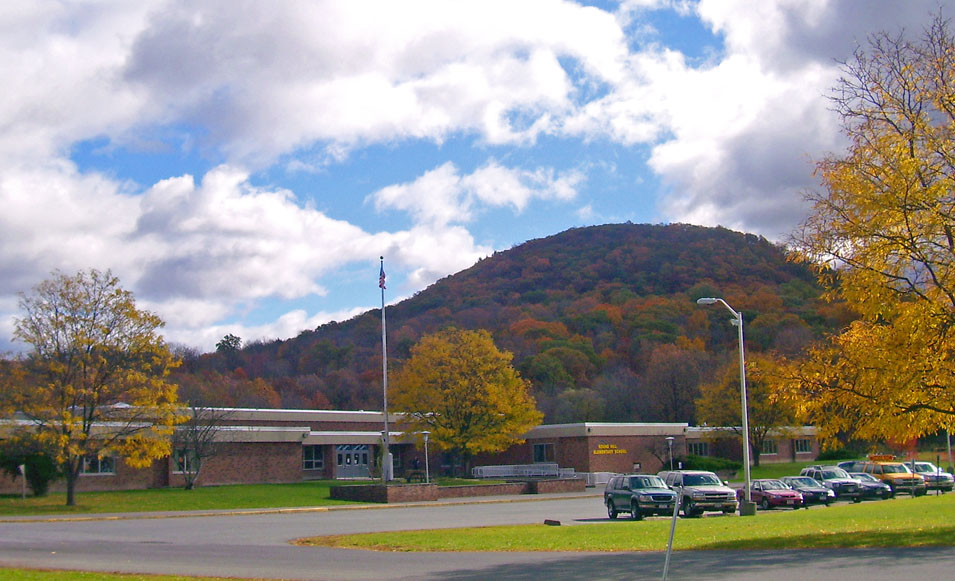
Round Hill Elementary School

=== Orange County ===
From its southern terminus at a busy traffic light in Monroe, NY 208 quickly crosses US 6/NY 17 and then stays in the shade of the southwestern corner of Schunemunk Mountain as it heads north to Washingtonville, remaining relatively straight through mostly wooded, undeveloped country with some views of the mountain. Round Hill Elementary School heralds the approach of the village. Shortly after entering Washingtonville, it intersects with NY 94.

NY 208 crosses the village line rather quickly, going through some sharp curves as it enters more open farmland. Here, the highway also deviates from its northward course, heading much more westward as it picks up the headwaters of Moodna Creek and passes its source, the confluence of Otter Kill and Cromline Creek. Shortly afterwards, it again turns northward at the Sarah Wells Trail junction. Eventually the land surrounding the highway once again becomes more wooded and it goes through a short tunnel under the railroad tracks shared by Norfolk Southern and Metro-North.

About a mile past the tunnel, NY 208 abruptly reaches NY 207 outside the hamlet of Rock Tavern. The two routes overlap for a hundred yards as they pass small Brown's Pond and a weir, then NY 208 once again turns left to go north alongside the pond, into some more open countryside. It passes the west boundary of Stewart State Forest, goes over a little-used rail spur, once part of the Wallkill Valley Railroad (WVRR) and then enters Maybrook, which it serves as the main street. A feature of this town is the large Yellow Freight terminal in its north end, continuing a tradition of importance in transportation that began with the village's origins as a major regional rail hub.

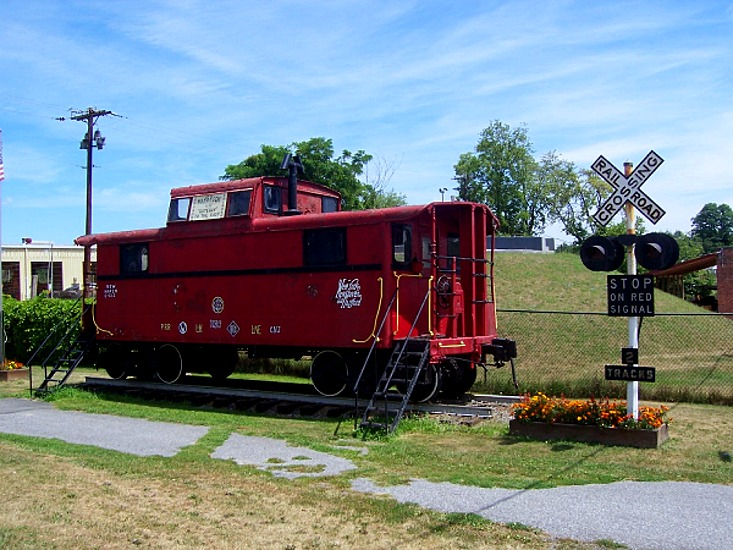
Caboose along NY 208 at Maybrook, celebrating the village's past importance as a rail hub

Shortly after leaving Maybrook, NY 208 reaches Interstate 84 (I-84). This exit, the only one for several miles in either direction on the Interstate Highway, contains several businesses. Here, for the only point on its entire length, NY 208 swells beyond two lanes with the addition of turn lanes for the interstate's onramps. There is a heavy truck presence at the NY 208/I-84/CR 99 (Neelytown Road) interchange. Several companies have built warehouse facilities on CR 99, including Home Depot, Cardinal Health and Do It Best Corporation. Also found in this area is Federal Express Freight, Yellow Freight and several other national trucking firms.

North of I-84, the road remains a two-lane until it intersects with NY 17K at Scotts Corners. This intersection was redesigned and upgraded in 2008 to accommodate left and right turn lanes.

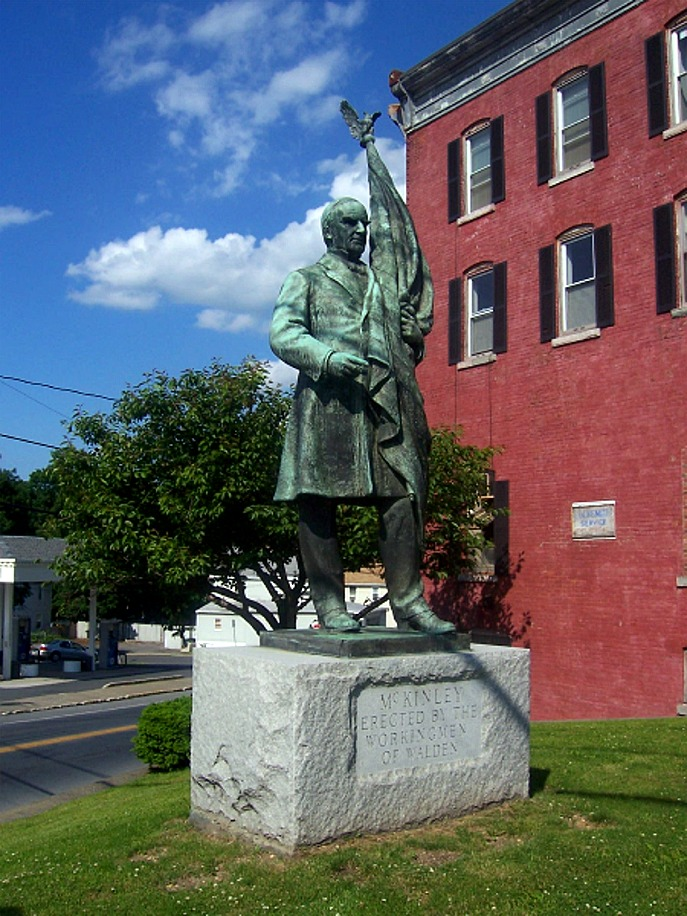
Statue of President William McKinley at junction of NY 52 and NY 208 in Walden

Continuing north, NY 208 goes around some mild bends past woods and fields. Here the highway offers its first view to the Shawangunks. In 2 miles (3.2 km) it reaches Walden, the largest community on NY 208 after Monroe. After crossing the old WVRR main line, now the north end of a lightly used freight spur, it becomes Orange Avenue with a mix of residential and commercial properties. In the center of town NY 52 comes in from the east at an oblique angle more like a merger than a junction; traffic at rush hour there is made more difficult by vehicles attempting to cross 52 and enter the adjacent Hess station as well as a local one-way side street. Since NY 52 comes in at a slightly lower elevation, it has the right of way, guaranteed by the stop sign greeting drivers on NY 208.

The two roads make an unsigned concurrency for about two blocks of East Main Street before a traffic light separates them; traffic on NY 208 turns right, on Ulster Avenue, to continue north. This takes the traveler past some of Walden's older homes and Most Precious Blood Catholic school before finally leaving the village at the Tin Brook bridge, whereupon it almost immediately bends westward at the Lake Osiris Road junction for a short distance, curving north again when it reaches the Wallkill River.

=== Ulster County ===
The mile of highway along the Wallkill is at first wooded and curvy but then offers many pleasant riverside scenes. A burned-out former Borden Cheese factory is the last highlight before crossing the county line. This section of the river is popular with local fishermen and there are many informal parking spots available (In winters when it is cold enough for the river to freeze over, snowmobile trails can be seen on the ice). An Ulster County sheriff's substation is the first in a string of buildings that indicate the road has reached the hamlet of Wallkill.

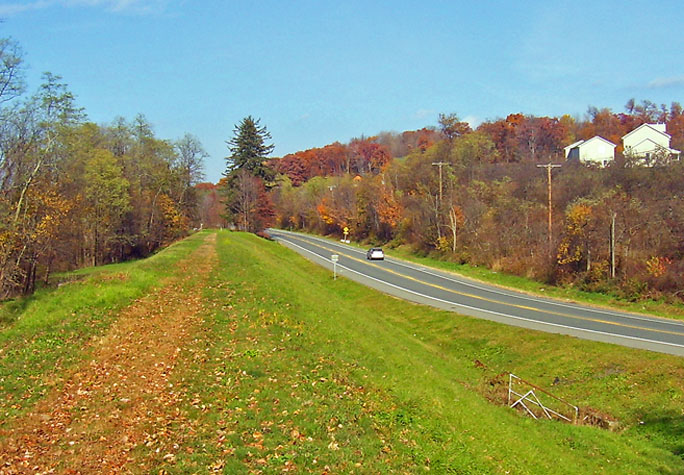
The Catskill Aqueduct and NY 208 between Wallkill and Gardiner

Immediately east of the hamlet's business district, at Wallkill Library it turns right onto Main Street and takes a more easterly course out of town, past some rolling fields and John G. Borden Middle School. At the only traffic light here, the northern terminus of NY 300, it regains its northward orientation, which it will keep for its final 11 miles (17.6 km) to New Paltz.

While remaining two-lane, the roadway itself is a little wider here, encouraging drivers to accelerate as the woodlots surrounding them give way to the cornfields of Wallkill and Shawangunk state prisons and the panoramic view of the Shawangunk Ridge across the river valley that continues most of the way to New Paltz (Sometimes the summit of Slide Mountain, the Catskill Mountains' highest peak, is visible over the ridge).

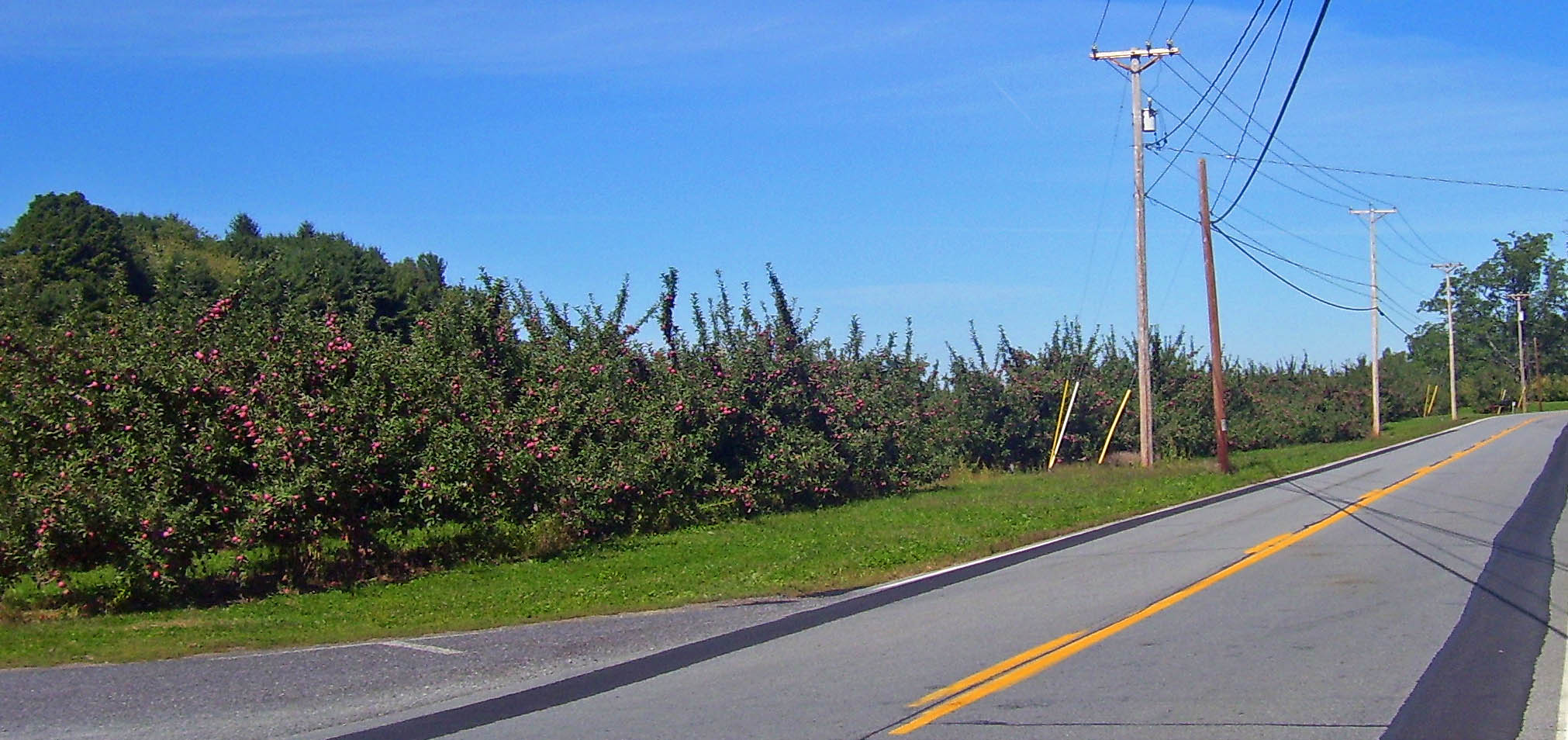
NY 208 in apple country

As the drive continues, the Catskill Aqueduct crosses and recrosses the road several times and orchards become the primary agricultural use of the adjoining land. This is one of the state's prime apple-growing regions, and several local apple farmers sell fresh-pressed cider at their stands along the road in the fall.

The only traffic light along this stretch is at Ireland Corners, the slightly developed intersection with US 44/NY 55 just east of Gardiner. It marks the midway point between Wallkill and New Paltz.

North of here, even better views of the Shawangunks open up with the observation tower at Mohonk Mountain House becoming prominent to the west. The Devil's Path in the Greene County Catskills appears to the north on clear enough days. Some vineyards join the orchards along the road, reflecting a developing local wine industry. The campus of SUNY New Paltz starts to form a distinct skyline to the north, and to the east the ridgeline of Illinois Mountain complements the Shawangunks.

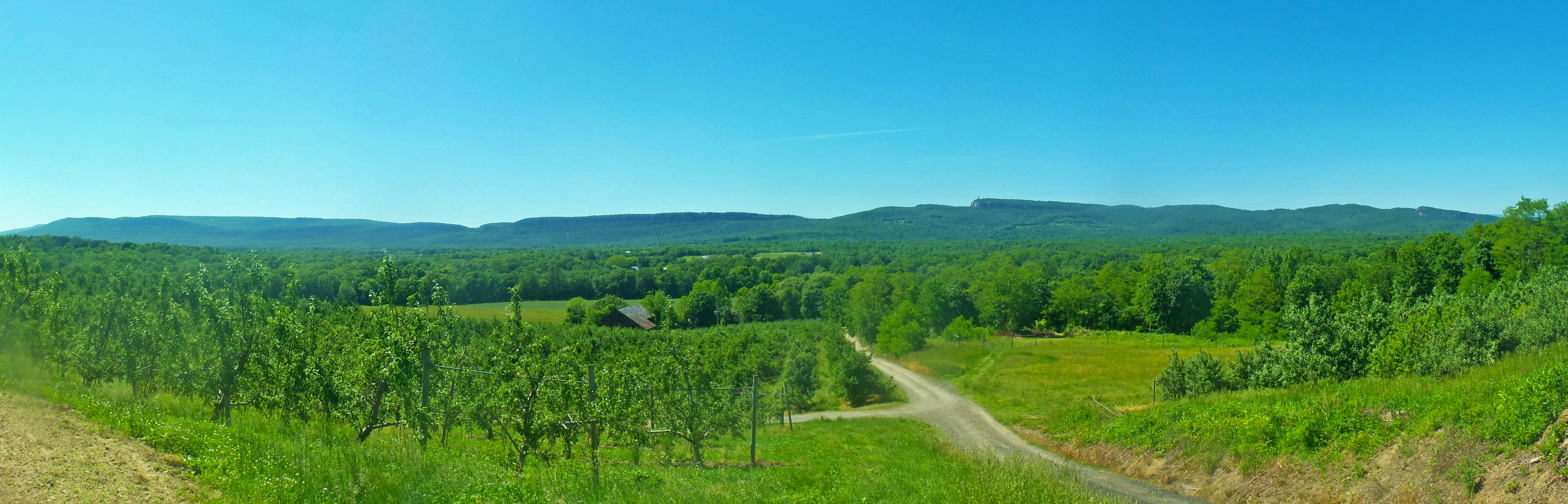
The Shawangunk Ridge as seen from NY 208 south of New Paltz

The views reach their peak at the New Paltz town line, then NY 208 descends from the rise it has reached. After some tight curves and bends, SUNY's athletic fields to the east herald entry into the village of New Paltz, where NY 208 becomes South Chestnut Street. A mile into the village, it reaches its northern terminus at a busy intersection at the edge of downtown with NY 299 and NY 32. Continuing north from here puts a driver on the latter.

== History ==
The earliest of the road segments that make up NY 208 dates to 1735, when a "Highway Deed" was drawn up for a segment in the Town of Montgomery, then in Ulster County, from the Shawangunk town line to what was then the Goshen town line (today Hamptonburgh). When it came to acquire a name, it was first Walden Road. In 1950, Maybrook renamed its portion Homestead Avenue in honor of early settlers whose houses stood or had stood along the road.

=== Designation ===
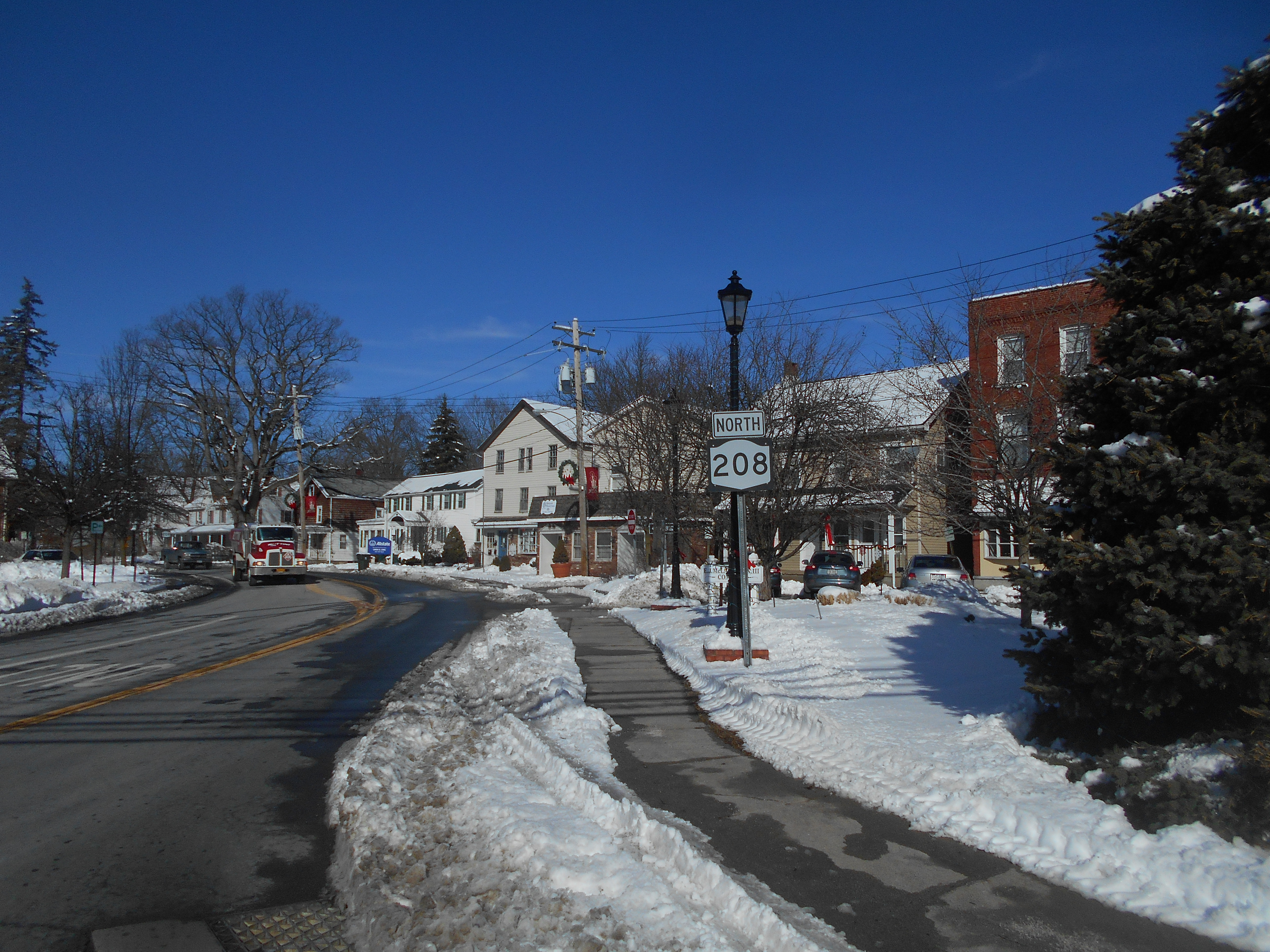
NY 208 in Washingtonville

NY 208 was assigned to its current routing between Monroe and Gardiner in the 1930 renumbering of state highways in New York. The route was extended north to its current terminus in New Paltz c. 1934. Prior to 1930, the entirety of NY 208 was unnumbered. When US 6 was rerouted to follow the new Quickway and NY 32 between Monroe and Central Valley in the mid-1950s, NY 208 was extended northeast from Monroe along the former routing of US 6 to Highland Mills, where it terminated at NY 32. This extension of NY 208 remained in place until April 1, 1980, when ownership and maintenance of NY 208 from Schunnemunk Street in Monroe to Highland Mills was transferred to Orange County as part of a large highway maintenance swap between the county and the state of New York. Following the swap, NY 208 was rerouted within Monroe to follow its current alignment between NY 17M and Schunnemunk Street while the former routing of NY 208 between Monroe and Highland Mills was redesignated as County Route 105.

In 2006, the portion of the route between Washingtonville and New Paltz was also designated as State Bicycle Route 208.

=== New Jersey connection ===
In the 1940s, the New Jersey Department of Transportation planned to link a spur route then called Route S4B from Paramus up though Bergen County to connect with NY 208 at Monroe. The road never got any further than Oakland, but it was renumbered to Route 208 in 1953.

=== Traffic congestion ===
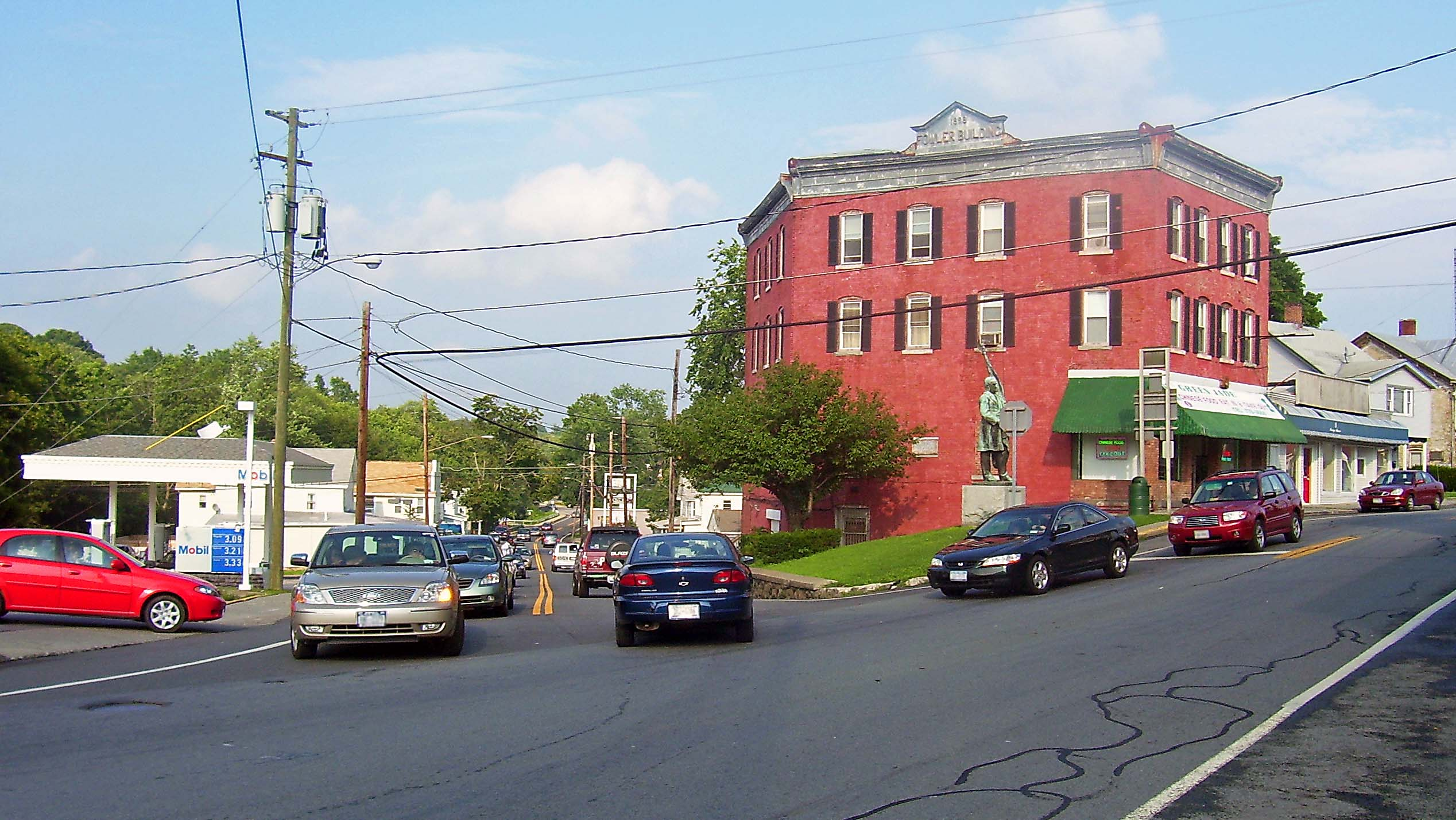
The congested southern end of the NY 52 / NY 208 overlap in Walden.

The village of Walden noted in its 2005 Comprehensive Plan the difficulties created by the oblique intersection at the southern end of the NY 52 concurrency. Traffic on northbound NY 208 comes to a stop sign at the intersection, where NY 52 comes in from the right at a slightly lower grade and a sharp angle, with the view mostly blocked by a building. The layout of the intersection is very poor for trucks making this turn, and the congestion all these factors create has been forcing more drivers to resort to side streets, the village believed, since traffic counts have been going up on NY 52 and NY 208 but down on the concurrency. The village hoped to work with the state DOT on marking an alternate route for trucks, but as of now, no official solution has been reached.

== Major intersections ==
County	Location	mi	km	Destinations	Notes
Orange	Village of Monroe	0.00	0.00	NY 17M – Harriman, Chester	Southern terminus
Orange	Town of Monroe	0.88	1.42	Future I-86 / US 6 / NY 17 – Suffern, Chester	Exit 130 on NY 17
Orange	Washingtonville	7.42	11.94	NY 94 – Chester, Vails Gate	
Orange	Hamptonburgh	11.10	17.86	NY 207 west – Goshen	Southern end of NY 207 concurrency; hamlet of Burnside
Orange	Hamptonburgh	11.23	18.07	NY 207 east – Newburgh	Northern end of NY 207 concurrency; hamlet of Burnside
Orange	Town of Montgomery	15.72	25.30	I-84 – Newburgh, Middletown, Stewart International Airport	Exit 28 on I-84; hamlet of Morrison Heights
Orange	Town of Montgomery	16.82	27.07	NY 17K – Montgomery, Newburgh	Hamlet of Scotts Corner
Orange	Walden	19.43	31.27	NY 52 east – Newburgh	Southern end of NY 52 concurrency
Orange	Walden	19.49	31.37	NY 52 west – Pine Bush	Northern end of NY 52 concurrency
Ulster	Shawangunk	23.75	38.22	NY 300 south – Newburgh	Northern terminus of NY 300; hamlet of Wallkill
Ulster	Gardiner	29.08	46.80	US 44 / NY 55 – Kerhonkson, Poughkeepsie	Hamlet of Ireland Corners
Ulster	Village of New Paltz	34.13	54.93	Hawk Drive – State University of New York at New Paltz	
Ulster	Village of New Paltz	34.81	56.02	NY 32 / NY 299 to New York Thruway (I-87) – Kerhonkson, Rosendale, Highland	Northern terminus
1.000 mi = 1.609 km; 1.000 km = 0.621 mi: Concurrency terminus
