= Silver Lake, Orange County, New York =

Lake in Wallkill, New York, United States

Coordinates: 41°27′36″N 74°23′15″W

Silver Lake is a small lake in Orange County, New York, located adjacent to New York State Route 17 exit 120 northeast of Middletown in Wallkill.
