= Crawford, New York =

- Town
- Town of Crawford
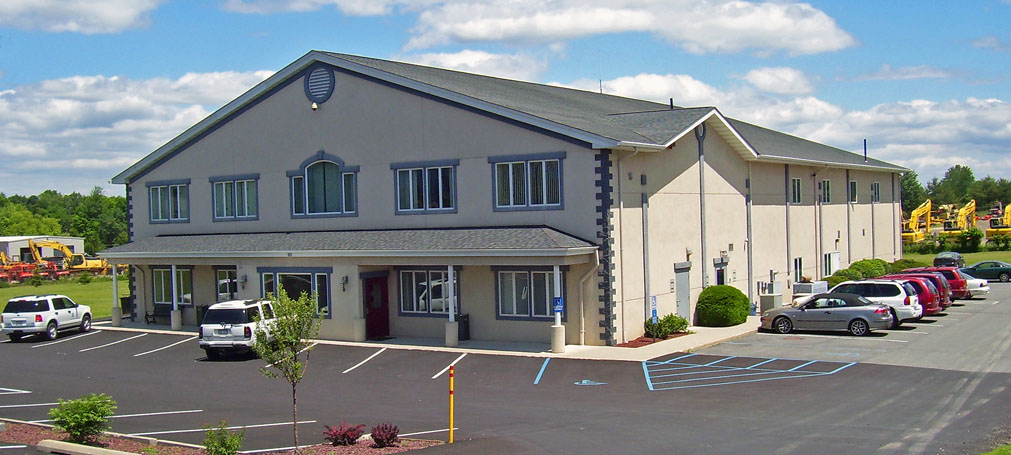
- Crawford Town Hall, on NY 302 in Pine Bush

- Location in Orange County and the state of New York.

- Location within the state of New York
- Coordinates: 41°36′N 74°18′W
- Country: United States
- State: New York
- County: Orange
- Settled: 1740
- Established: 1823

Government
  - Type: Town Council
  - Town Supervisor: Charles E. Carnes (REP)
  - Town Council: Members' List: • Angelina Jadrossich (REP); • Michael Menendez (REP); • John Barth (REP); • Jason Muehr (REP)

Area
  - Total: 40.12 sq mi (103.90 km^{2})
  - Land: 40.03 sq mi (103.68 km^{2})
  - Water: 0.085 sq mi (0.22 km^{2})
- Elevation: 486 ft (148 m)

Population (2020)
  - Total: 9,130
  - Density: 228/sq mi (88.1/km^{2})
- Time zone: UTC-5 (EST)
  - Summer (DST): UTC-4 (EDT)
- FIPS code: 36-18916
- GNIS feature ID: 0978877
- Website: Town website

Crawford is a town in the north of Orange County, New York, United States. The population was 9,130 at the 2020 census. The name comes from a settler who gave his name to a community in the hamlet now called Pine Bush.

== History ==
Crawford was originally settled c. 1740. Crawford was originally part of the town of Montgomery. Crawford was established as a town in 1823. Ten years earlier, in 1813, it had been branded as the butter capital of the world. Searsville, once an economic center and location of the town government, lost its status when the railroad came to the town through another area.

== Geography ==
According to the United States Census Bureau, the town has a total area of 40.2 square miles (104 km^{2}), of which 40.1 square miles (104 km^{2}) is land and 0.04 square miles (0.10 km^{2}) (0.10%) is water.

The northern town line is the border of Ulster County, partly marked by the Shawangunk Kill, a small river.

NYS Route 52 and NYS Route 302 intersect in Pine Bush. NYS Route 17K crosses the southern part of the town.

== Demographics ==
Historical population
Census	Pop.	Note	%±
1830	2,019		—
1840	2,075		2.8%
1850	1,912		−7.9%
1860	2,003		4.8%
1870	2,024		1.0%
1880	1,951		−3.6%
1890	1,876		−3.8%
1900	1,778		−5.2%
1910	1,659		−6.7%
1920	1,507		−9.2%
1930	1,800		19.4%
1940	1,786		−0.8%
1950	2,410		34.9%
1960	2,574		6.8%
1970	3,896		51.4%
1980	4,910		26.0%
1990	6,394		30.2%
2000	7,875		23.2%
2010	9,316		18.3%
2020	9,130		−2.0%
U.S. Decennial Census

As of the census of 2000, there were 7,875 people, 2,707 households, and 2,133 families residing in the town. The population density was 196.3 inhabitants per square mile (75.8/km^{2}). There were 2,851 housing units at an average density of 71.1 per square mile (27.5/km^{2}). The racial makeup of the town was 95.59% white, 1.19% African American, 0.08% Native American, 0.76% Asian, 0.01% Pacific Islander, 1.16% from other races, and 1.21% from two or more races. Hispanic or Latino of any race were 5.13% of the population.

There were 2,707 households, out of which 42.3% had children under the age of 18 living with them, 65.8% were married couples living together, 8.2% had a female householder with no husband present, and 21.2% were non-families. 17.4% of all households were made up of individuals, and 7.2% had someone living alone who was 65 years of age or older. The average household size was 2.90 and the average family size was 3.29.

In the town, the population was spread out, with 30.3% under the age of 18, 6.1% from 18 to 24, 30.2% from 25 to 44, 24.1% from 45 to 64, and 9.2% who were 65 years of age or older. The median age was 36 years. For every 100 females, there were 98.3 males. For every 100 females age 18 and over, there were 94.2 males.

The median income for a household in the town was $57,063, and the median income for a family was $63,722. Males had a median income of $42,200 versus $30,763 for females. The per capita income for the town was $21,614. About 2.7% of families and 4.0% of the population were below the poverty line, including 3.5% of those under age 18 and 7.0% of those age 65 or over.

== Communities and locations in Crawford ==
- Bullville – A hamlet in the southern part of Crawford on NY 17K at the intersection of NY 302.
- Collabar – a hamlet in the southern part of Crawford on NY 17K.
- Hopewell – a former community in the town.
- Pine Bush (formerly called "Crawford') – hamlet in the town's northwestern corner at the junction of NY 52 and NY 302.
- Searsville (formerly "Searsburg") – a hamlet on County Route 17, east of Thompson Ridge.
- Thompson Ridge – a hamlet on NY 302, south of Pine Bush. The John I. Crawford Farm was listed on the National Register of Historic Places in 1998.
- Van Keuren – a hamlet on NY 302 between Pine Bush and Thompson Ridge.
