= Circleville, New York =

Circleville
- Hamlet
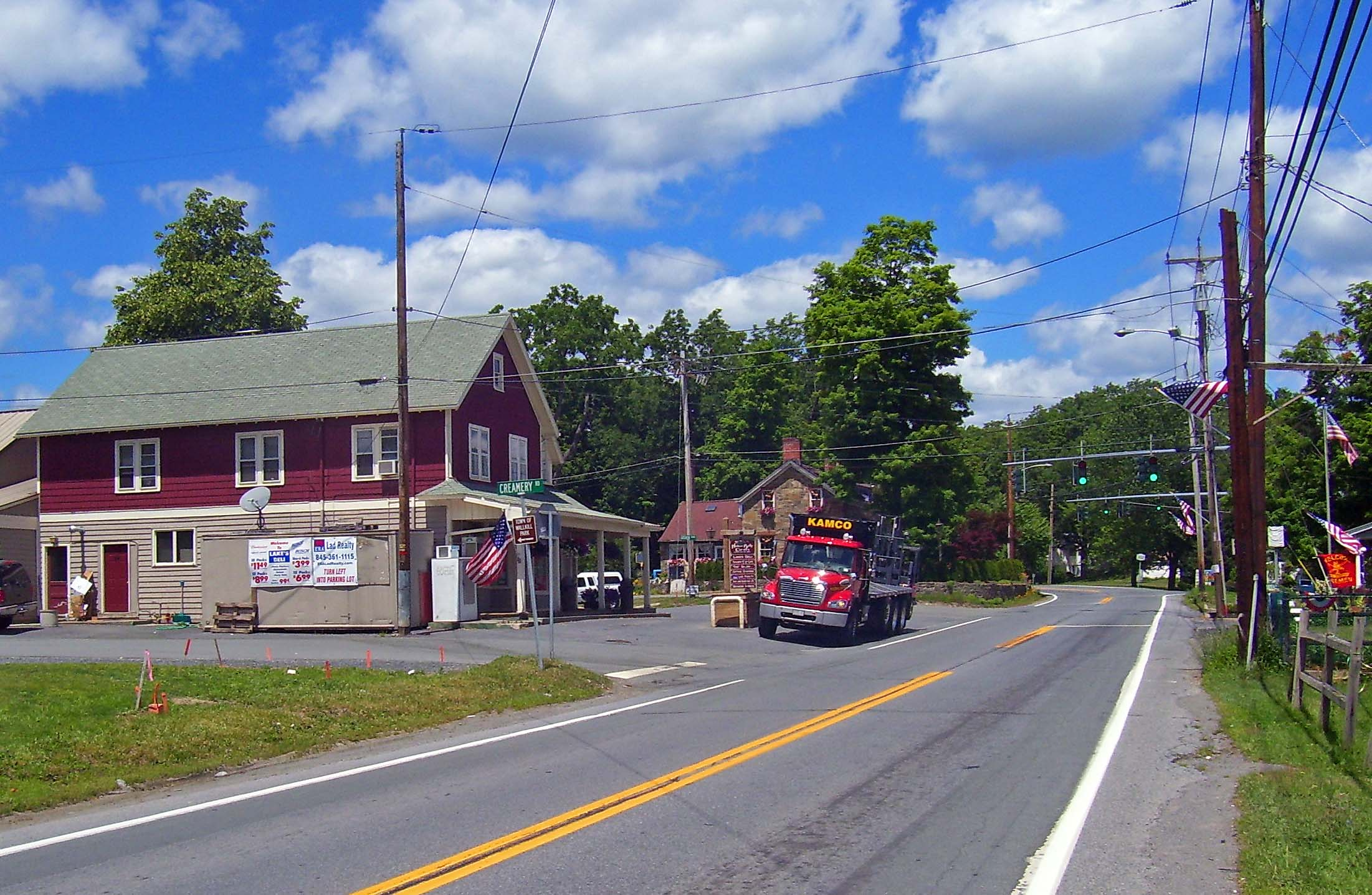
- The intersection of NY 302 and Goshen Turnpike at the center of Circleville.

- Location within New York
- Coordinates: 41°30′51″N 74°23′01″W
- Country: United States
- State: New York
- County: Orange
- Time zone: UTC-5 (Eastern (EST))
  - Summer (DST): UTC-4 (EDT)
- ZIP Code: 10919

Circleville is a hamlet in the Town of Wallkill, part of Orange County, New York, United States. It is located on NY 302, around the junction with the old Goshen Turnpike (Orange County 101), a short distance north of NY 17 and two miles (3 km) south of Bullville. It is three miles (4.8 km) northeast of Middletown.

It has its own post office, with the ZIP Code 10919, and lends its name to a nearby middle and elementary school of the Pine Bush Central School District, as well as the local fire district. It also has a parked namely Circleville Park.
