= Wallkill, Orange County, New York =

Wallkill, New York
- Town
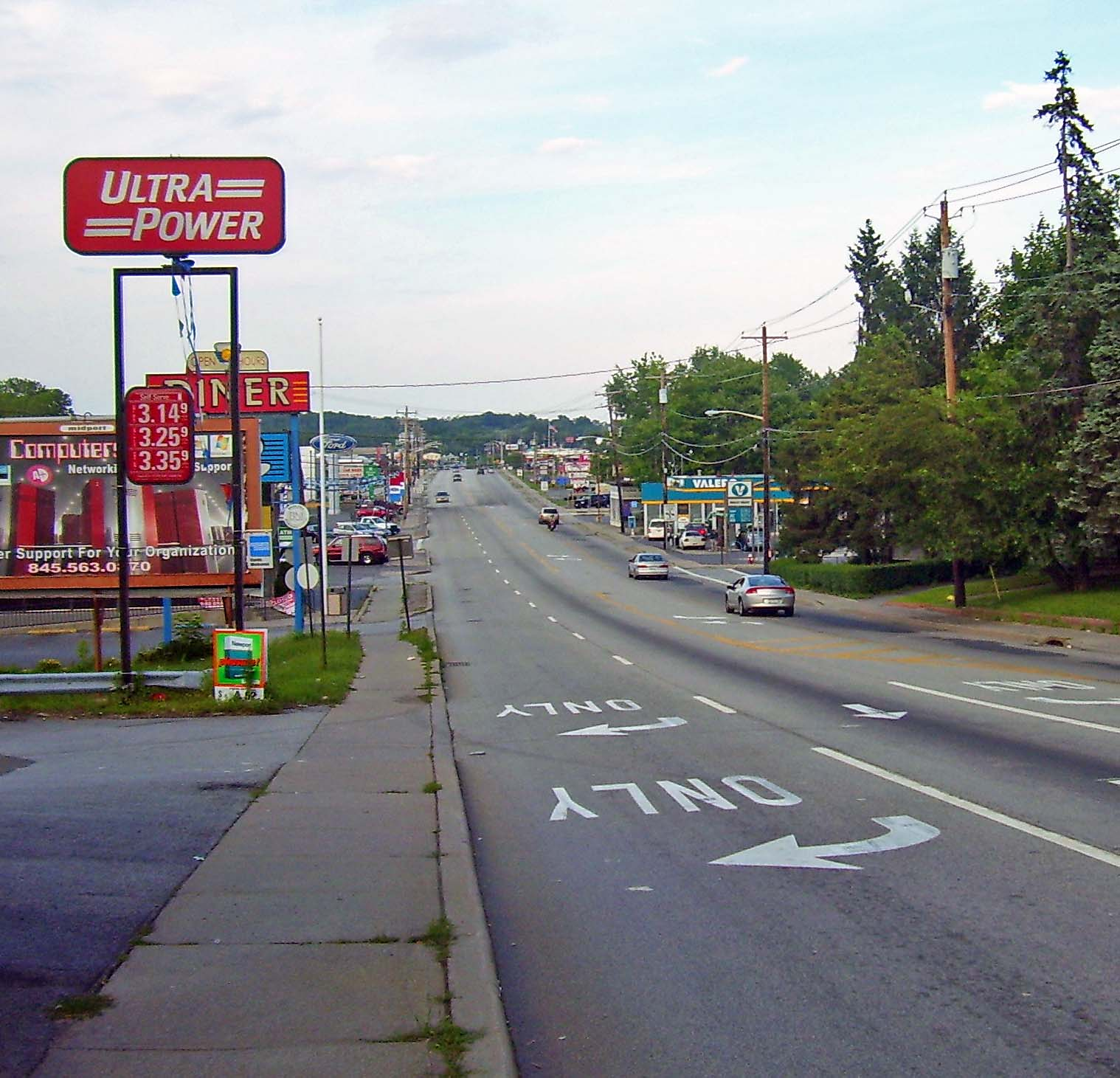
- Route 211 looking towards Wallkill from Middletown

- Location in Orange County and the state of New York

- Location within New York
- Coordinates: 41°28′N 74°22′W
- Country: United States
- State: New York
- County: Orange
- Established: 1772

Area
  - Total: 62.8 sq mi (163 km^{2})
  - Land: 62.2 sq mi (161 km^{2})
  - Water: 0.6 sq mi (1.6 km^{2}) 0.92%

Population (2020)
  - Total: 30,486
  - Density: 490/sq mi (189/km^{2})
- Website: www.townofwallkill.gov

Wallkill is a town in Orange County, New York, United States. The population was 30,486 at the 2020 census. It is centrally located in the county. Interstate 84 crosses New York State Route 17 in the southern part of the town. U.S. Route 6 and New York State routes 17K, 211 and 302 also cross portions of the town.

== History ==
The original land patent for the town was dated 1724, but little was done for decades to develop and settle the region. The town was established in 1772, but part of the town was lost upon the formation of Ulster County. Wallkill's claim to fame during the American Revolution was the production of gunpowder in factories in Phillipsburgh and Craigville for American troops by Henry Wisner and his son-in-law Moses Phillips.

== Geography ==
According to the United States Census Bureau, the town has a total area of 62.8 square miles (163 km^{2}) of which 62.2 square miles (161 km^{2}) is land and 0.6 square miles (1.6 km^{2}) (0.92%) is water.

Wallkill is bordered by the towns of Hamptonburgh and Montgomery on the east, Crawford on the north, Mamakating and Mount Hope on the west, and Wawayanda and Goshen on the south. The town almost completely surrounds the city of Middletown.

=== Communities and locations in Wallkill ===
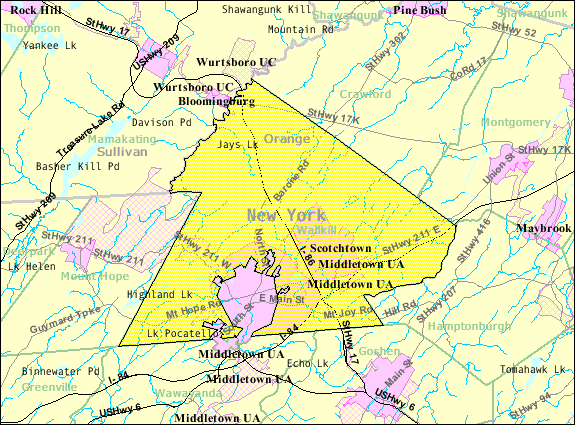
U.S. Census Map

- Baileyville – a hamlet near Howells, located on NY-211 near the western town line
- Crystal Run – a hamlet south of Michigan Corners, near Interstate 84 at County Road 83
- Circleville – a hamlet in the northern part of town on NY-302
- East Middletown – a village in the southeastern part of town
- Fair Oaks – a hamlet in the northern part of town on NY-17
- Highland Lake – a small lake near the western town line
- Highland Lakes State Park – an undeveloped state park in the northern part of the town
- Howells – a hamlet in the northwestern part of town, north of Baileyville
- Maple Glen – a hamlet near the western town line
- Mechanicstown – a hamlet and census-designated place in the southeastern part of town
- Michigan Corners – a hamlet near Scotchtown in the eastern part of town on NY-211
- Middletown, a city almost entirely surrounded by the town of Wallkill
- Milburn – a hamlet by Highland Lakes State Park
- Phillipsburg – a hamlet in the southeastern part of the town, on the Wallkill River and NY-17
- Pilgrim Corners – a hamlet bordering the western side of Middletown on NY-211
- Rockville – a hamlet in the northern part of town
- Scotchtown – a hamlet and census-designated place in the eastern part of town on Route 101
- Silver Lake – a small lake east of Middletown
- Stony Ford – a location near the eastern town line at the Wallkill River on County Road 53
- Van Burenville – a hamlet in the northwestern part of town near Mount Hope
- Washington Heights – a hamlet and census-designated place in the northwestern part of town

== Demographics ==
Historical population
Census	Pop.	Note	%±
1790	2,571		—
1820	4,887		—
1830	4,056		−17.0%
1840	4,268		5.2%
1850	4,942		15.8%
1860	6,603		33.6%
1870	9,477		43.5%
1880	11,486		21.2%
1890	2,755		−76.0%
1900	2,725		−1.1%
1910	2,578		−5.4%
1920	2,598		0.8%
1930	3,835		47.6%
1940	4,753		23.9%
1950	5,947		25.1%
1960	8,176		37.5%
1970	11,518		40.9%
1980	20,481		77.8%
1990	23,016		12.4%
2000	24,659		7.1%
2010	27,426		11.2%
2020	30,486		11.2%
U.S. Decennial Census

As of the 2010 census, the population of the town was 27,426. The ethnic makeup of the population was 57.8% white (non-Hispanic), 22.5% Hispanic, 16.0% African-American, 3.2% Asian, and 0.5% Native American.

As of the census of 2000, there were 24,659 people, 8,866 households, and 6,330 families residing in the town. The population density was 396.6 inhabitants per square mile (153.1/km^{2}). There were 9,283 housing units at an average density of 149.3 per square mile (57.6/km^{2}). The racial makeup of the town was 80.70% white, 9.34% African American, 0.30% Native American, 2.39% Asian, 0.05% Pacific Islander, 4.31% from other races, and 2.90% from two or more races. Hispanic or Latino of any race were 13.40% of the population.

36.5% of the households had children under the age of 18 living with them; 54.6% were married couples living together, 12.4% had a female householder with no husband present, and 28.6% were non-families. 22.6% of all households were made up of individuals, and 7.9% had someone living alone who was 65 years of age or older. The average household size was 2.72 and the average family size was 3.22.

In the town, the population was spread out, with 26.2% under the age of 18, 7.6% from 18 to 24, 30.9% from 25 to 44, 24.4% from 45 to 64, and 10.8% who were 65 years of age or older. The median age was 36 years. For every 100 females, there were 94.1 males. For every 100 females age 18 and over, there were 90.2 males.

The median income for a household in the town was $51,625, and the median income for a family was $57,088. Males had a median income of $40,145 versus $29,788 for females. The per capita income for the town was $21,654. About 7.7% of families and 8.4% of the population were below the poverty line, including 11.6% of those under age 18 and 9.1% of those age 65 or over.

== Economy ==
The town was the site of the first Lloyd's Supercenter. It is home to many retail stores, shopping centers and restaurants, many of which are located along Route 211, in a suburban pattern related to highway development. Both the Galleria at Crystal Run and a Super Wal-Mart are located in the town. The latter replaced Orange Plaza, the first mall constructed in the area.

== Arts and culture ==
The town of Wallkill is home to the Orange County Fair each summer.

== Government ==
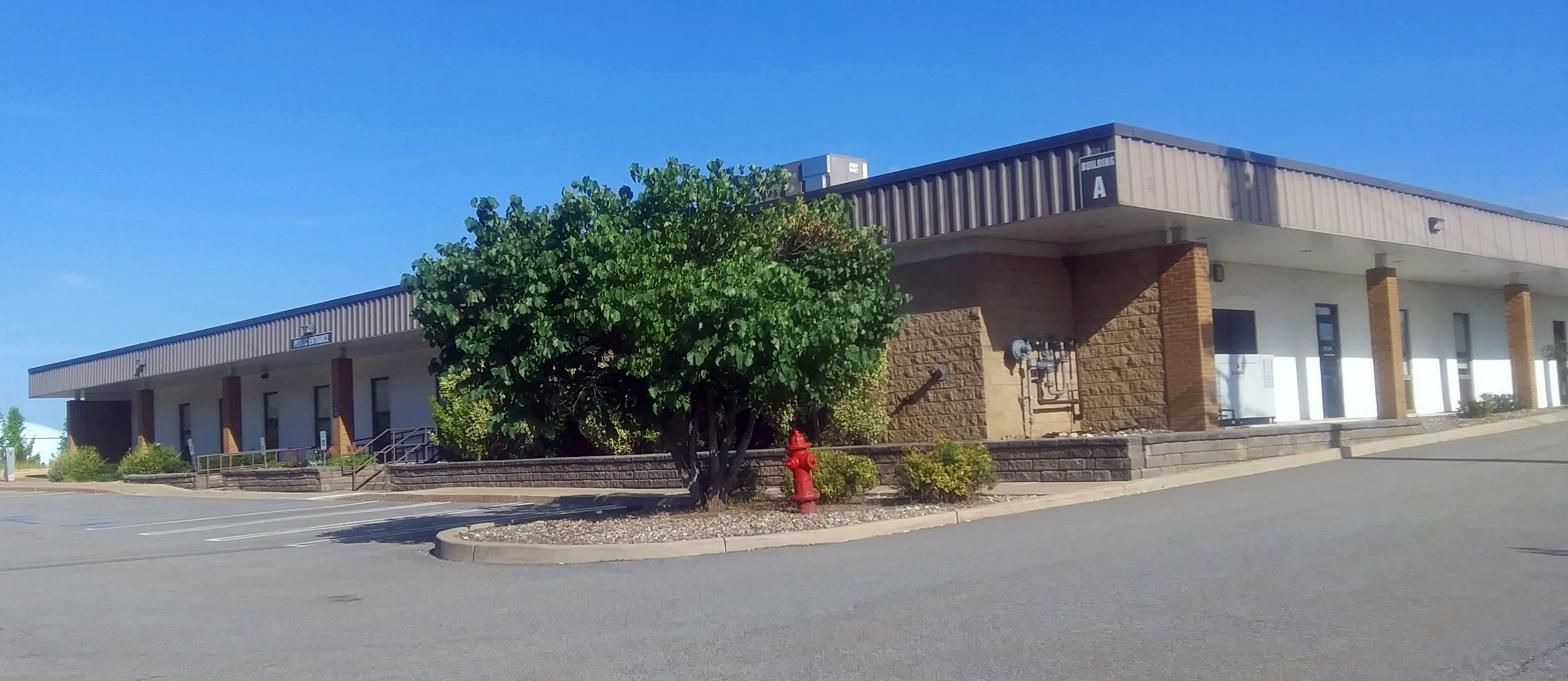
Town hall

The supervisor of the town is Frank Dendanto There are four councilman.

== Infrastructure ==
=== Police department ===
The department has 54 patrol officers, parking enforcement officers, and an animal control officer.

=== Fire departments ===
Wallkill is divided into seven fire districts: Circleville, Howells, Mechanicstown, Silver Lake, Pocatello, Washington Heights, and Bloomingburg.

== Education ==
The Wallkill Central School District operates five schools. It has three elementary schools, one middle school, and one high school.
