= Bullville, New York =

Bullville
- Hamlet
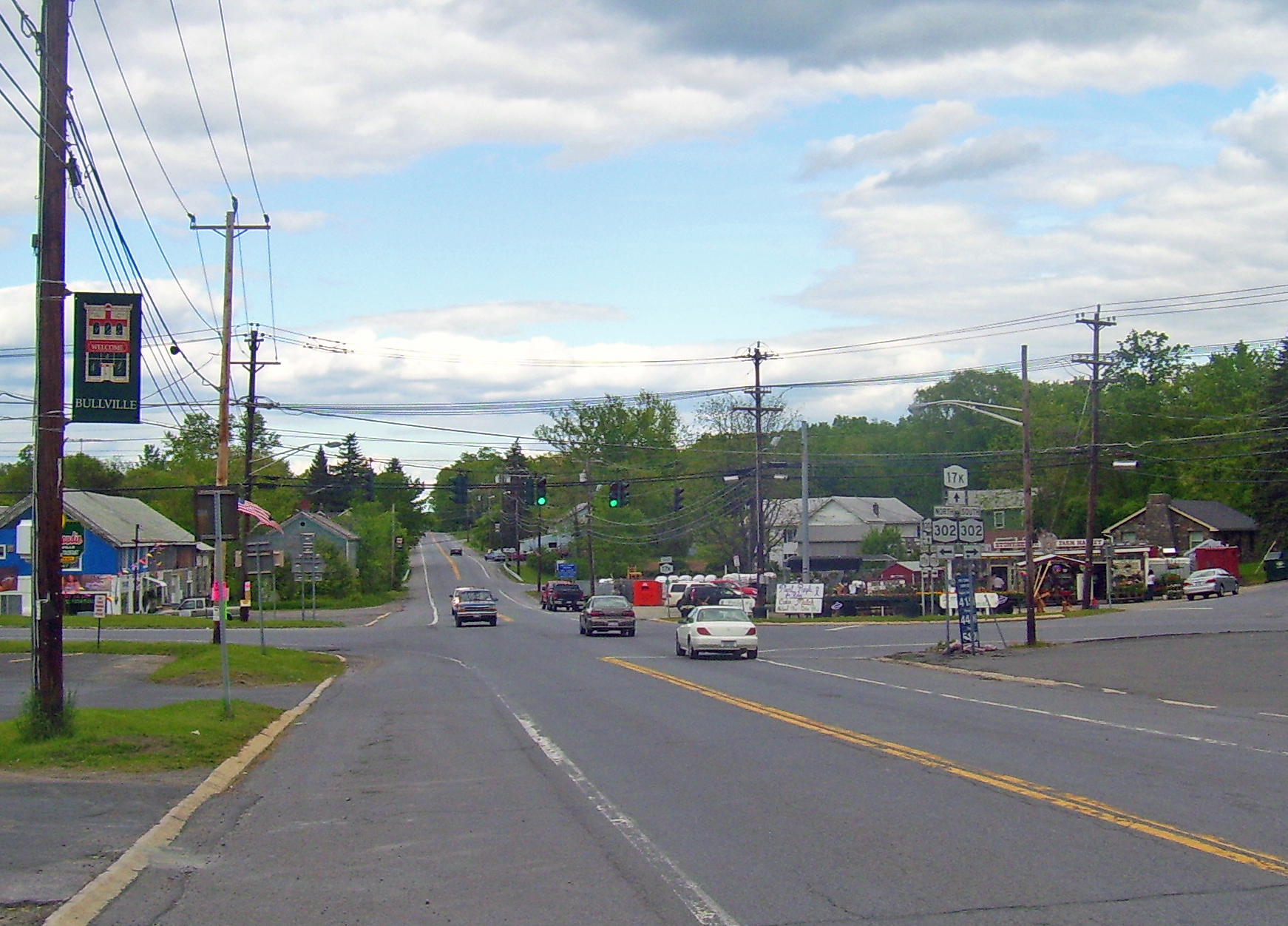
- An image of Downtown Bullville, NY

- Location within New York
- Coordinates: 41°32′N 74°21′W
- Country: United States
- State: New York
- County: Orange
- Time zone: UTC-5 (Eastern (EST))
  - Summer (DST): UTC-4 (EDT)
- ZIP Code: 10915

Bullville is a populated place located in the Town of Crawford in Orange County, New York, United States. It is located at the junction of routes NY-17K and NY-302. Bullville is the site of a United States Post Office and is served by the postal code 10915.

Bullville was one of the original four important settlements in the Town of Crawford.
