= New York State Route 302 =

State highway in Orange County, New York, US

New York State Route 302
- Map of Orange County in southeastern New York with NY 302 highlighted in red

Route information
- Maintained by NYSDOT
- Length: 10.46 mi (16.83 km)
- Existed: 1930–present

Major junctions
- South end: NY 17M in Wallkill
- Future I-86 / NY 17 in Wallkill
- North end: NY 52 in Crawford

Location
- Country: United States
- State: New York
- Counties: Orange

Highway system
- New York Highways; Interstate; US; State; Reference; Parkways
| ← NY 301 | → NY 303 |

New York State Route 302 (NY 302) is a state highway in northern Orange County, New York, in the United States. The southern terminus of the route is at an intersection with NY 17M north of the city of Middletown in the town of Wallkill. Its northern terminus is at a junction with NY 52 in the hamlet of Pine Bush, located within the town of Crawford.

== Route description ==
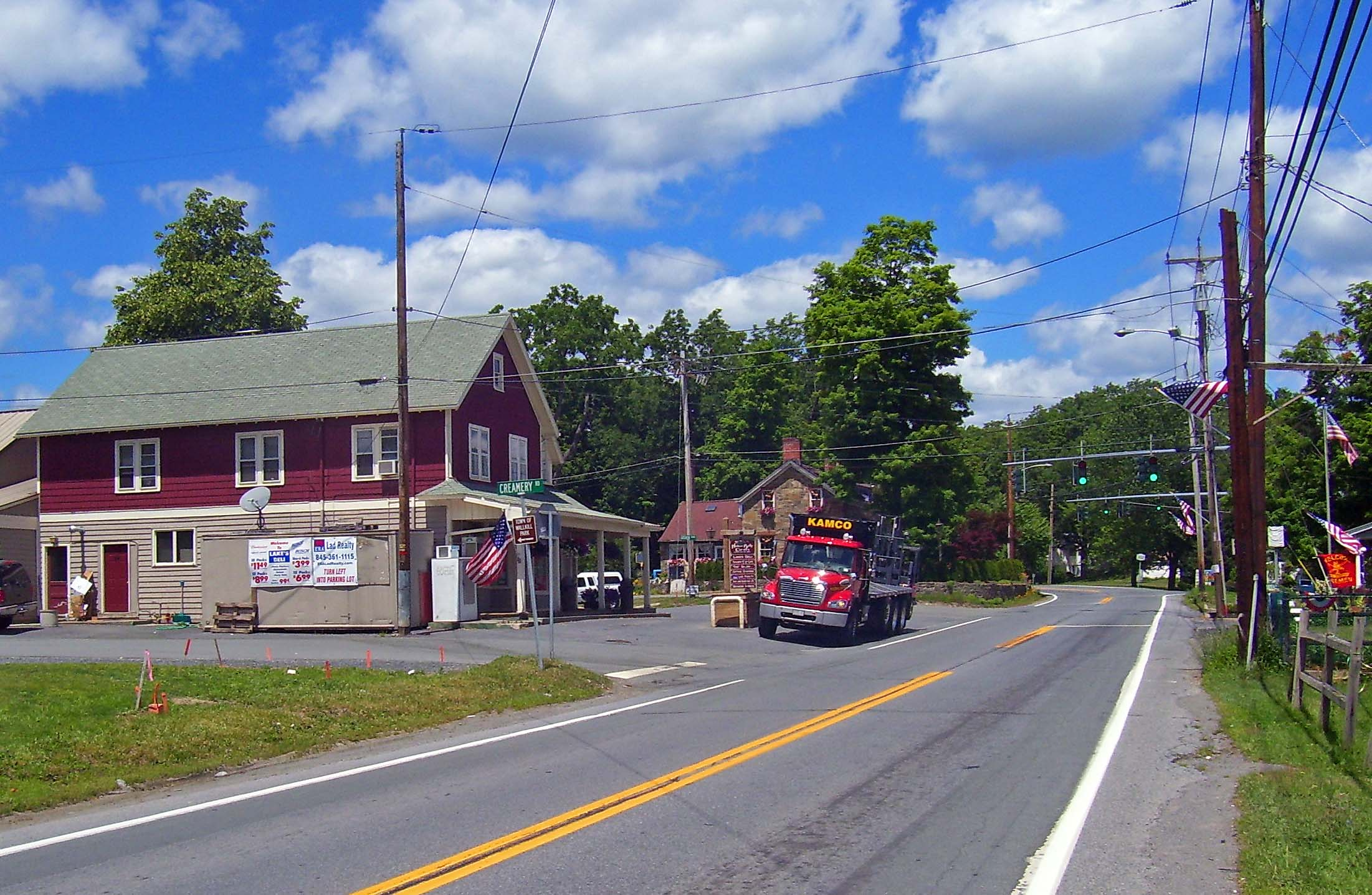
NY 302 north through the hamlet of Circleville

NY 302 begins at an intersection with NY 17M in the hamlet of Rockville within the town of Wallkill. NY 302 proceeds northeast on a two-lane residential road, crossing through the town of Wallkill and over an alignment of the New York, Ontario and Western Railroad just south of a wye for the Erie Railroad's Middletown and Crawford Branch. NY 302 runs northeast into an interchange with the Quickway (NY 17 / future I-86). NY 302 crosses over the freeway as ramps from exit 119 intersect. After NY 17, NY 302 bends northward through a small residential area southwest of the Town of Wallkill Golf Club. At an intersection with Sam Fast Road, NY 302 enters the hamlet of Circleville, passing east of Lake Henneside.

Continuing north out of Circleville, NY 302 runs through the town of Wallkill as a two-lane residential street, passing Heritage Crossing, where it crosses over the former Middletown and Crawford Branch. Continuing on its way northeast into the town of Crawford, where NY 302 enters the hamlet of Bullville. In Bullville, NY 302 is a two-lane commercial roadway, intersecting with NY 17K in the center of the hamlet. At this junction, NY 302 makes a bend to the north, before leaving Bullville and proceeding northeast through the town of Crawford as a two-lane farm road. Paralleling far to the east of the former railroad, NY 302 continues into the hamlet of Thompson Ridge. In Thompson Ridge, NY 302 is a two-lane residential street, junction with the termini of County Route 48 (CR 48) and CR 17 at the same intersection in the center of Thompson Ridge.

After leaving Thompson Ridge, NY 302 continues north through Crawford as a two-lane farm roadway. After passing an intersection with Van Keuren Road, NY 302 bends northward into the hamlet of Pine Bush, where it becomes a two-lane residential street, passing east of Pine Bush High School just after Ulsterville Road. After entering the center of Pine Bush, NY 302 gains the moniker of Maple Avenue, passing Crawford town hall as it bends to the northeast. A few blocks later, NY 302 intersects with NY 52 (Main Street). This intersection marks the northern terminus of NY 302, while Maple Avenue continues north several blocks through Pine Bush town-maintained.

== History ==
NY 302 was assigned as part of the 1930 renumbering of state highways in New York and has not been altered since.

In April 2006 the deaths of four teenagers at Pine Bush High School in two separate accidents along the stretch of 302 between Roberson Avenue and Crans Mill Road just north of Bullville led the school district to ask the state Department of Transportation to do something about what residents considered a deadly stretch of highway. Since all seven of the district's schools are either on or close to the highway, its officials fear that a school bus could be involved in the next fatal accident.

It has claimed other lives in recent years as well, as development has increased in the area. Residents have joined the district in pleading for safety improvements, such as a lower speed limit on the whole road (there are no less than six speed limit changes on a road that is just over ten miles (16 km) long), the removal of large trees close to the roadway, a double yellow line banning passing in the opposite lane (the driver in the April crash had just passed five cars when he was hit), a widening of the stretch (currently only two lanes with passing permitted in either direction) and traffic lights at the intersections with Black Hawk Road and County Route 48.

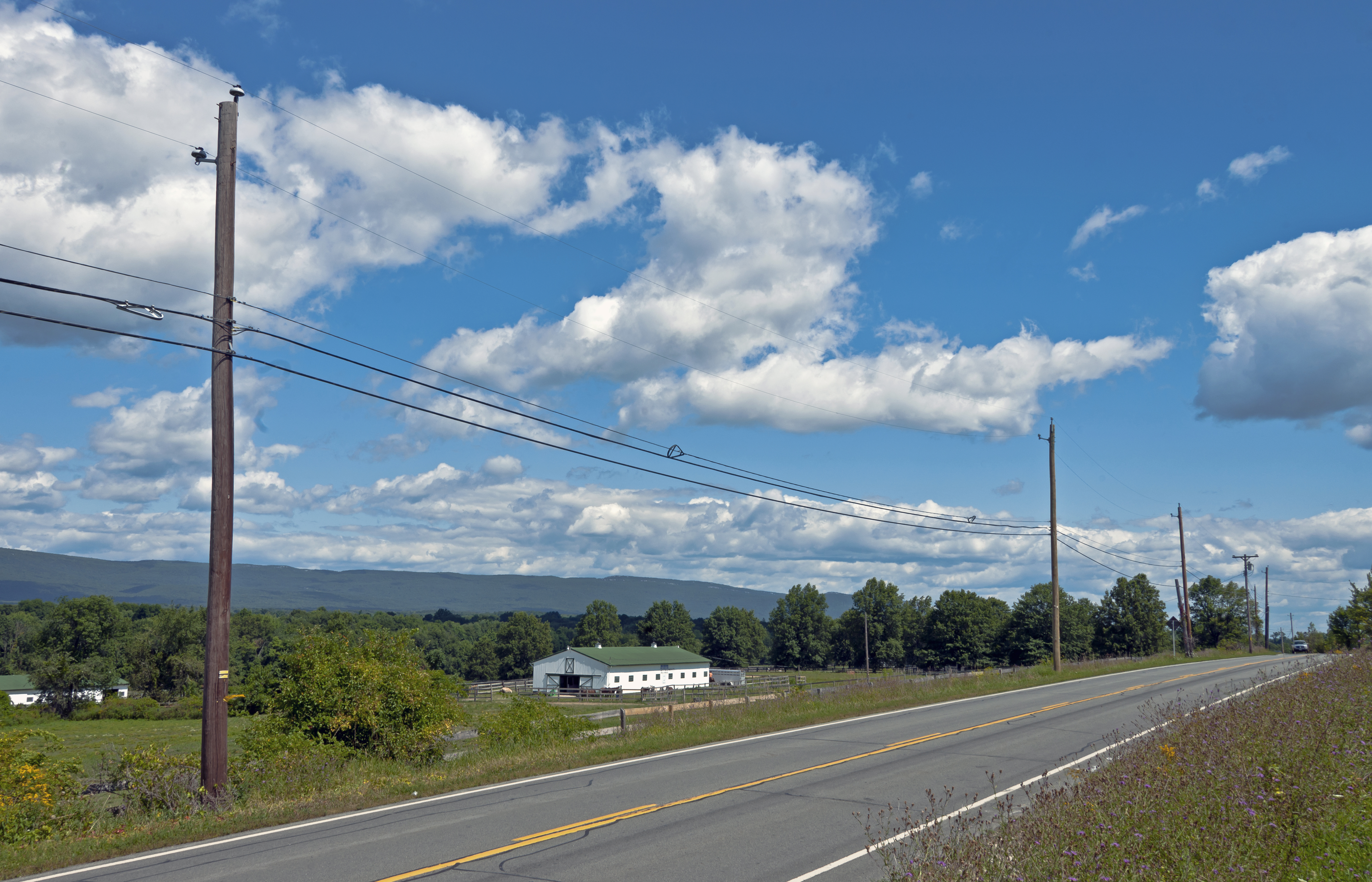
Narrow, two-lane section south of Pine Bush with panoramic view of the Shawangunk Ridge.

Within a week of the deaths, state troopers had put up flashing warning signs at both ends of the segment. The district made available form letters on its website to DOT commissioner Thomas Madison and other elected officials in the region to request the more permanent improvements. However, many in the area said the road was not as much to blame for the accident as the teenaged drivers of the cars that crashed. A DOT study later endorsed that conclusion, although the state said it would make some safety improvements.

Town police began to make their presence felt along the road, stopping traffic at the spot of one of the crashes to check registration and inspection stickers for validity. While that has little to do directly with whatever caused the accidents, they expressed the hope that it would remind drivers the police were on the road and that they should thus be more careful.

In 2017, after the road was repaved between Bullville and Pine Bush, DOT took the unusual step of posting a lower speed limit for northbound traffic as well as increased signage. The Crawford police chief said he expected the improved surface would nonetheless result in more speeding, at least initially. The town board has suggested to DOT that it install a light at the intersection with Ulsterville and Black Hawk roads just south of the high school, and reduce the road's grade into that intersection.

== Major intersections ==
The entire route is in Orange County.

| Location | mi | km | Destinations | Notes |
|---|---|---|---|---|
| Wallkill | 0.00 | 0.00 | NY 17M – Middletown | Hamlet of Rockville |
| Wallkill | 0.68 | 1.09 | Future I-86 / NY 17 – New York City, Binghamton | Exit 119 on the Quickway (NY 17 / future I-86) |
| Crawford | 4.65 | 7.48 | NY 17K – Montgomery, Bloomingburg | Hamlet of Bullville |
| Crawford | 10.46 | 16.83 | NY 52 (Main Street) – Walden, Ellenville | Hamlet of Pine Bush |
1.000 mi = 1.609 km; 1.000 km = 0.621 mi
