= Scotts Corner, New York =

Hamlet in Montgomery, Orange County

Coordinates: 41°31′32″N 74°12′03″W

Scotts Corner is a hamlet in Montgomery, Orange County, New York.

== History ==
The community was named after John F. Scott, the proprietor of a store at the local crossroads. A variant name is "Scott's Corners".
