= Johannes Miller House =

Historic house in New York, United States

- U.S. National Register of Historic Places
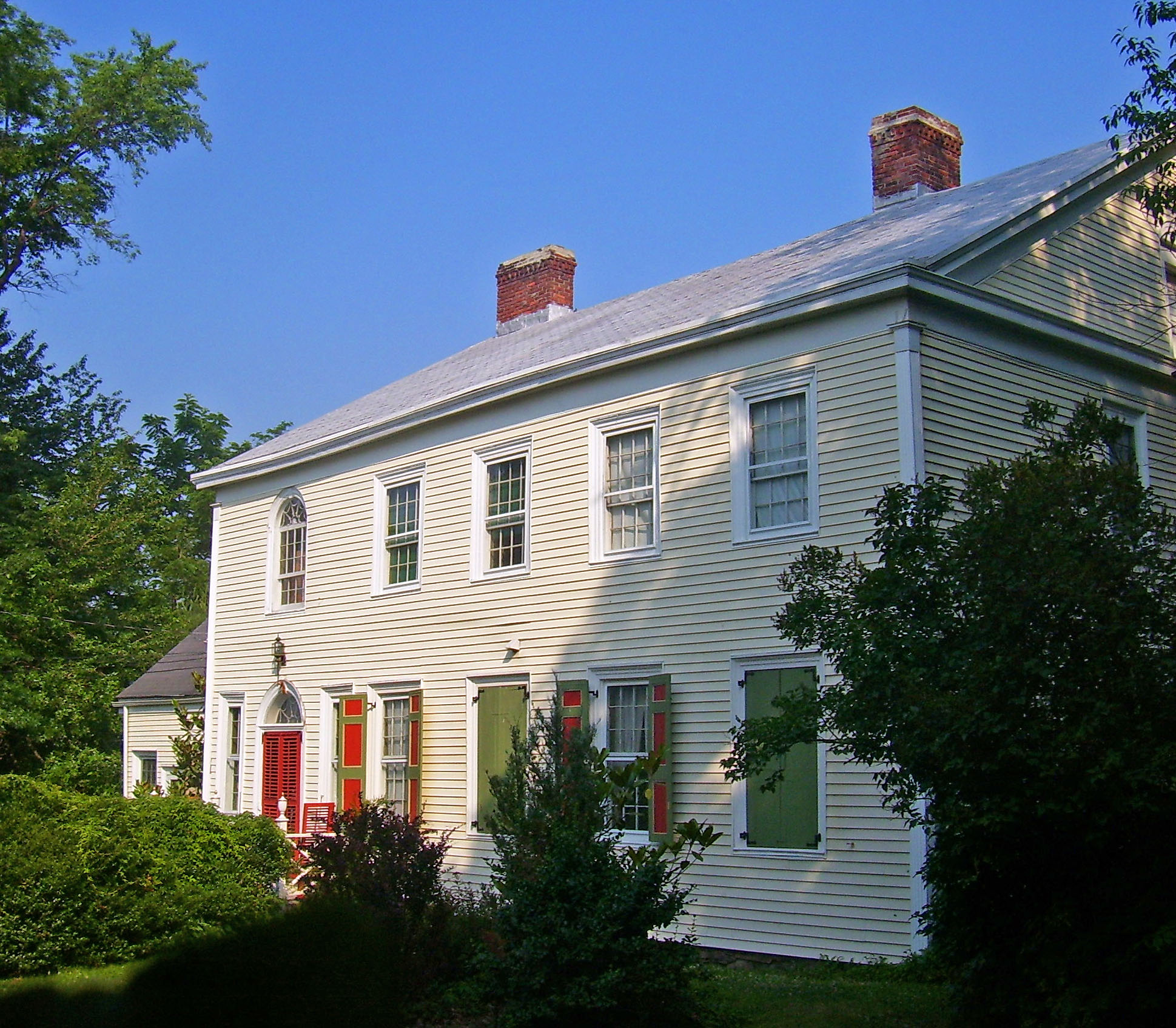
- House in 2007

- Location within New York Location within the United States
- Location: 272 Union St., Town of Montgomery, New York
- Nearest city: Middletown
- Coordinates: 41°30′43″N 74°15′12″W
- Area: 3.2 acres (1.3 ha)
- Built: 1771
- Built by: Hans Smith, Johannes Miller
- Architectural style: Georgian, Federal style, Greek Revival
- MPS: Montgomery Village MRA
- NRHP reference No.: 80002737
- Added to NRHP: November 21, 1980

The Johannes Miller House is a Registered Historic Place in the Orange County, New York, Town of Montgomery. It is located on NY 211 just opposite its junction with NY 416 and another Registered Historic Place, the Harrison Meeting House Site and Cemetery. Orange County Airport is nearby.

It was built originally as a Georgian in 1771 by Hans Smith, one of the early German settlers of the town. Twenty years later, Miller, a prosperous local businessman, acquired it and rebuilt it in the Federal style. In 1835, his descendants added some Greek Revival elements.
