= Harrison Meeting House Site and Cemetery =

Historic cemetery in Orange County, New York, US

- U.S. National Register of Historic Places
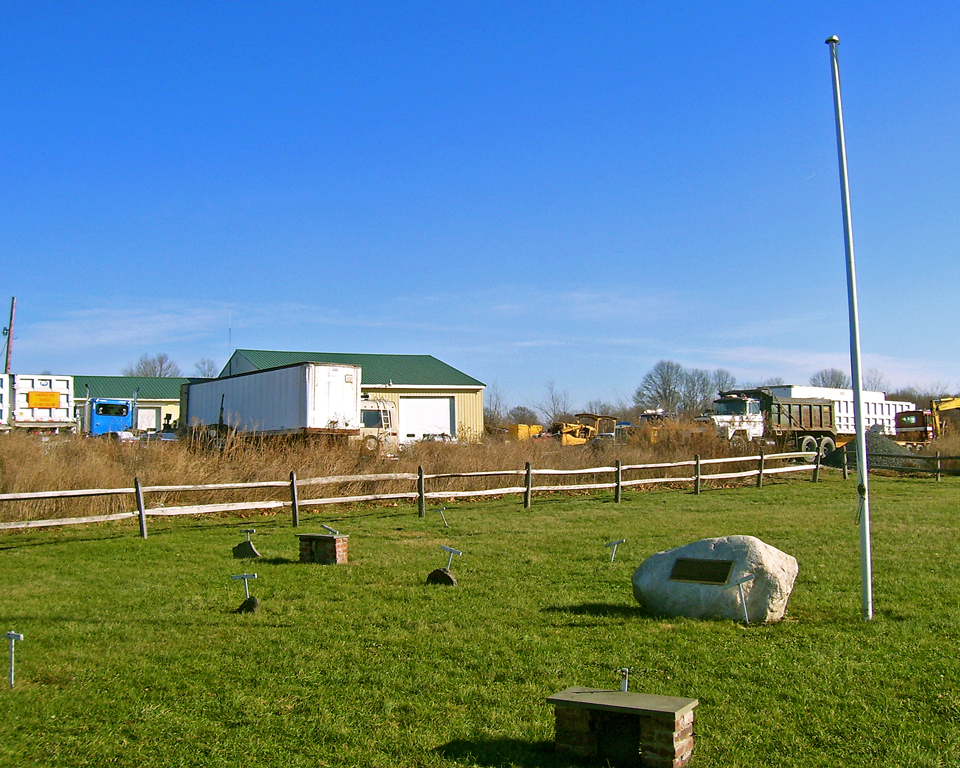
- The cemetery and gravestones

- Location within New York Location within the United States
- Location: Co. Rd. 416, S of jct. of NY 211 and Co. Rd. 416, Montgomery, NY
- Nearest city: Middletown
- Coordinates: 41°30′41″N 74°15′08″W
- Area: less than one acre
- Built: 1727
- NRHP reference No.: 98000133
- Added to NRHP: March 9, 1999

The Harrison Meeting House Site and Cemetery, also known as the Germantown Church Site and Cemetery or just the Germantown Cemetery, is located on New York State Route 416 (NY 416) right at its northern terminus with NY 211, across from Orange County Airport just outside the village of Montgomery, New York.

The first settlers of what would eventually become the Town of Montgomery came here and built their church on this site in the early 18th century. It would later be surrounded with their houses. The church no longer stands, but several of those early settlers are buried within the stone wall around the site. The Town of Montgomery has taken possession after the site was restored from past neglect and added a small interpretive plaque.

It was added to the National Register of Historic Places in 1998.

== See also ==
- National Register of Historic Places listings in Orange County, New York
