= New York State Route 747 =

State highway in Orange County, New York, US

New York State Route 747
- NY 747 highlighted in red

Route information
- Maintained by NYSDOT
- Length: 3.48 mi (5.60 km)
- Existed: 2007–present

Major junctions
- South end: NY 207 in New Windsor
- I-84 in Newburgh
- North end: NY 17K in Montgomery

Location
- Country: United States
- State: New York
- Counties: Orange

Highway system
- New York Highways; Interstate; US; State; Reference; Parkways
← NY 695	→ I-781

New York State Route 747 (NY 747) is a state highway in northeast Orange County, New York, in the United States. The route extends for about 3.5 miles (5.6 km) from NY 207 in the town of New Windsor to NY 17K in the town of Montgomery. It officially came into existence when exit 32 on Interstate 84 was completed and opened in 2007. Most of NY 747 follows Drury Lane, once a highway maintained by Orange County as County Route 54.

The road provides easy access to Stewart International Airport via International Boulevard, a newly built connecting road. The lack of such access has long been seen as an obstacle to the airport's development. The Port Authority of New York and New Jersey has taken the airport over from former private lessees National Express with the intent of realizing long-held hopes of making the airport the New York Metropolitan Area's fourth major airport; improved access to the airport is seen as essential to that goal.

Drury Lane, which divided the airport property from what is now Stewart State Forest, save for a small corridor along the road near the interstate, was long the line in the sand for local environmental activists who opposed any development to its west. Construction of the highway involved significant relocation of some of the route for these and other issues.

== Route description ==
The entire route runs through wooded land that has remained undeveloped since being seized for a planned expansion of the airport in the early 1970s.

NY 747 begins at the junction of Drury Lane and NY 207 near the Grange Hall at the center of the onetime hamlet of Little Britain. A traffic light was installed at the intersection.

It runs as a two-lane expressway along a new alignment through the wooded area between the airport and the state forest. At the junction with International Boulevard, it becomes a four-lane undivided expressway from there to I-84. Here it passes the western end of the airport's main runway, and sometimes large C-5 cargo planes from Stewart Air National Guard Base can be seen taking off right above the road. While one more traffic light has been allowed in this section, development here will likely be limited since much of the land to the west is either wetlands or part of the FAA-mandated Runway Protection Zone, a 45-acre (18 ha) trapezoid in which no building is allowed.

The road climbs slightly into the Town of Newburgh and then to the exit. A new overpass was built; the old one was dismantled. The westbound I-84 exit and entrance takes the form of half of a diamond interchange, while the eastbound exit and entrance forms half of an A2/B2 type partial cloverleaf to avoid encroaching on wetlands in the southwest quadrant of the interchange.

Video of NY 747 from southern terminus to north in 2012

The ramp from I-84 west to NY 747 goes over a small bridge built to protect the Catskill Aqueduct from the vibrations of passing trucks. The presence of the aqueduct, which carries 40% of New York City's water supply and runs right alongside the road just north of I-84, forced the construction of a new section of road a short distance north of the interstate. NY 747 here becomes a two-lane surface road while deviating from the historical route of Drury Lane, bends into the Town of Montgomery and reaches NY 17K, its northern terminus, at the intersection with Stone Castle Road. The section of Stone Castle Road north of Route 17K has itself been slightly relocated to provide for a better location for the intersection, at which another traffic light was erected.

The remaining section of Drury Lane, which has houses and businesses, now ends in a cul-de-sac near the new road and the aqueduct. This small stub of a road remains the outlet for several small private roads which end in cul-de-sacs of their own. A few structures formerly on the west side of Drury Lane now remain on the west side of the renamed NY 747. Despite this plan, a new Valero-branded convenience store and gas station has been opened at the current intersection of NY 17K and Drury Lane to take advantage of interstate traffic coming off the exit.

== History ==
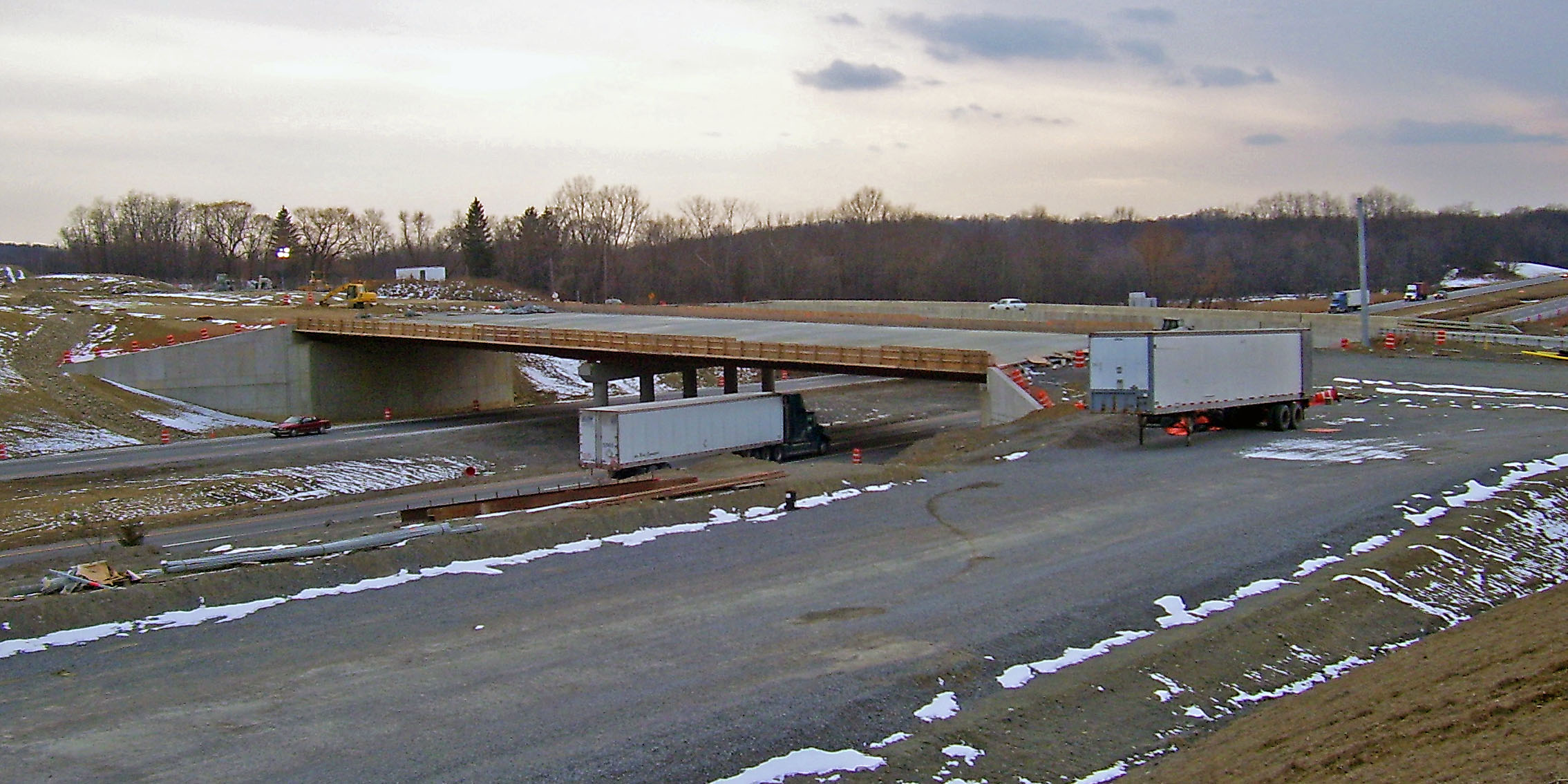
New overpass under construction at I-84 in February 2007

The construction of Route 747 is the culmination of a lengthy regional controversy about the airport and the role it should play in the local economy. Before the 1970 closure of Stewart Air Force Base, Drury Lane was just another two-lane rural north–south route in the farmlands west of the base.

=== Development controversy ===
Plans initiated by then-governor Nelson Rockefeller changed that. With supersonic transport (SST) considered at the time to be the next major development in air travel, Rockefeller wanted New York to have an airport that could handle both the SSTs and regular jets. Accordingly, plans were drawn up for a major expansion of the airport.

The state moved to condemn much of the land between Drury Lane and Maybrook in order to more than double Stewart's size. Families that had lived there since the Revolution fought bitterly. Eventually they were all evicted, but only after the state had promised never to develop the land and American SST development was canceled due to rising fuel costs.

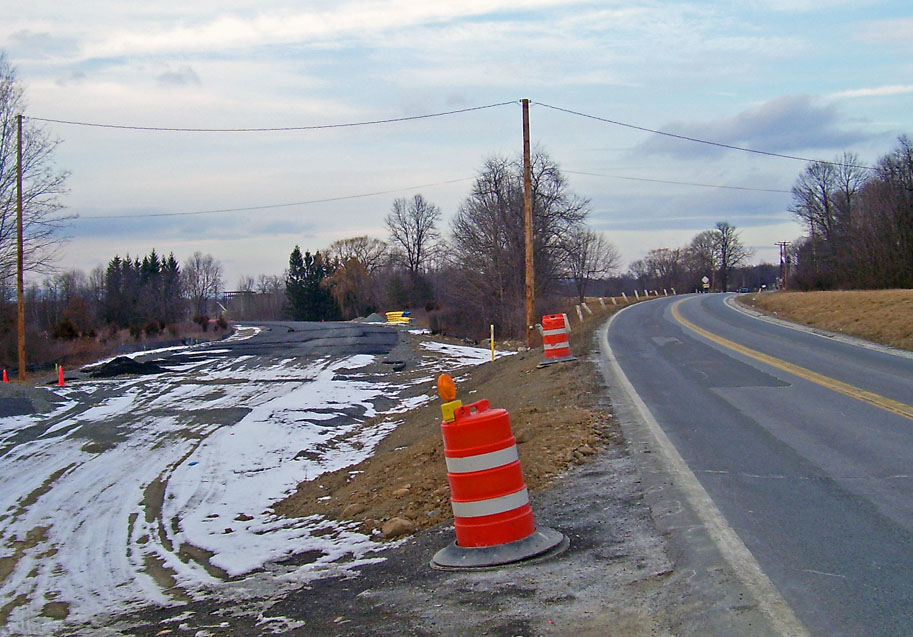
The new route of 747, left, forking from Drury Lane, middle, at the Catskill Aqueduct, right.

In the years that followed, environmental and business activists in the region clashed over what to do with the 7,400 acres (30 km^{2}) west of Drury. The former saw the recreational and conservation possibilities of keeping it a protected area; the latter pointed to ideal real estate in a region that was beginning to lose its job base.

The privatization of the airport in 2000 led the state to finally begin construction of the interchange, after Governor George Pataki designated much of the western lands as Stewart State Forest. It was stalled for three years by a lawsuit filed by several national and local environmental groups alleging that required environmental reviews were not properly conducted. On November 21, 2005, a compromise was reached in which most of the land that had not been designated as part of the state forest was and 400 acres (1.6 km^{2}) near the exit was made available for development. Construction of the exit and the surrounding roads proceeded apace.

=== Construction ===
Drury Lane as it was could not serve to bring the kind of traffic a major airport would handle. The road would have to be widened to at least four lanes and realigned. The presence of the aqueduct also complicated matters greatly. New York City's Department of Environmental Protection insisted that any new roads over the aqueduct bridge it to protect the aging pipeline from damage that vibrations from trucks passing overhead could cause.

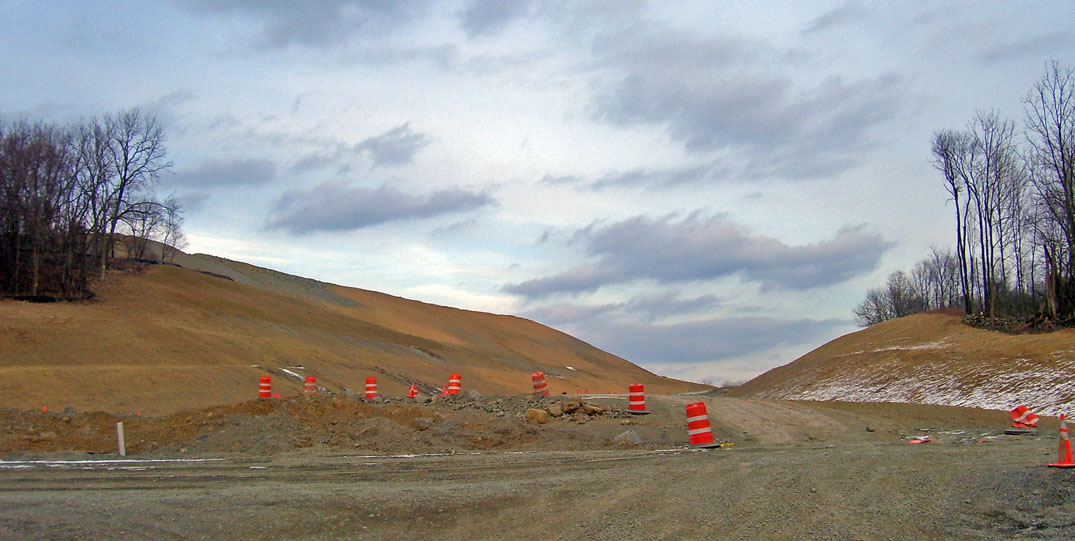
The cut for the new access road.

Since Drury crosses the aqueduct north of the interstate on relatively level ground, a bridge would have added considerable expense to the project. However, a federally required 1999 value engineering study recommended instead rerouting Drury to make a four-way intersection at Stone Castle Road and Route 17K. While at the time there were some other issues seen as holding this up, eventually this was the option chosen.

The access road required some deep cuts to keep it level at the intersection with Drury Lane. Bill Gorton, NYSDOT's regional design engineer, compared it to the initial construction of I-84. "We tell our young engineers to take a good look at what we're doing here because chances are they won't see anything like this again in their careers", said Rashid Shariff, DOT's engineer in charge. Over 1,000,000 cubic yards (760,000 m^{3}) of dirt were moved. A quarter of that was used to fill a ravine the road crosses; the rest will be used as needed on the airport property.

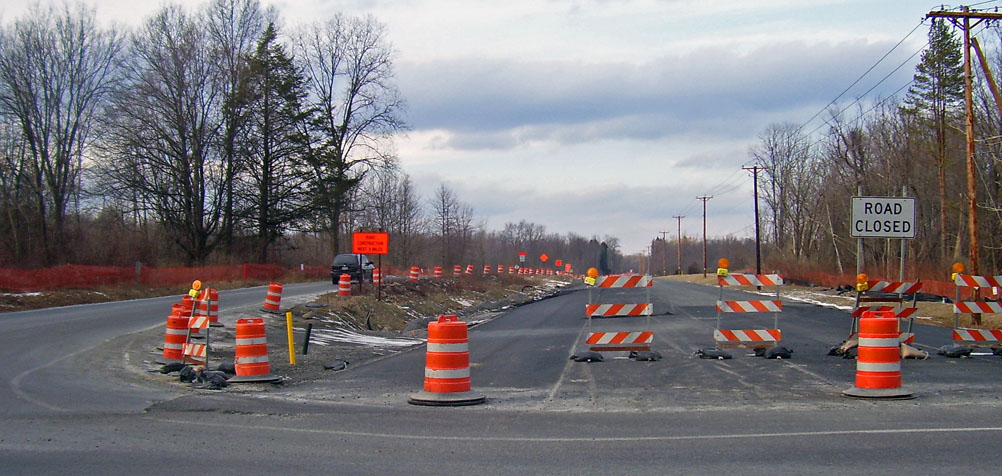
Southern terminus as of 2007. Old route on left; current route being constructed on right

The project's design took into account several considerations for rare or endangered species native to the area, which earned it an Exemplary Ecosystem Initiative award from the Federal Highway Administration. These included the construction of 12 vernal pools adjacent to the road to provide habitat for the Blue-spotted Salamander and Jefferson Salamander and box culverts to allow them to safely cross under the road, avoiding tree removal during the season when Indiana bats are roosting, and siting new wetlands to avoid impacting Purple milkweed.

Prior to the project, Drury Lane had been maintained by Orange County as County Route 54. In February 2007, it was announced that the highway would become state-maintained and be designated as NY 747 once the project was completed. On July 30, 2007, Route 747 was de facto open. Drury Lane was closed off north of the aqueduct and traffic was routed onto the new roadway between both termini, and on the new overpass. Road crews began removing the pavement from the former roadbed and dismantling the old overpass.

The 1.25-mile (2.01 km) long east–west airport access road from Route 747 to the main terminal, International Boulevard, was opened on November 20, 2007, officially completing the $55 million project. Although NYSDOT refers to this access road as Stewart Boulevard in their press release, all area signage refers to the access road as International Boulevard, a last-minute change by the Port Authority of New York and New Jersey.

== Major intersections ==
The entire route is in Orange County.

Location	mi	km	Destinations	Notes
New Windsor	0.00	0.00	NY 207 – Vails Gate, Newburgh, Rock Tavern, Campbell Hall	Southern terminus; at-grade intersection; hamlet of Little Britain
New Windsor	1.26	2.03	International Boulevard – Stewart Airport	At-grade intersection
Town of Newburgh	2.45	3.94	I-84 to I-87 / New York Thruway	Exit 32 on I-84
Town of Newburgh	2.45	3.94	Northern end of limited-access section	
Town of Montgomery	3.48	5.60	NY 17K – Montgomery, Newburgh	Northern terminus
1.000 mi = 1.609 km; 1.000 km = 0.621 mi

== See also ==
- List of county routes in Orange County, New York
