= John A. Crabtree House =

Historic house in New York, United States

- U.S. National Register of Historic Places
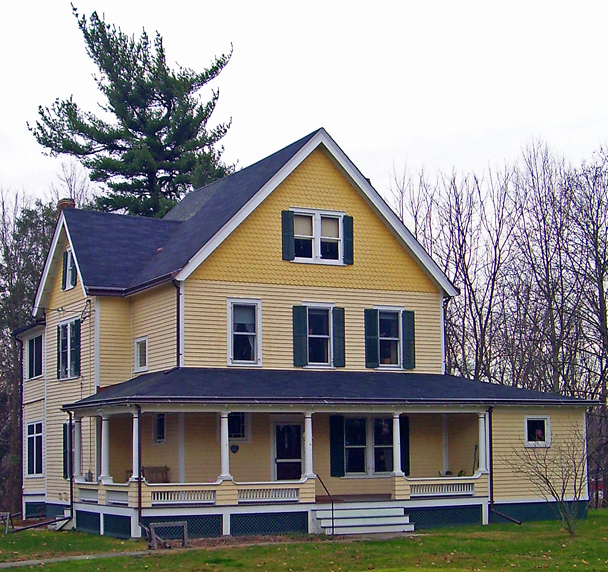
- The house in late 2006

- Location within New York Location within the United States
- Location: 15 Factory St., Montgomery, NY
- Nearest city: Newburgh
- Coordinates: 41°31′43″N 74°13′36″W
- Area: less than one acre
- Built: 1899
- Built by: Chauncy Brooks
- Architect: Keith, W.J.
- Architectural style: Queen Anne
- NRHP reference No.: 98001001
- Added to NRHP: August 6, 1998

The John A. Crabtree House is a historic house located at 15 Factory Street in the village of Montgomery, Orange County, New York.

== Description and history ==
It is a 2 1/2-story, Queen Anne style frame dwelling with a cross-gable roof. It features a wraparound porch and fishscale shingles on the gable ends. It is a short distance from the Montgomery Worsted Mills, co-owned by Crabtree and his partner Arthur Patchett, who also lived nearby. The house had been built by Crabtree's father William, and remained in the family for a long time.

It was added to the National Register of Historic Places on August 6, 1998.
