= Ward's Bridge =

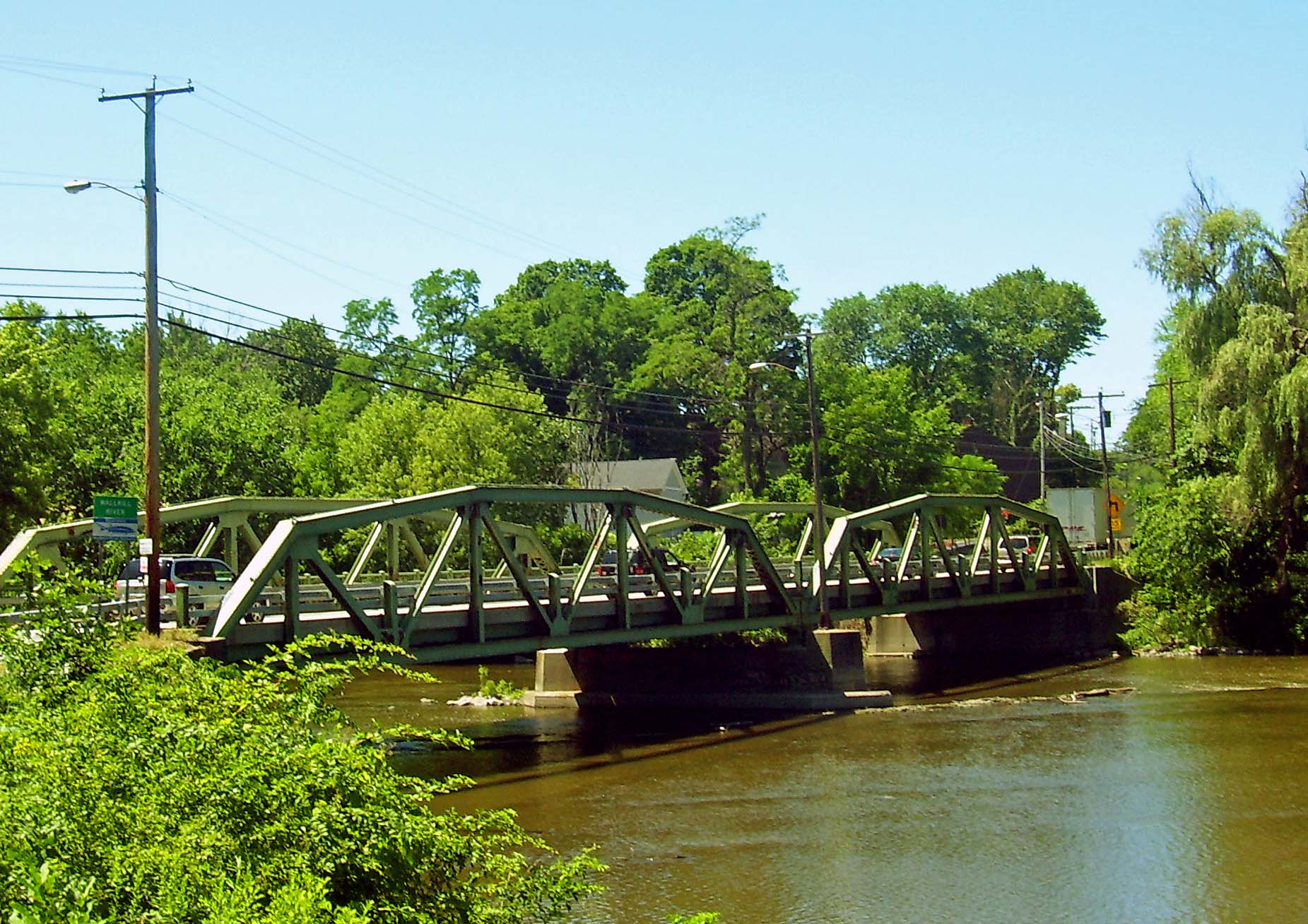
- Bridge viewed looking downriver
- Coordinates: 41°31′44″N 74°14′18″W
- Carries: Two lanes of NY 17K
- Crosses: Wallkill River
- Locale: Montgomery, NY
- Maintained by: New York State Department of Transportation
- ID number: 000000001014500

Characteristics
- Design: Through truss
- Total length: 231 feet (70 m)
- Width: 22 feet (6.7 m)
- Load limit: 53 tons (48 tonnes)

History
- Opened: 1940

Statistics
- Daily traffic: 10,448

Ward's Bridge carries NY 17K across the Wallkill River at the western end of the village of Montgomery in Orange County, New York, United States. It is named, as its predecessors were, for James Ward, an early settler in the area who established his grist mill on what is now the village side and built the first bridge in the mid-18th century. Originally, Montgomery was even called Ward's Bridge, and today a nearby restaurant calls itself the Ward's Bridge Inn.

The mill has long since been demolished, but the earliest buildings in the village that were built around it still stand and are now the Bridge Street Historic District, listed on the National Register of Historic Places. Another Registered Historic Place, the Daniel Waring House, is located at the corner of 17K and River Road on the western side.

The current bridge, a steel through truss, is 231 feet (70 m) long, with a 22-foot (6.7 m) roadway and small sidewalk on the eastern (downriver) side. It was built in 1940, and renovated in 1982.

== Traffic patterns ==
Traffic on the bridge is very heavy at rush hour, since the bridge is the main connection for travel between two regions of the county. The combination of nearby intersections and the layout of Route 17K through the area. The western approach funnels vehicles from the northwest, via county highways like Albany Post Road and River Road (the direct route between Montgomery and Walden). Both terminate at 17K within a quarter-mile (400 m) of the bridge. Within the same distance to the east, in the village, there is the traffic light at the north end of NY 211, which connects Montgomery to Middletown and Goshen, via NY 416.

Route 17K also bends sharply as it intersects both highways to the west, then takes a 90-degree turn onto Ward Street as it enters the village and encounters the light, for eastbound traffic the first since Bullville, six miles (9.7 km) to the west. Both turns slow traffic approaching in either direction, and it in turn backs up drivers on Albany Post and River roads trying to make left turns on 17K.

These issues were aggravated between 2003 and 2005, when the construction of the Walden Veterans' Memorial Bridge downstream led the state Department of Transportation to detour truck traffic to 17K, since the Walden Low Bridge could not handle the prolonged heavy loads.
