= Union Street–Academy Hill Historic District =

Historic district in New York, United States

- Union Street–Academy Hill; Historic District
- U.S. National Register of Historic Places
- U.S. Historic district
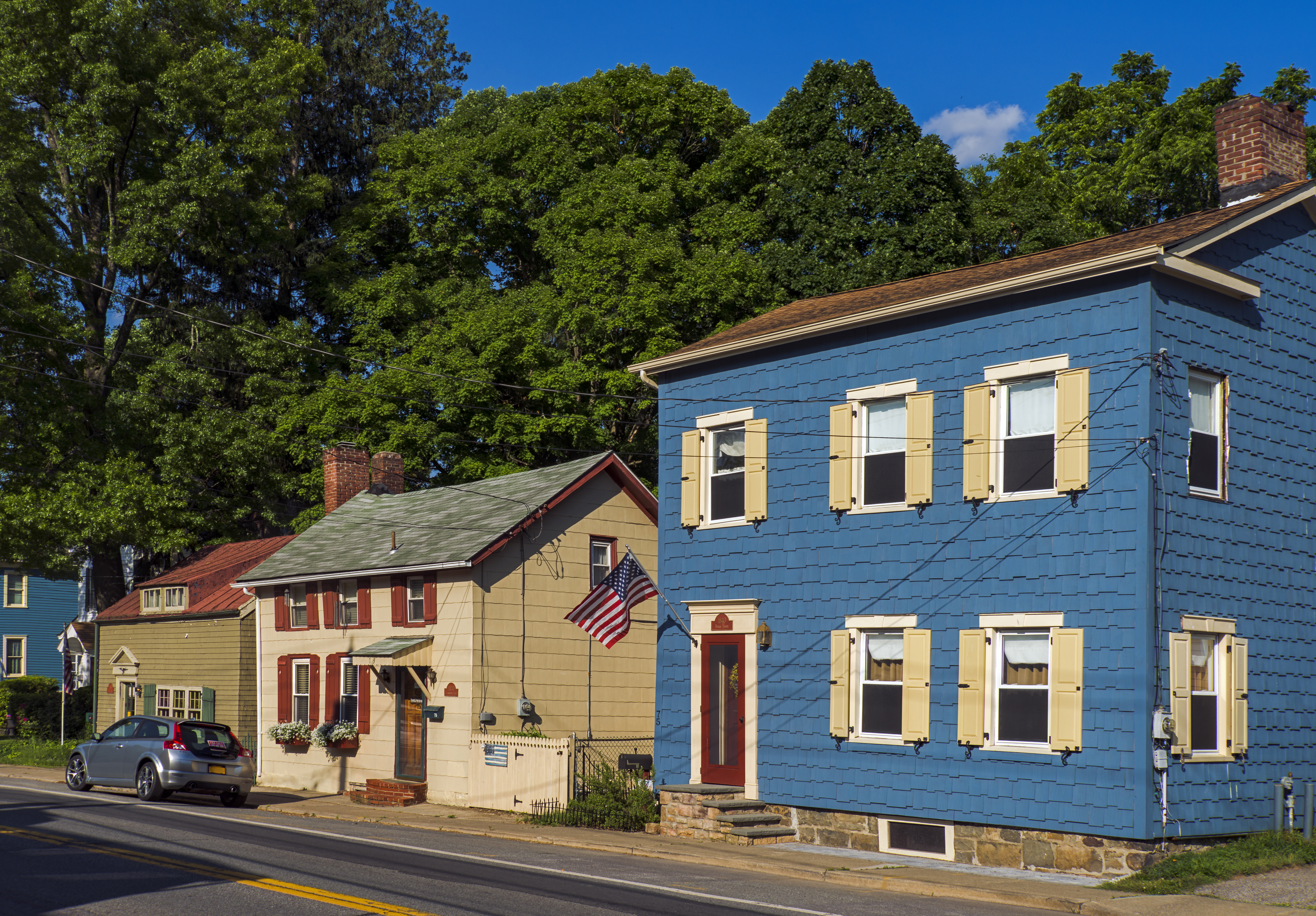
- Houses along Union Street, 2018, with 1750 Smith Tavern at left

- Location within New York Location within the United States
- Location: Roughly bounded by Ward St., Wallkill Ave., Sears and Hanover Sts., Montgomery, New York
- Coordinates: 41°31′31″N 74°14′18″W
- Area: 30 acres (12 ha)
- Built: 19th century
- Architectural style: Federal style, Queen Anne, Greek Revival
- MPS: Montgomery Village MRA
- NRHP reference No.: 80004395
- Added to NRHP: November 21, 1980

The Union Street–Academy Hill Historic District makes up most of downtown Montgomery, New York, United States. It abuts the smaller Bridge Street Historic District to the northwest. The district has been on the National Register of Historic Places since November 21, 1980.

The district is roughly bounded by Hanover Street, one block west of Union Street (NY 211), Ward Street (NY 17K) on the north, Wallkill Avenue to the east and Sears Street to the south. The 300-acre (1.2 km^{2}) rectangle-shaped historic district contains 83 buildings, many of them houses that date to the early and mid-19th century and exemplify popular contemporary architectural styles.

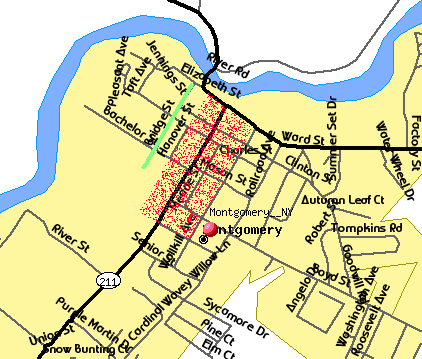
Map of Montgomery with Union Street-Academy Hill district in red and Bridge Street in green.

The centerpiece of the historic district is the Village Hall, the former Montgomery Academy, which dates to the 1830s. Its location on a slight rise gave its name to the rise and, later, the historic district.

== See also ==
- National Register of Historic Places listings in Orange County, New York
