= Patchett House =

Historic house in New York, United States

- U.S. National Register of Historic Places
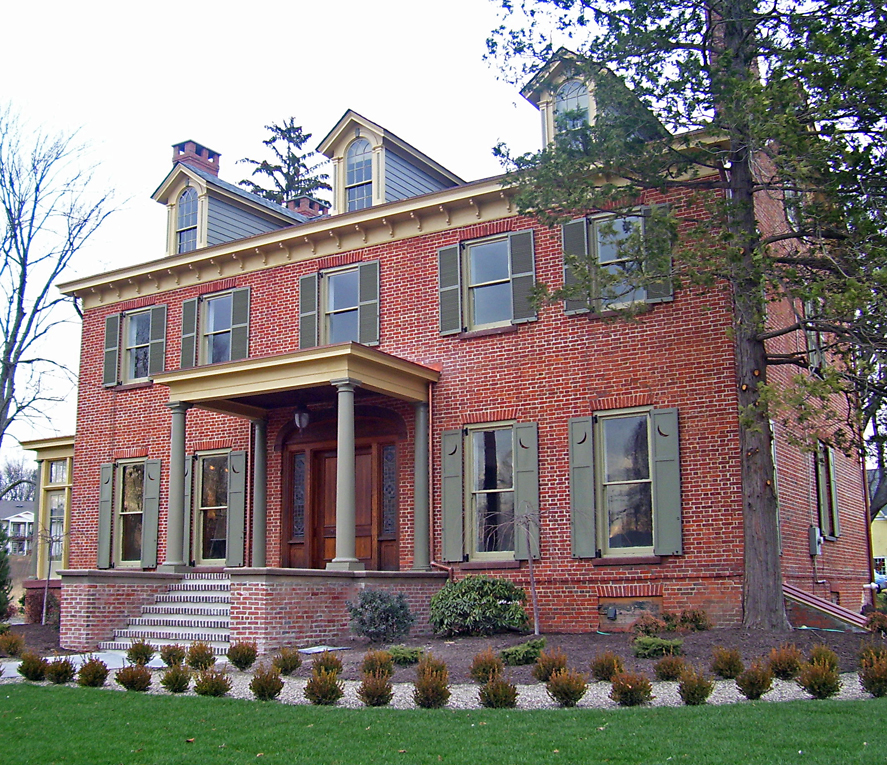
- The home in late 2006
- Location: Montgomery, NY
- Nearest city: Newburgh
- Coordinates: 41°31′33″N 74°13′40″W
- Architectural style: Federal Style, Late Victorian, Colonial Revival
- NRHP reference No.: 80004394
- Added to NRHP: 1980

The Patchett House is located at Ward Street (NY 17K), on the junction with Factory Street, in Montgomery, New York. It was originally built in the early 19th century as a tavern serving travelers on the Newburgh–Cochecton Turnpike, whose eastern half 17K follows today.

Arthur Patchett, at the time co-owner of the Montgomery Worsted Mills at the end of Factory Street on the Wallkill River, moved into the house sometime in the 1890s. His family continued living there until the 1970s.

The house was added to the National Register of Historic Places in 1980. Later on, though, it remained vacant and by the end of the century had fallen into serious neglect and disrepair. In 2005, serious renovations were undertaken and today the house looks as good as new. The most recent tenants are the nonprofit artist's environmental cooperative Wallkill River School.

A nearby townhouse complex is named Patchett Crossing. The Montgomery Water Works, built on land originally owned by the Patchetts, stands almost just across 17K, and the Orange County Choppers production facility is just up the street.
