= Daniel Waring House =

Historic house in New York, United States

- U.S. National Register of Historic Places
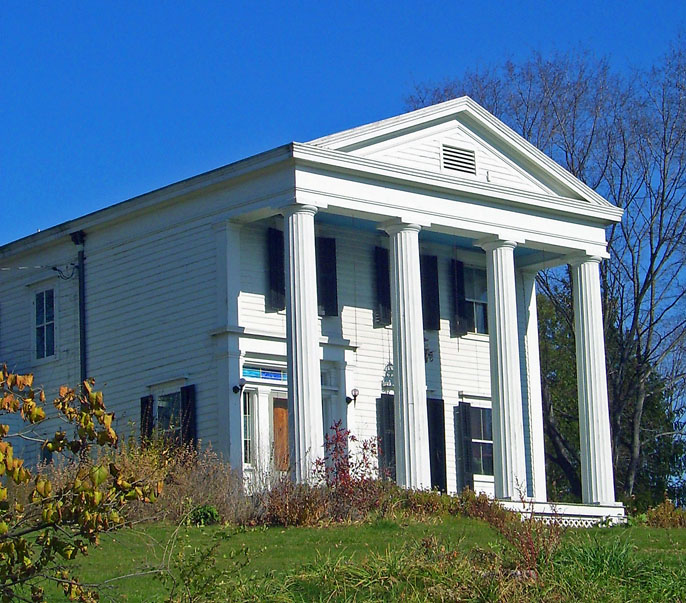
- South elevation and partial west profile, 2006
- Location: Town of Montgomery, NY
- Nearest city: Newburgh
- Coordinates: 41°31′45″N 74°14′11″W
- Area: 1.5 acres (6,100 m^{2})
- Built: 1844
- NRHP reference No.: 95001285
- Added to NRHP: 1995

The Daniel Waring House, also known as Indian Hill, is located on River Road (Orange County Route 29) just outside the village of Montgomery, New York, United States. It sits on a large parcel of land overlooking the Wallkill River at the junction of River Road and NY 17K, just opposite the western approach to Ward's Bridge.

It is believed that part of the house dates to the 18th century. Waring, a later resident, had the four-column temple-style Greek Revival front section built in the 1840s. It has been occupied since his time and remains a private residence. In 1995 it was listed on the National Register of Historic Places, along with several other buildings and structures on the property. The current resident, a former town supervisor, purchased the property from Richard James and Dora Holvey in 1998.

== Property ==
The house sits on a 1.5-acre (0.61 ha) triangular lot on both sides of River Road. It slopes to the north and is elevated above grade level enough to provide good views of the river, bridge, and village across. A stone retaining wall, with a set of entrance steps in the middle, along the front of the property is a contributing structure to the listing. A modern swimming pool at the rear is not included. Nor are the ruins of two old mills in the steep sloping ground between the road and the river. Contributing outbuildings include a privy, wellhouse near the house and a large garage/barn to the east. There are other houses on the east and a woodlot on the west.

Indian Hill itself is a two-story, three-bay clapboard-sided frame house on a raised stone foundation. On the main block is a gabled roof with two large brick chimneys on the east side. There are wings on the side and rear.

The south (front) facade has four fluted Doric columns. A plain frieze runs around the main block's roofline. The main entrance, on the west end, has sidelights and a transom surrounded by flat pilasters supporting the cornice above it. A single raised panel is above both front windows. All windows have louvered shutters.

On the sides are two gabled one-story wings. A one-story kitchen wing, with a gable and chimney, projects from the rear, connecting to a two-story rear extension.

Inside, the house retains much of its original finish. A molded plaster cornice runs through most of the first floor rooms and the second-story hall. In the parlor and dining room, more flat pilasters support the cornice. Architraves surround the paneled field around each window.

The main stairway features a mahogany rail with a turned newel post and balusters. Both first and second floors have marble mantels, black and white respectively, unusual for Greek Revival houses in the area. The beehive oven in the kitchen wing still has its original cast iron door.

The most conspicuous contributing building is the barn/garage, a one-and-a-half-story frame structure with rear ell on the east side of a carport at the end of the unpaved driveway. The privy is on the other side of the driveway, and the wellhouse on the south side, near the stone retaining wall.

== History ==
Amy Eliza Crist, a descendant of one of the earliest families to settle the land around today's Montgomery, sold the 16 acres (6.5 ha) that include the current house property to Waring, a successful local miller, for $4,764 ($165,000 in current dollars). Waring lived in a still-extant house on Clinton Street in the village at the time, and stored the lumber for the house he planned to build on the property in one of his own rear outbuildings. It burned, prolonging the construction of the house.

The Crists had built the first mills on the future Waring property, and local tradition holds that the kitchen wing was left over from one of the Crist houses. Waring's use of not only the Greek Revival style, but a very high application of the style featuring the only colonnade on a Greek Revival house in the Town of Montgomery, with lavish interior decor reflects his prosperity and taste. The stone wall was part of the original house plan.

He died in 1881, leaving the house to his daughter and son-in-law, Sarah and Thomas Stratton. The son-in-law had bought a large gristmill across the Wallkill from the house, and ran it until it became unprofitable around 1900. During the Strattons' time in the house, the privy and wellhouse were added.

Stratton sold it to a Charles Kaune in 1911. He added the large barn, later to be used as a garage, around 1920. Throughout the rest of the 20th century it passed through a succession of owners. Two of them, in the 1970s and 1990s, restored the house. The latter, Susan Cockburn, was later elected to two terms as Montgomery's town supervisor, the first woman to hold the position.

== See also ==
- National Register of Historic Places listings in Orange County, New York
