= Montgomery Water Works =

- Montgomery Water Works (New York)
- U.S. National Register of Historic Places
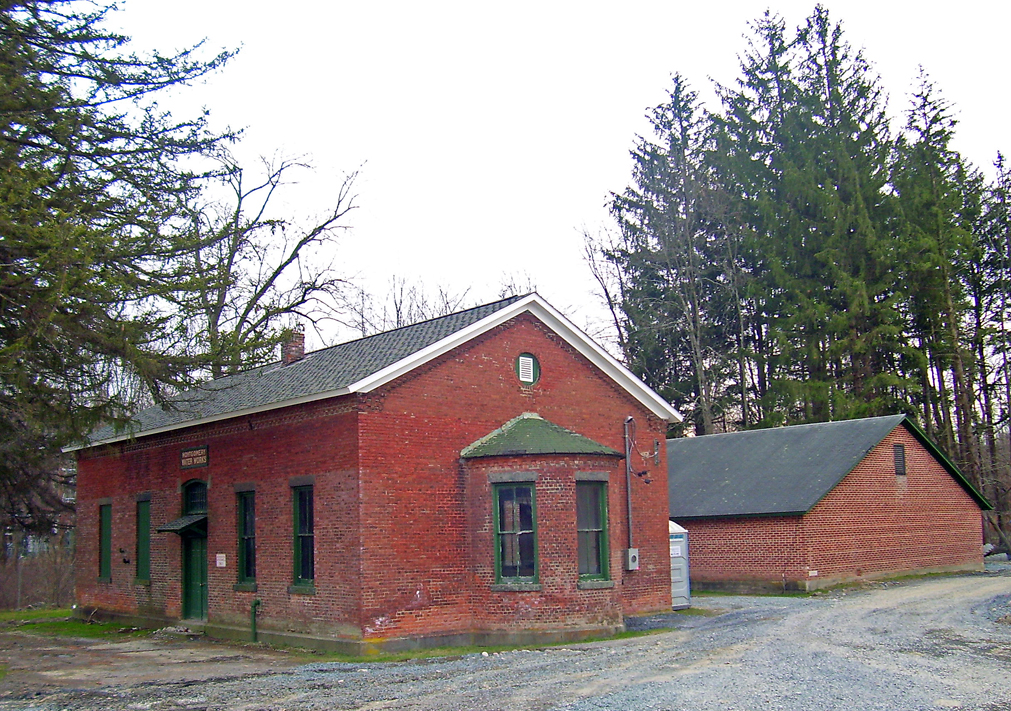
- The Montgomery Water Works
- Location: Montgomery, NY
- Nearest city: Newburgh
- Coordinates: 41°31′31″N 74°13′36″W
- Built: 1895
- Architect: Chauncey Brooks
- Architectural style: Late Victorian
- NRHP reference No.: 05000019
- Added to NRHP: 2005

The Montgomery Water Works is located along NY 17K in the village of Montgomery, New York. The two small brick buildings were built in 1895 on land sold to the village by Arthur Patchett, whose own house still stands across the road.

It was added to the National Register of Historic Places in 2005. As of 2007 a new senior housing development has been built near the water works. Workers had to take care to avoid damage to the building.
