= Bull-Jackson House =

Historic house in New York, United States

- U.S. National Register of Historic Places
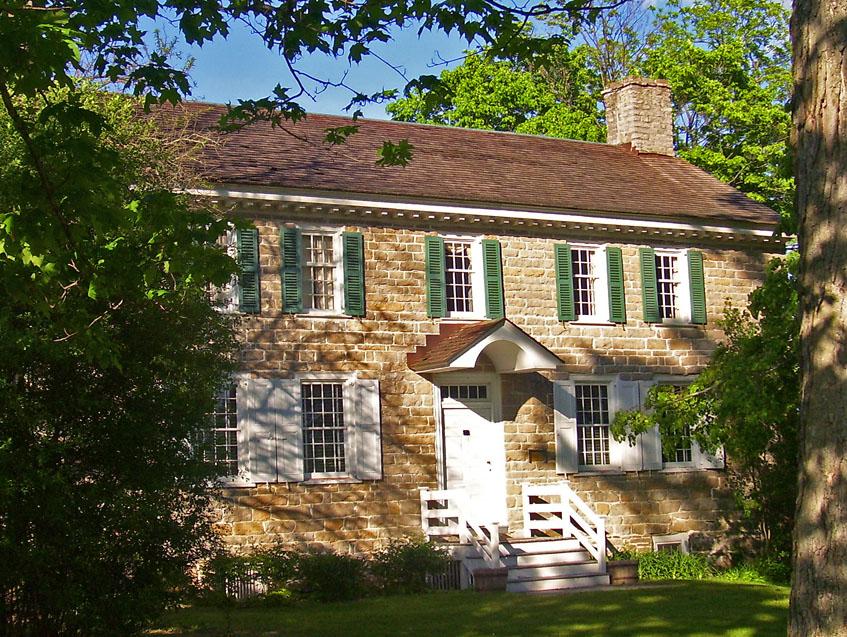
- House in 2007

- Location within New York Location within the United States
- Location: NY 416, northwest of Campbell Hall, Campbell Hall, NY
- Nearest city: Middletown
- Coordinates: 41°27′59″N 74°16′23″W
- Area: 189 acres (76 ha)
- Built: 1769
- Built by: Bull, Thomas
- NRHP reference No.: 74001288
- Added to NRHP: May 17, 1974

The Bull-Jackson House, also known as Hill-Hold Museum, is located on NY 416 in the town of Hamptonburgh in Orange County, New York. It has been on the National Register of Historic Places since May 17, 1974.

The stone structure was built in 1769 by early settler Thomas Bull, who also gave his name to the county's largest park, just across Route 416. Orange County took possession of the house from the last of Bull's direct descendants in the late 1960s, and today it and the surrounding farmstead is operated as a museum of early life in the region.

The museum grounds contain a summer kitchen, a one-room school house, a smoke house, farms animals and gift shop.

Thomas Bull, mason, also built Knox's Headquarters State Historic Site in Vails Gate, New York.
