= John Crabtree =

John Crabtree may refer to:

- John Crabtree (businessman), lawyer, businessman and Lord Lieutenant of the West Midlands of England
- John F. Crabtree, namesake of Crabtree, California, homesteader
- John A. Crabtree, owner of John A. Crabtree House
- John J. Crabtree, namesake of Crabtree, Oregon, pioneer from Virginia

== See also ==
- Jack Crabtree (disambiguation)
