= New York State Route 207 =

State highway in Orange County, New York, US

New York State Route 207
- Map of Orange County in southeastern New York with NY 207 highlighted in red

Route information
- Maintained by NYSDOT and the city of Newburgh
- Length: 19.10 mi (30.74 km)
- Existed: 1930–present

Major junctions
- West end: Future I-86 / US 6 / NY 17 / NY 17M / NY 17A in Goshen
- NY 416 at Campbell Hall; NY 208 in Maybrook; NY 747 in New Windsor; NY 300 in New Windsor
- East end: NY 17K in Newburgh

Location
- Country: United States
- State: New York
- Counties: Orange

Highway system
- New York Highways; Interstate; US; State; Reference; Parkways
← NY 206	→ NY 208

New York State Route 207 (NY 207) is a 19.10-mile-long (30.74 km) east–west state highway located entirely within Orange County, New York, in the United States. It serves as a connector between the village of Goshen and the city of Newburgh. It has for a long time provided the main access to Stewart International Airport. The highway follows the path of the old Goshen–Newburgh Turnpike and is a two-lane road through its entire length. It is also shared with New York State Bicycle Route 17.

== Route description ==
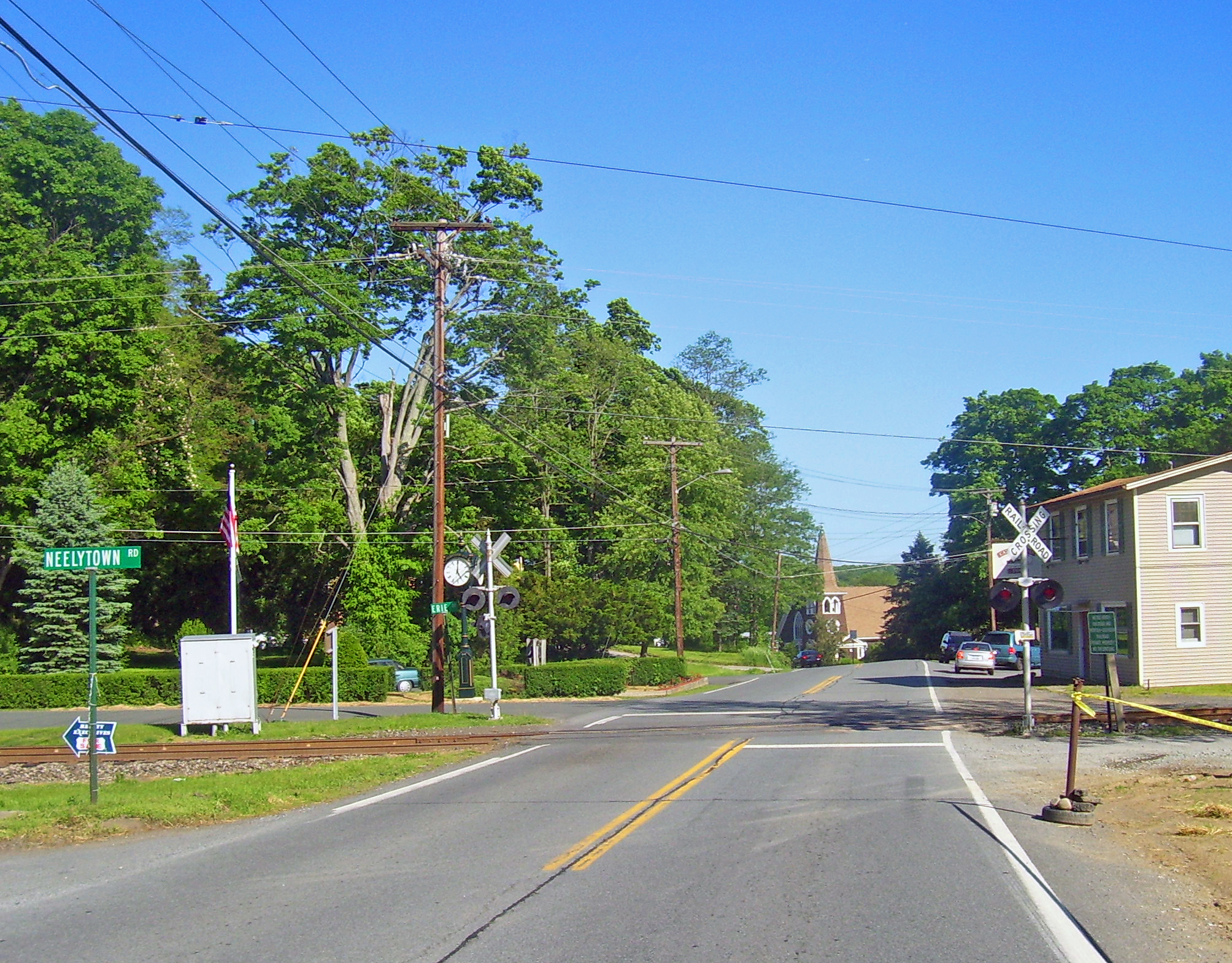
NY 207 crossing through the hamlet of Campbell Hall

NY 207 begins at the Quickway (NY 17 and US 6) and a junction with NY 17M in the village of Goshen. Also present at the intersection is NY 17A, which terminates at the same junction and whose right-of-way becomes NY 207. Entering downtown Goshen, NY 207 gains the Greenwich Avenue moniker, until reaching the junction with Church Street, where it turns onto Main Street. Once straightening to the north, the route crosses past the Harness Racing Museum & Hall of Fame and the Orange County Government Center. Near the junction with Victoria Terrace, NY 207 leaves the village of Goshen, dropping the Main Street moniker as it winds north through the town of Goshen.

A two-lane countryside roadway, NY 207 reaches the hamlet of Kipps, bending northwest at a junction with Kipp Road, then darting northeast into the town of Hamptonburgh. The route starts passing multiple farms, and the terminus of County Route 53 (CR 53 or Stony Ford Road). A short distance later, NY 207 reaches a junction with CR 77 (Egbertson Road), which connects to the Metro-North Railroad's Campbell Hall station. A short distance after, the route crosses under the Port Jervis Line and into a junction with the southern terminus of NY 416.

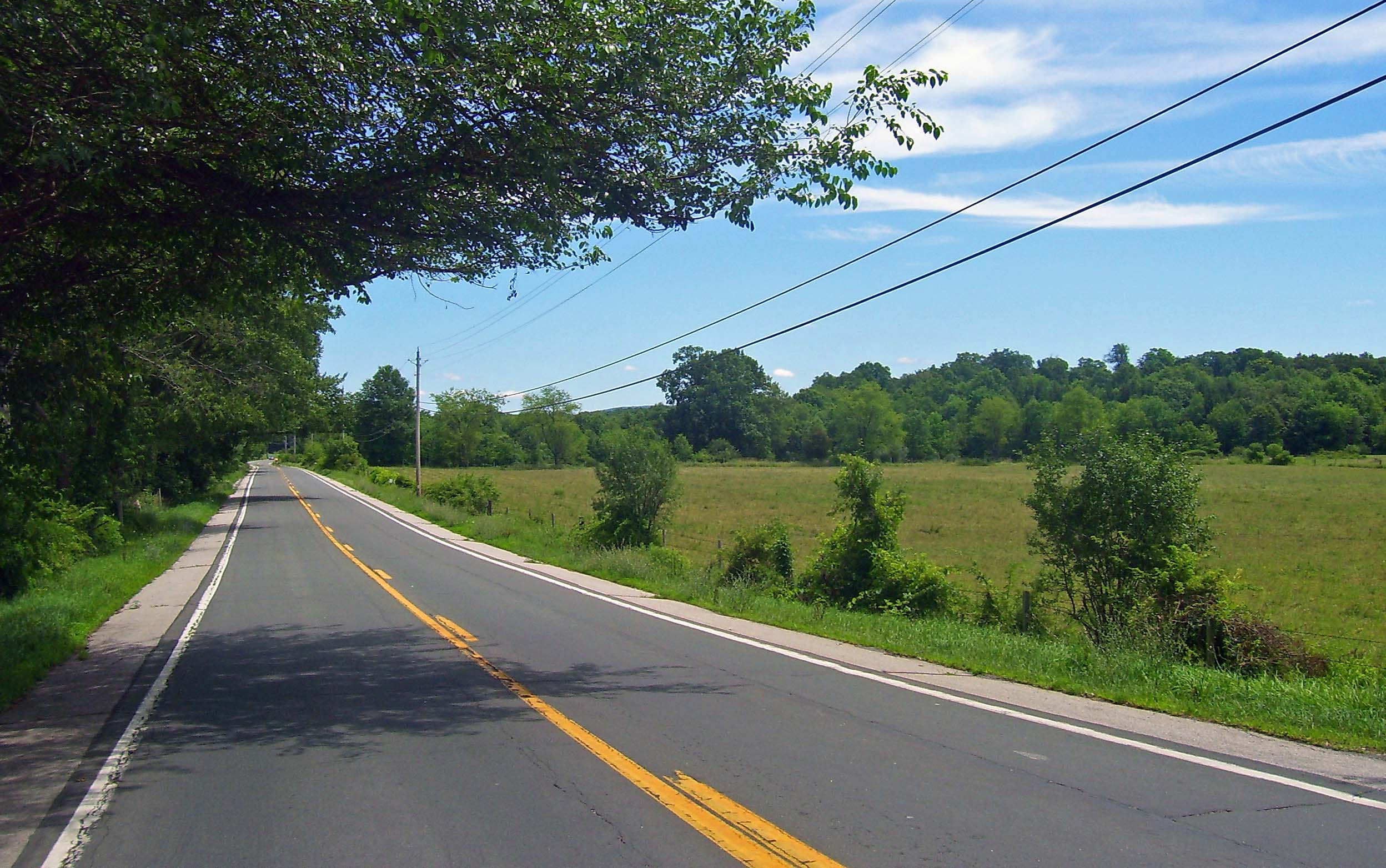
Countryside along NY 207 in the town of Hamptonburgh

At NY 416, NY 207 turns eastward through Hamptonburgh, entering the hamlet of Campbell Hall, crossing over the former Erie Railroad Montgomery Branch (now used by Norfolk Southern) and past the station site. Continuing east through Campbell Hall, the route crosses the Otter Kill and turns northeast through Hamptonburgh as a two-lane road. After making another bend to the southeast, NY 207 crosses south of the Otterkill Golf & Country Club, passing the northern terminus of CR 33 (Shea Road). A short distance east of the CR 33 junction, NY 207 reaches a junction with NY 208, forming a short concurrency through Hamptonburgh. After crossing a bridge over Smith Pond, NY 207 and NY 208 split, with NY 207 climbing a hill to the northeast.

Passing the hamlet of Burnside, NY 207 turns east and leaves the town of Hamptonburgh for the town of New Windsor. Near the junction with West Green Road, the route gains the moniker of Little Britain Road, crossing through the hamlet of Rock Tavern. Winding east through New Windsor, the route eventually reaches the hamlet of Little Britain, which marks the southern terminus of NY 747 (Drury Lane). Continuing past the southern ends of the grounds for Stewart International Airport, NY 207 continues through the town of New Windsor past multiple roads that cross through the airport. A short distance to the east, the route crosses under the New York State Thruway (I-87) and into a junction with NY 300 (Union Avenue). Orange County GIS Map of 2011

NY 207 and NY 300 become concurrent along Little Britain Road, reaching a large junction with Temple Hill Road, where NY 300 turns southeast, while NY 207 continues northeast along Little Britain. Immediately after the junction, NY 207 crosses Lake Washington and bypasses the hamlet of New Windsor to the north. The two-lane road winds northeast through New Windsor, soon leaving for the town of Newburgh. Still known as Little Britain Road, NY 207 crosses northeast through Newburgh, reaching a junction with Wisner Avenue. At this junction, the route used to turn north onto Wisner, going two blocks north to a junction with NY 17K. Today the route bypasses Wisner Avenue and continues along Little Britain Road, passing through an intersection with Washington Terrace before it reaches NY 17K.

== History ==
NY 207 was assigned to its current alignment as part of the 1930 renumbering of state highways in New York. When it was widened, the short section concurrent with NY 300 was relocated just to the south. The former right of way can still be seen. While much of the countryside surrounding NY 207 is rural and picturesque, increasing development within the county has given it the highest growth in traffic volume of any Orange County state highway in the early 2000s, according to New York State Department of Transportation data analyzed by the Times Herald-Record.

== Major intersections ==
The entire route is in Orange County.

Location	mi	km	Destinations	Notes
Village of Goshen	0.00	0.00	NY 17A east – Florida	Continuation east
Village of Goshen	0.00	0.00	Future I-86 / US 6 / NY 17 / NY 17M – Chester	Exit 124 on NY 17
Hamptonburgh	5.48	8.82	NY 416 north – Montgomery	Southern terminus of NY 416; hamlet of Campbell Hall
Hamptonburgh	9.11	14.66	NY 208 south – Washingtonville	Western end of NY 208 concurrency; hamlet of Burnside
Hamptonburgh	9.24	14.87	NY 208 north – Maybrook	Eastern end of NY 208 concurrency; hamlet of Burnside
New Windsor	13.78	22.18	NY 747 north to I-84 – Stewart Airport	Southern terminus of NY 747; former CR 54; hamlet of Little Britain
New Windsor	16.57	26.67	NY 300 north (Union Avenue) to I-87 / New York Thruway / I-84 – Wallkill	Western end of NY 300 concurrency
New Windsor	16.96	27.29	NY 300 south – Vails Gate	Eastern end of NY 300 concurrency
Newburgh	19.10	30.74	NY 17K (Broadway)	Eastern terminus
1.000 mi = 1.609 km; 1.000 km = 0.621 mi: Concurrency terminus
