= African-American Cemetery (Montgomery, New York) =

Historic cemetery in New York, United States

- U.S. National Register of Historic Places
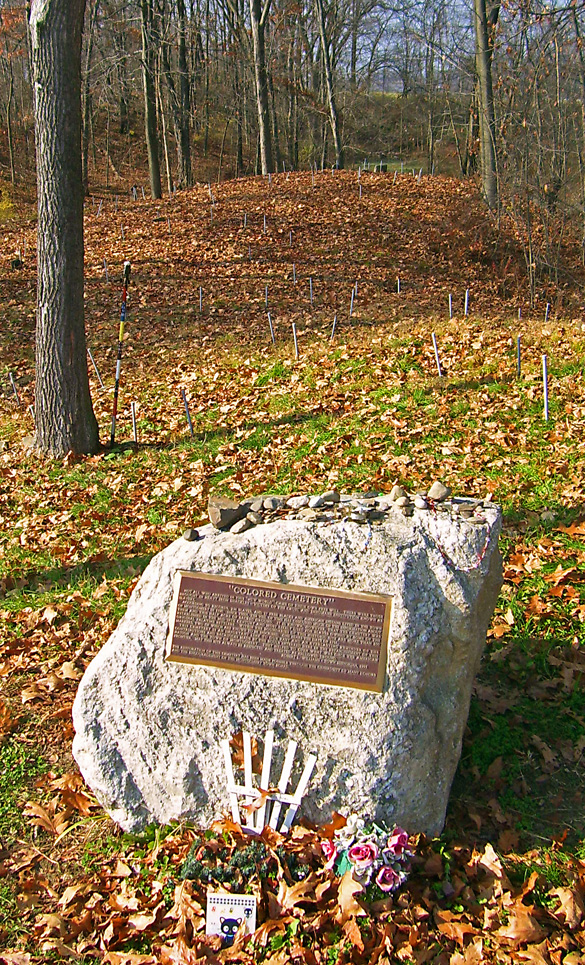
- Pipes indicate the gravesites in the cemetery
- Location: NY 416, Town of Montgomery, NY
- Nearest city: Middletown
- Coordinates: 41°30′16″N 74°15′16″W
- Area: less than one acre
- Built: 1750
- NRHP reference No.: 96000862
- Added to NRHP: August 16, 1996

The African-American Cemetery, known historically as the Colored Cemetery, in the town of Montgomery, New York, United States, holds the graves of roughly 100 humans. It is located on NY 416 one-tenth of a mile (160 m) north of the Interstate 84 crossing, near the Wallkill River.

All the originally marked graves that have been identified have had the stones used to mark them supplemented with small pipes. Only two have any kind of discernible inscription, one of which dates its occupant's passing to 1756.

The site had grown neglected until the town and private donors undertook to fix it up in the early 1990s. It was fully restored and rededicated, with a new wooden fence and explanatory plaque, in 1995.

It was added to the National Register of Historic Places in 1996.
