= Bridge Street Historic District (Montgomery, New York) =

Historic district in New York, United States

- U.S. National Register of Historic Places
- U.S. Historic district
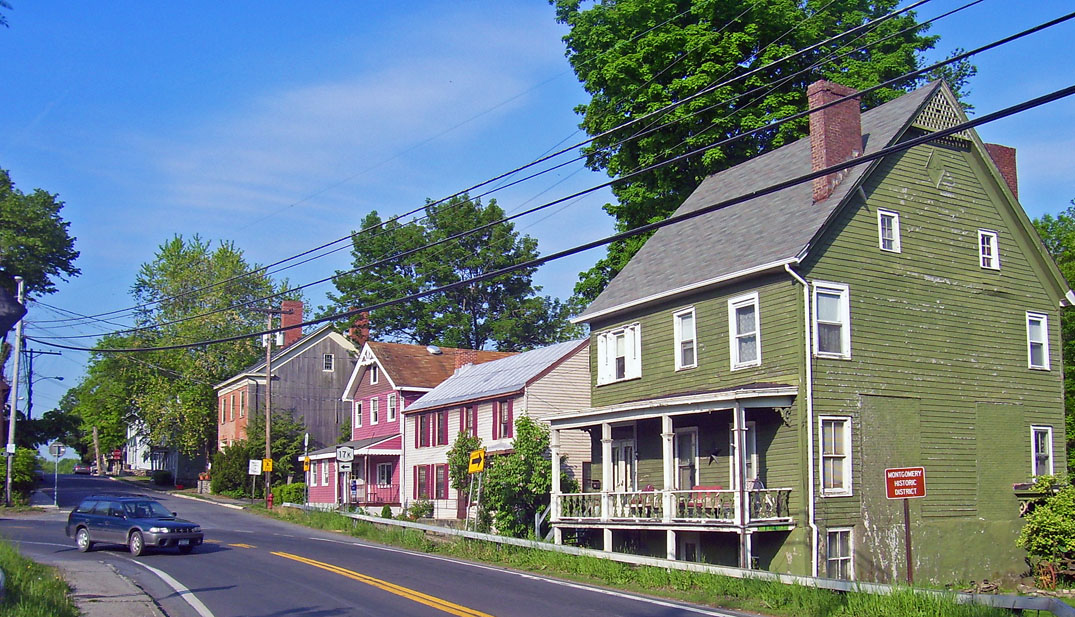
- Looking south on Bridge Street from Route 17K.

- Location within New York Location within the United States
- Location: Montgomery, NY
- Nearest city: Newburgh
- Coordinates: 41°31′38″N 74°14′25″W
- Area: 130 acres (53 ha)
- Built: Late 18th-early 19th century
- Architectural style: Greek Revival, Federal
- NRHP reference No.: 80002736
- Added to NRHP: 1980

The Bridge Street historic district is the smaller of two that make up the downtown area of the village of Montgomery in Orange County, New York. It is located along Bridge Street, just off NY 17K as it enters the village by crossing the Wallkill River at Ward's Bridge, hence its name. The Union Street-Academy Hill Historic District is located immediately to the southeast.

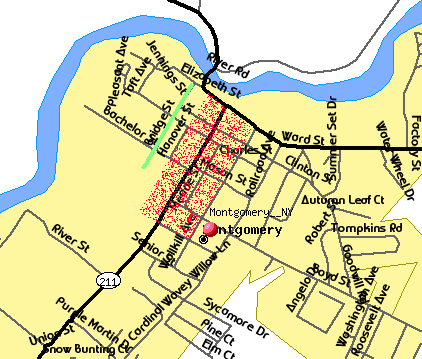
Bridge Street highlighted in green (red area is the adjoining Union Street-Academy Hill Historic District)

The district is primarily residential. Its 28 houses are generally older than their counterparts in the larger district, with the oldest dating to 1792. It was added to the National Register of Historic Places in 1980.
