= New York State Route 416 =

State highway in Orange County, New York, US

New York State Route 416
- Map of Orange County in southeastern New York with NY 416 highlighted in red

Route information
- Maintained by NYSDOT
- Length: 4.24 mi (6.82 km)
- Existed: 1930–present

Major junctions
- South end: NY 207 in Hamptonburgh
- North end: NY 211 in Montgomery

Location
- Country: United States
- State: New York
- Counties: Orange

Highway system
- New York Highways; Interstate; US; State; Reference; Parkways
| ← NY 415 | → NY 417 |

New York State Route 416 (NY 416) is a state highway located entirely within the towns of Hamptonburgh and Montgomery in Orange County, New York, in the United States. It extends for 4.24 miles (6.82 km) in a north–south direction from an intersection with NY 207 in Hamptonburgh to a junction with NY 211 in Montgomery. It does not intersect any other state routes besides those at its termini, nor pass through any settlements. NY 416 is a two-lane highway for its entire length, and mainly serves to allow traffic from the northwestern corner of the county to get to Goshen, the county seat, more easily. Despite its minimal length, the route passes a number of places of interest and is a quite scenic country road. The route was assigned as part of the 1930 renumbering of state highways in New York.

== Route description ==
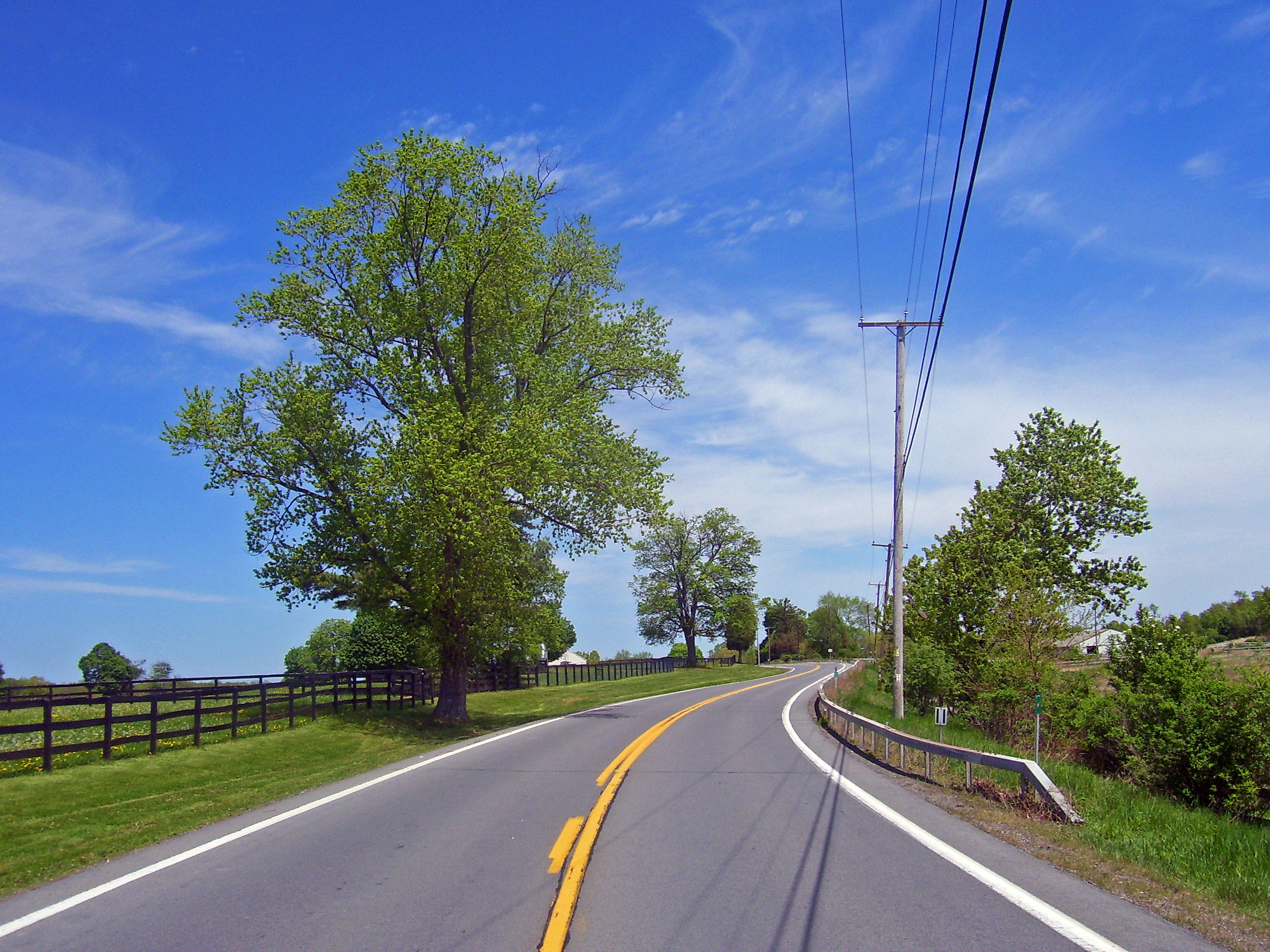
NY 416 passing horse farms after Thomas Bull Park

NY 416 begins at an intersection with NY 207 in Hamptonburgh just north of a tunnel carrying NY 207 under railroad tracks shared by the Metro North and Norfolk Southern railroads. From its south end, the route heads uphill across open, rolling fields, passing the former headquarters of Local Media Group, once publishers of the local daily, the Times Herald-Record. A bit further on, it passes the Hill–Hold historic site on the east and provides the main access to Thomas Bull Memorial Park, one of the county's most popular. After the park, the road begins a descent to the lowlands around the Wallkill River, a stretch surrounded by several horse farms.

It draws alongside the Wallkill as it approaches a cluster of shipping warehouses along the south side of Interstate 84 (I-84). The river and the highway pass under the freeway with no connection, and NY 416 continues alongside the river while meandering past some more farmland as it enters the town of Montgomery. The river makes a turn to the west across the town line; however, NY 416 stays on a generally northward track to a restored slave cemetery situated on the west side of the highway. Another short stretch of fields brings NY 416 to its northern terminus at a junction with NY 211 just south of the Montgomery village line. This intersection is right next to Orange County Airport and two other historic sites. The Harrison Meeting House Site and Cemetery is on the east side of the road, and the Johannes Miller House lies across from it on the opposite side of NY 211.

== History ==
The origins of NY 416 date back to 1902 when the state of New York awarded a contract on June 20 to improve 8 miles (13 km) of roads in Goshen and Hamptonburgh to state highway standards. The stretch cost $35,712 to reconstruct (equivalent to $1,279,680 in 2025) and was added to the state highway system on August 5, 1904, as unsigned State Highway 65 (SH 65). SH 65 did not receive a posted route number until the 1930 renumbering of state highways in New York, when hundreds of state-maintained highways were given signed designations for the first time. The southern half of SH 65 became part of NY 207 while the northern part was designated as NY 416. Originally, NY 416 followed then-NY 84 northeast into Montgomery, where both routes terminated at NY 17K. In the mid-1960s, the NY 84 designation was eliminated to avoid confusion with the new I-84, and its former alignment east of Middletown became an extension of NY 211. NY 416 was truncated to its current length by 1970.

In 2021 two traffic lights were erected to manage increased truck traffic to the newly built Medline warehouse on NY 416 north of I-84. One is just south of the interstate at the junction with CR 99; the other is at the entrance to the warehouse complex just north of the interstate.

== Major intersections ==
The entire route is in Orange County.

| Location | mi | km | Destinations | Notes |
|---|---|---|---|---|
| Hamptonburgh | 0.00 | 0.00 | NY 207 – Newburgh, Goshen | Hamlet of Campbell Hall; southern terminus |
| Village of Montgomery | 4.24 | 6.82 | NY 211 – Middletown, Montgomery | Northern terminus, access to Orange County Airport |
1.000 mi = 1.609 km; 1.000 km = 0.621 mi
