= Montgomery Worsted Mills =

- U.S. National Register of Historic Places
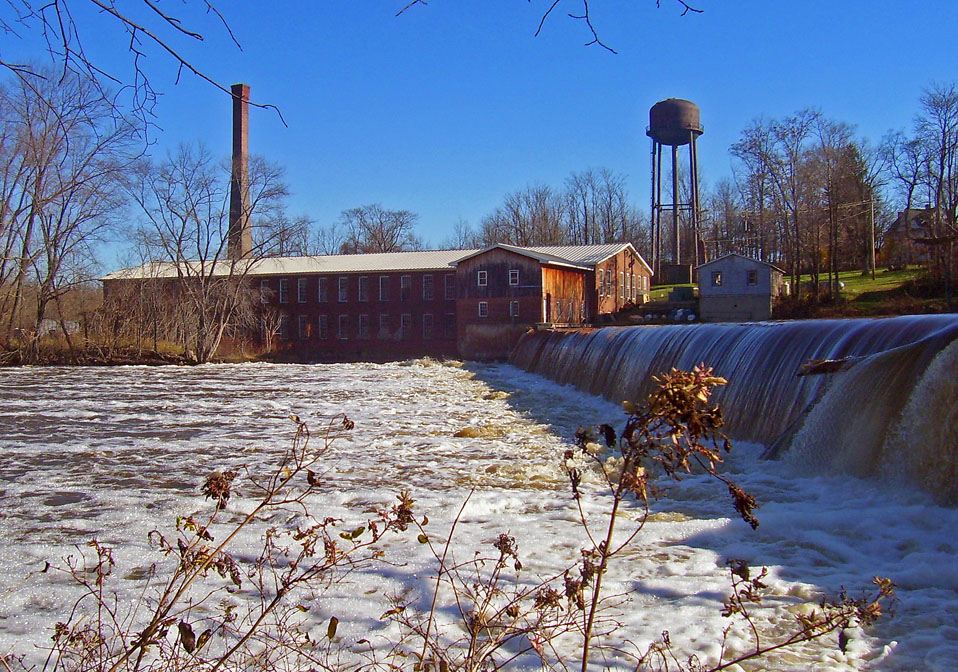
- The mills and its dam from across the Wallkill River
- Location: 23 Factory Street, Montgomery, New York
- Nearest city: Newburgh
- Coordinates: 41°31′50″N 74°13′36″W
- Built: 1813, rebuilt 1892
- NRHP reference No.: 80002738
- Added to NRHP: November 21, 1980

The Montgomery Worsted Mills, known today as Montgomery Mills, is along the Wallkill River at the end of Factory Street in the Orange County village of Montgomery, New York. It was one of the earliest efforts to harness the river for industrial purposes.

Founders Arthur Patchett and William Crabtree became prosperous and upstanding citizens who left their mark on the community they lived in. Many of the homes on the nearby stretch of Factory Street were built by them for their family, and their descendants still live in the Montgomery area. The mills are no longer property of the family or used to mill textiles. While they sold yarn, the mill was in its later years primarily an electric power generation station. It is now a City Winery location.

== Site ==
The mills today consist of a main brick building, running north–south along the river. An east-west wing built partly over the adjacent dam and its flume is three stories high and houses the Hydroelectric turbines. Another east-west wing holds the main office and store. A second brick building slightly uphill is today leased out to an architectural moldings business. One barn, the second one built, is slightly downriver in some adjacent woods.

Factory Street becomes a gravel loop at the mill. Historically there were two large tenements for mill employees at the uphill edge of the property, but they were demolished several decades ago.

== History ==
The river had been dammed at the mill location since at least the 18th century, and a grist mill had long existed opposite the mill site on the west bank of the river when Johannes Miller began seeking investors for what was to be at first a cotton mill in 1813. It would be one of the earliest attempts to harness the Wallkill for industry. At that time wool came straight from locally farmed sheep and was completely processed at the mill.

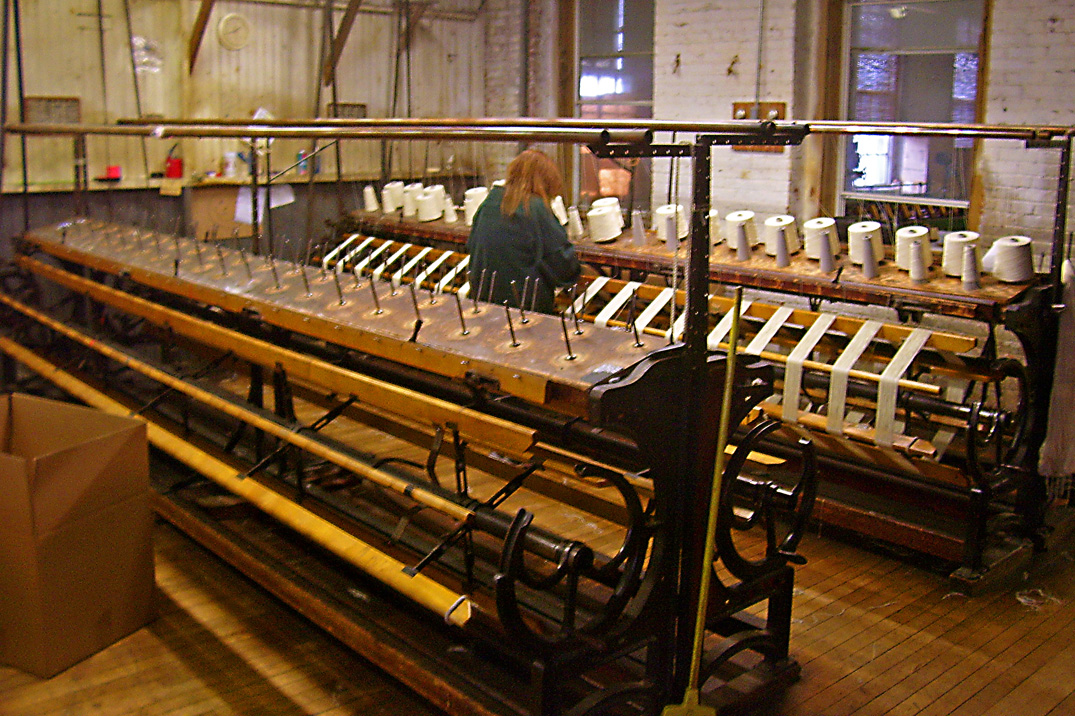
Spinning room at the mill in early 21st century

The cotton mill failed before it could even begin production and nothing happened with the site until about 1870, when an English immigrant, Edmund Ackroyd, bought the property and added a three-story addition. Ten years later, William Crabtree and Arthur Patchett bought the mills, focusing its process on spinning at the expense of weaving. In 1897, they had to establish a branch mill on South Colden Street in Newburgh due to labor shortages in Montgomery.

On Election Day, November 3, 1891, the factory was burned completely to the ground and the current, 50,000-square-foot (4,600 m^{2}) structure built in its place. It would be in operation by the next summer. Another fire would destroy the Newburgh branch on May 23, 1900.

Patchett died in late 1901, and Crabtree took on his five sons as replacement partners the following year., then died himself on a return trip to England the year after that. The sons all built houses, some of which stand, on the hillside above the mill. They would later be used to house employees.

In 1906 they expanded the mill further, extending the south wing to add drawing and spinning space. The office that had been there was moved to a new north wing, which also housed sorting, scouring and carding rooms. Eight years later, the dam was rebuilt so it crossed the river in a straight line rather than at an angle. After World War I, the mill would see serious expansion. Sometime before the mid-1920s, the Wallkill Valley Railroad added a route that crossed (and still does) Factory Street near the mill, greatly shortening the distance required to put finished yarns on trains. Automobiles, too, began replacing the horse-drawn carts that had been carrying the finished product.

A new packing and sorting wing was built in 1922 and a new factory acquired on South William Street in Newburgh. However, these investments could not help the partnership survive the Great Depression, and the mills would be sold to the Steinberger family of New York. It has remained in their hands, and in business in some way, ever since.

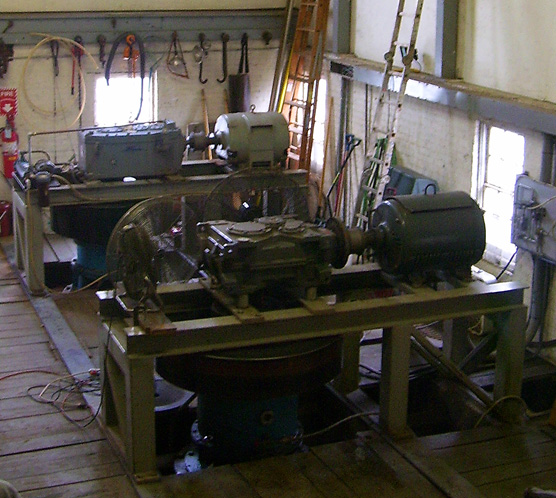
The hydroelectric turbines

In the late 1940s, the former houses that had been home to the workers were torn down as the expense was no longer justified. The Steinbergers gradually switched over to power generation, selling what is today 250 kilowatts of hydroelectric power to CH Energy Group. They also lease out some of the available space and offer shipping services as well. A retail store in the mill is open to the public daily from 9 a.m. to 4 p.m., selling yarns spun for knitting and weaving.

The Steinbergers reached an agreement to sell the mill to Michael Dorf in 2018. He converted it into a location for his City Winery chain. It is the only location where wine would be produced on site, capable of producing 30–40,000 cases a year, using power generated by the river and solar cells to be placed on the roof.

== See also ==
- National Register of Historic Places in Orange County, New York
