= Hamptonburgh, New York =

- Town
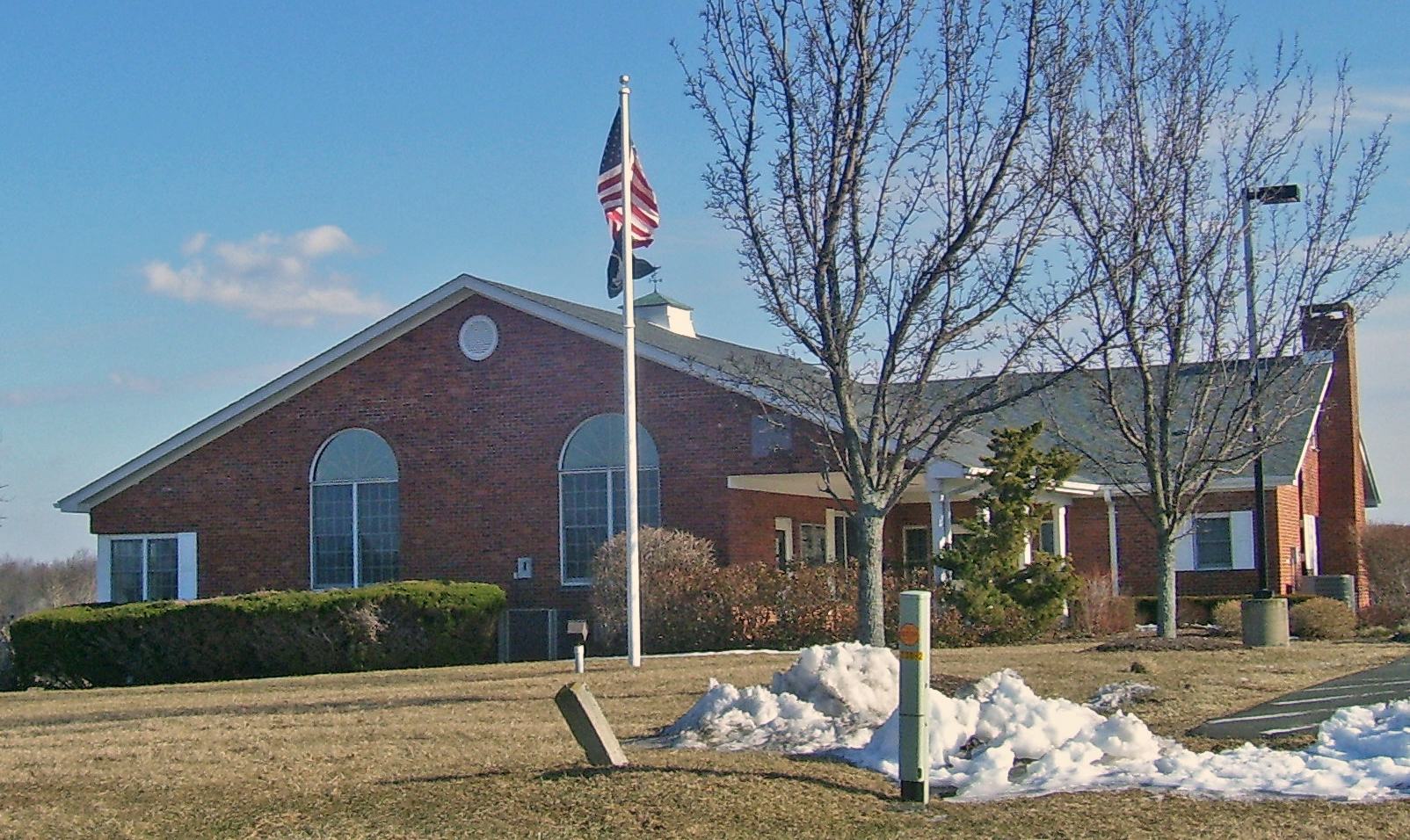
- Town hall

- Location of Hamptonburgh in Orange County and the state of New York

- Location within the state of New York
- Coordinates: 41°27′15″N 74°14′48″W
- Country: United States
- State: New York
- County: Orange

Government
  - Type: Town Council
  - Town Supervisor: Robert S. Jankowski (R)
  - Town Council: Members' List: • James M. Lord (R); • Richard M. Cocchiara (R); • Marcus A. Horrego (R); • Gregory Willems (R)

Area
  - Total: 26.97 sq mi (69.85 km^{2})
  - Land: 26.76 sq mi (69.30 km^{2})
  - Water: 0.21 sq mi (0.55 km^{2})
- Elevation: 384 ft (117 m)

Population (2020)
  - Total: 5,489
- Time zone: UTC-5 (Eastern (EST))
  - Summer (DST): UTC-4 (EDT)
- FIPS code: 36-31907
- GNIS feature ID: 0979042
- Website: townhamptonburgh.digitaltowpath.org:10051/content

Hamptonburgh is a town located in the north central part of Orange County, New York, United States. The population was 5,489 at the 2020 census. The municipal offices are at the hamlet of Campbell Hall.

== History ==
The town was part of the patent of 1703, assigned to Christopher Denn and others. Hamptonburgh was named by an early settler, William Bull, for his place of birth, Wolverhampton, England. Bull married Sarah Wells. Bull was a stone mason and built many stone houses in area. He built what is now known as General Henry Knox's Headquarters, used as a headquarters in the American Revolution. William and Sarah married in 1718 and built the Bull Stone House on 100 acres, now at the intersection of the Sarah Wells Trail and County Route 51. They raised 12 children to adulthood, who all married and raised children to adulthood. Today, the Bull Family still owns and occupies the Bull Stone House, hold America's second longest annual family reunion, and have maintained their genealogy since 1796. In his lifetime, Bull amassed thousands of acres around his original 100. He left much of it to his five sons, who handed much of it down to their children. William Bull and Sarah Wells are buried in the Hamptonburgh Cemetery. William died in the winter of 1755/56. Sarah died at the age of 100 years and 15 days in 1796.

The town was established in 1830 from parts of the Towns of Blooming Grove, Goshen, and Montgomery, including land which previously belonged to Loyalist Fletcher Mathews (brother of David Mathews who was Mayor of New York City) during its occupation by the British during the American Revolution).

=== Campbell Hall ===
==== Early years ====
According to An Outline History of Orange County by Samuel Watkins Eager p. 378, the hamlet of Campbell Hall was named for Colonel Campbell who was a Scotchman, had two sons, and when the war of the Revolution commenced, one son sided with England, the other with his adopted country. The Tory brother would not speak with his Republican relative. The sentiments of this brother were changed by the happy results of the revolution.

==== Railroads ====
From 1900 to about 1960, Campbell Hall was a center of considerable railroad activity. The Erie, New York Ontario and Western, Lehigh and New England, New York Susquehanna and Western, came together and interchanged freight at the nearby large Maybrook railroad yard. NYO&W, financially struggling from inception, abandoned operations in 1957. Freight business for the other railroads diminished too, causing a considerable loss of railroad employment for Hamptonburgh.

== Geography ==
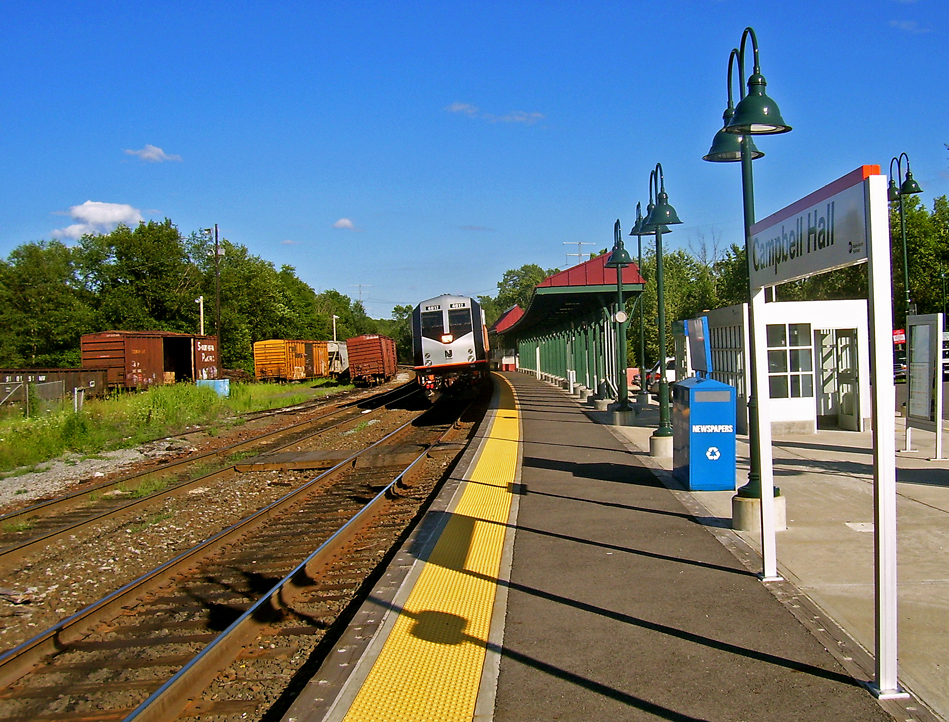
Campbell Hall station, part of Metro-North Railroad's Port Jervis Line

According to the United States Census Bureau, the town has a total area of 27.0 square miles (70 km^{2}), of which 26.8 square miles (69 km^{2}) is land and 0.2 square miles (0.52 km^{2}) (0.67%) is water. It includes the Thomas Bull Memorial County Park.

NY 207 and NY 416 intersect west of Campbell Hall.

== Demographics ==
Historical population
Census	Pop.	Note	%±
1830	1,365		—
1840	1,379		1.0%
1850	1,343		−2.6%
1860	1,295		−3.6%
1870	1,224		−5.5%
1880	1,143		−6.6%
1890	1,129		−1.2%
1900	1,072		−5.0%
1910	1,168		9.0%
1920	1,104		−5.5%
1930	1,130		2.4%
1940	1,086		−3.9%
1950	1,272		17.1%
1960	1,695		33.3%
1970	2,204		30.0%
1980	2,945		33.6%
1990	3,910		32.8%
2000	4,686		19.8%
2010	5,561		18.7%
2020	5,489		−1.3%
U.S. Decennial Census

According to the Census Bureau's 2020 Census, there were 5,489 people, and 1,642 households residing in the town. The population density was 205.1 inhabitants per square mile (79.2/km^{2}). There were 1,532 housing units at an average density of 57.2 per square mile (22.1/km^{2}). The racial makeup of the town was 92.3% White, 3.9% African American, 0.0% Native American, 2.6% Asian, and 1.1% from two or more races. Hispanic or Latino of any race were 6.5% of the population.

There were 1,338 family households, out of which 36.3% had children under the age of 18 living with them, 76.2% were married couples living together, 5.1% had a female householder with no husband present, 3.8% had a male householder with no wife present, and 14.9% were non-families. 12.9% of all households were made up of individuals, and 4.2% had someone living alone who was 65 years of age or older. The average household size was 3.43 and the average family size was 3.78.

In the town, the population was spread out, with 2.5% under the age of 5, 22.1% under the age of 18, and 15.2% who were 65 years of age or older. 48.8% of the population is female, and 51.2% male.

The Census Bureau's 2020 Census showed that (in 2020 inflation-adjusted dollars) median household income was $104,375. The per capita income for the village was $41,399. About 6.9% of the population were below the poverty line.

== Economy ==
Hamptonburgh is a wider area, but the main center of Hamptonburgh is Campbell Hall. Campbell Hall is home to America's first butter factory. It is also the location of the Otterkill Fire Department and the Campbell Hall post office. Its economy is derived from a number of sources: The General Store, Campbell Hall Salvage, American Fence, a Service Station, the Bull's Head Inn, and a number of horse and dairy farms. Campbell Hall also is home to Orange AHRC, the Otterkill Golf and Country Club, and a Metro-North train station.

== Communities and locations in Hamptonburgh ==
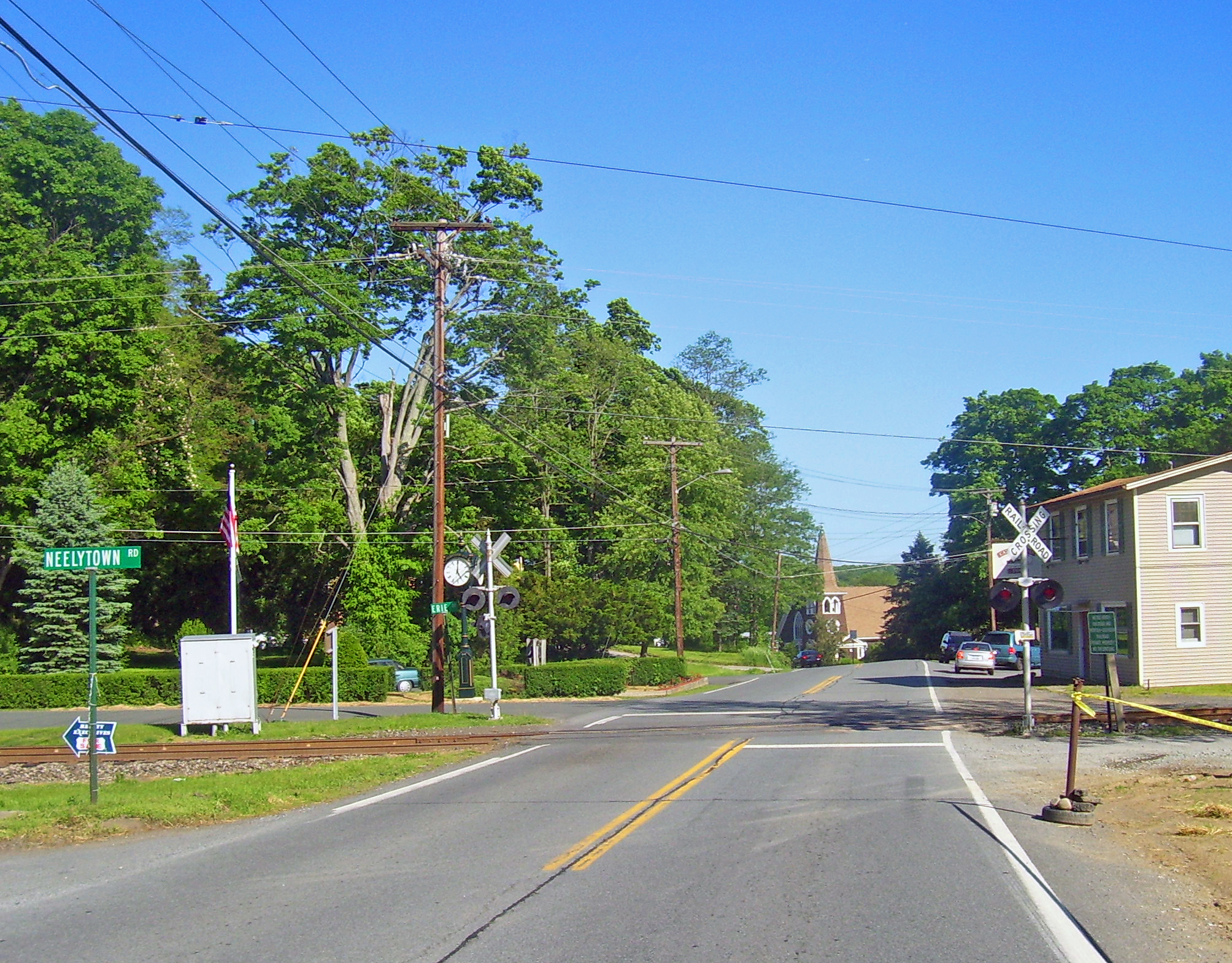
The hamlet of Campbell Hall

- Burnside – Formerly a hamlet with its own post office, it is now serviced by the Campbell Hall post office. It is located near the town line east of Campbell Hall.
- Campbell Hall – The hamlet of Campbell Hall is the principal community in the town and is located on New York State Route 207.
- Campbell Hall Junction – A small railroad yard and terminus of the Maybrook Railroad line in Campbell Hall that was previously a major junction of five railroads including the Central New England Railway, Lehigh and New England Railroad, New York, Ontario & Western Railway, Erie Railroad, and New York Central Railroad, albeit, the Erie used a separate station.
- Hamptonburgh – The hamlet of Hamptonburgh is located south of Campbell Hall at the intersection of County Roads 8 and 51.
- Kipps – A location near the southern town line.
- LaGrange – A location southwest of Campbell Hall on NY 207.
- Neelytown – A location near the northern town line.
- Stony Ford – A location near the western town line.

== Notable people ==
- Ames T. Brown – Adjutant General of New York, lived in Campbell Hall
