= Orange County Airport (New York) =

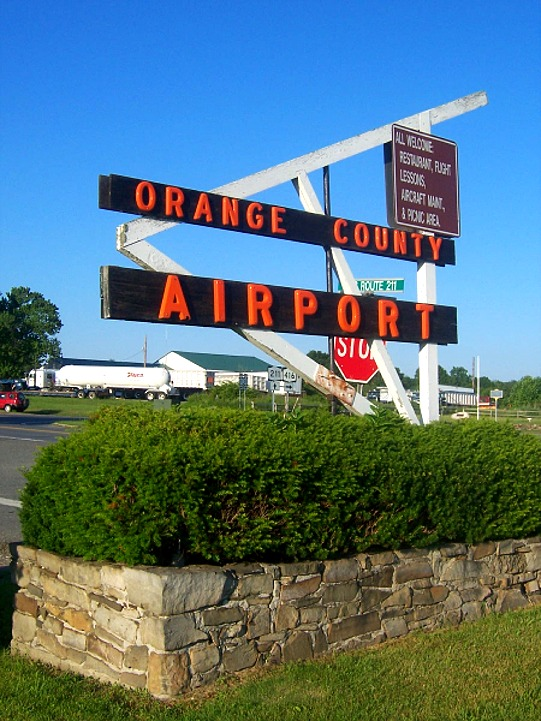
- IATA: MGJ; ICAO: KMGJ; FAA LID: MGJ

Summary
- Airport type: Public
- Owner: Orange County, New York
- Location: Montgomery, New York
- Elevation AMSL: 364 ft (111 m)
- Coordinates: 41°30′36″N 074°15′53″W
- Website: https://www.orangecountygov.com/178/Airport-Orange-County

Map
- Location of airport in New York

Runways
Direction	Length		Surface
Direction	ft	m	Surface
4/22	5,006	1,526	Asphalt
8/26	3,664	1,117	Asphalt

Statistics (2018)
- Aircraft operations: 118,900
- Based aircraft: 167
- Source: Federal Aviation Administration

Orange County Airport (IATA: MGJ, ICAO: KMGJ, FAA LID: MGJ) is an untowered airport located one nautical mile (2 km) southwest of the village of Montgomery, in the Town of Montgomery, New York, United States, at the junction of state highways 211 and 416. It is owned and operated by Orange County. It is included in the National Plan of Integrated Airport Systems for 2011–2015, which categorized it as a general aviation facility.

It is a popular place for aspiring local pilots to learn to fly or practice their skills. With 125,000 takeoffs and landings annually, it was New York's second-busiest general-aviation airport in 2006.

Transmissions between pilots and the airport are rebroadcast on a one-watt station at 88.1 megahertz, so it is possible to tune into them on a standard car radio while driving in the vicinity.

The airport's low traffic and out-of-the-way location have made it a popular place to store private jets. In 2006 county officials were reported to be working on a deal with a local developer to build 10 private luxury hangars to cater to what they saw as a growing market and raise money for the airport without raising taxes.

== Facilities and aircraft ==
Orange County Airport covers an area of 596 acres (241 ha) at an elevation of 364 feet (111 m) above mean sea level. It has two asphalt paved runways: 4/22 is 5,006 by 100 feet (1,526 by 30 m) and 8/26 is 3,664 by 100 feet (1,117 by 30 m).

There are three corporate facilities at KMGJ. Take Flight Aviation, voted as 2018's Best Flight School in the United States by AOPA, offers flight training and aircraft management as well as aircraft acquisition and consultation. Avquest Aviation Services also offers flight training and aircraft management in addition to aircraft maintenance and sales. Taylor Aviation, Inc. offers charter services, aircraft sales and brokerage, maintenance and storage as well as management and consulting. Mid Hudson Aviation, LLC offers aircraft maintenance as well as management and consulting.

For the 12-month period ending August 5, 2010, the airport had 120,000 aircraft operations, an average of 328 per day: 97% general aviation, 2% air taxi, and 1% military. At that time there were 140 aircraft based at this airport: 88% single-engine, 9% multi-engine, and 3% jet.

In 2017 it was reported that the airport had had 100,000 takeoffs and landings the year before, 80% of which had been recreational with the remainder business-related. The airport currently has 130 hangars and has a total of 166 based aircraft. Two pilots keep Czech-made fighter jets at the airport.

In January 2019, a runway realignment project was completed. The project had first been conceived more than 20 years earlier but construction did not get underway until 2014. Ninety percent of the funding for the $30 million project was provided by the federal government.

== History ==
The airport was built as an Army training field in 1942. It was turned over to the county 20 years later.

The airport was also the site of SCCA National Sports Car Championship races in the late 1950s. The 1956 race was won by the legendary Carroll Shelby.

On July 17, 1960, NASCAR came to the airport with the Empire State 200, on a 2-mile (3.2 km) course. Rex White held off Richard Petty for the win, in front of 6,000 fans, winning $2,900. The mediocre attendance killed any chance of making the race an annual event, as was planned. It remains the only NASCAR event ever held in the Hudson Valley.

In 2016 the airport began a three-year project to move one of the runways 1,000 feet (300 m) to the north and change its angle by 8 degrees in order to provide a buffer zone at the ends required by the FAA for emergency landings (previously, the runway had ended at the Wallkill River). along with a new taxiway adjacent to it. The project is mostly being paid for by the FAA; the state and county have contributed 10% of the $33 million cost. Since a pond had to be filled in for the project, it was necessary under state law to create a replacement wetland, which cost $1 million.

== See also ==
- List of airports in New York
