= New York State Route 211 =

State highway in Orange County, New York, US

New York State Route 211
- Map of Orange County in southeastern New York with NY 211 highlighted in red

Route information
- Maintained by NYSDOT and the city of Middletown
- Length: 23.01 mi (37.03 km)
- Existed: 1930–present

Major junctions
- West end: US 209 in Deerpark
- NY 17M in Middletown; Future I-86 / NY 17 in Middletown; NY 416 in Montgomery
- East end: NY 17K in Montgomery

Location
- Country: United States
- State: New York
- Counties: Orange

Highway system
- New York Highways; Interstate; US; State; Reference; Parkways
| ← NY 210 | → NY 212 |

New York State Route 211 (NY 211) is a state highway located entirely within Orange County, New York, in the United States. The western terminus is at the intersection with US 209 located in Cuddebackville, and the eastern terminus is located at Montgomery at NY 17K, where it becomes the main thoroughfare.

Through Middletown, it briefly becomes a divided highway with a maximum of five lanes in each direction (a total of ten lanes). It was also through Middletown that the famed "Miracle Mile" was born, which was the beginning of the shopping center frenzy that saw many businesses move from downtown areas of Middletown to the Route 211 Shopping Corridor.

Only in Middletown does the first sign along NY 211 with a directional banner appear, when headed eastward. At that point, the road is running more to the northwest.

== Route description ==
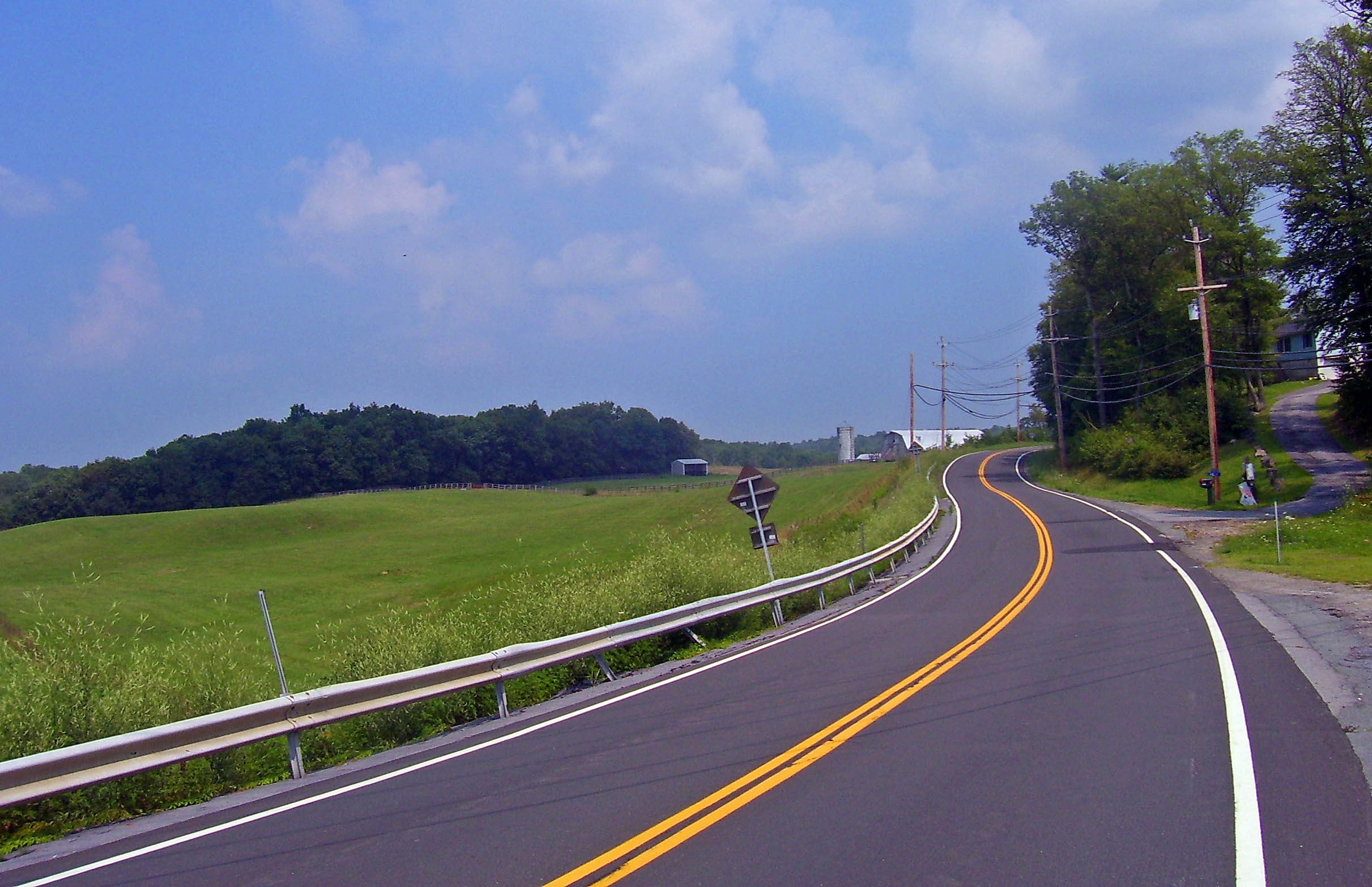
NY 211 between the village of Otisville and city of Middletown

NY 211 begins at an intersection with US 209 in the hamlet of Cuddebackville in front of the Rural Valley Cemetery. It proceeds east through Cuddebackville as a two-lane residential roadway, crossing back into the town of Deerpark and crossing over the Basher Kill, where it turns northeast along the creek. The route makes a bend towards the east and crosses over the Metro-North Railroad Port Jervis Line and the southern terminus of County Route 61 (CR 61) as it crosses into the town of Mount Hope. Now known as State Street, NY 211 enters the village of Otisville, bypassing the Otisville Tunnel and bypassing the western reaches of Otisville.

Continuing east along the Port Jervis Line tracks, NY 211, enters the center of the village near Highland Avenue. At the junction with Highland, it makes a bend to the north around the eastern portal of the Otisville Tunnel. Running southeast again, it turns out of Otisville and crosses under the tracks near Kelly Hill Road, which connects to the Otisville Metro-North station. Continuing southeast through the town of Mount Hope, the route parallels the railroad tracks past the Shawaganunk Kill. Near the White Bridge Road junction, NY 211 turns southeast away from the tracks and at the junction with Pierson Hill Road, and turns northeast again, soon winding eastward into Baileyville. In Baileyville, the route crosses over the Little Shawaganunk Kill and a junction with the northern terminus of CR 60 (Tally Ho Road).

After CR 60, NY 211 turns northeast out of Baileyville and reaches the hamlet of Howells as it crosses into the town of Wallkill. After a large bend to the southeast, the route junctions with CR 18 and begins running southeast along the residential strip northwest of the city of Middletown. Passing Monhagen Lake, NY 211 crosses southeast into the hamlet of Pilgrim Corners, where it junctions with CR 78 and soon enters the city of Middletown. Crossing over a railroad spur, NY 211 enters the city along Monhagen Avenue, a two-lane commercial/residential street in the northwestern section of the city.

Several blocks into the city, NY 211 reaches a junction with NY 17M (West Main Street). Paralleling the abandoned Erie Railroad main line through Middletown, NY 211 and NY 17M, now concurrent, turn east along West Main, bypassing the center of Middletown and soon changing names to Wickham Avenue when Main Street forks to the southeast. Bending northeast, NY 17M and NY 211 reach a junction with North Street, where NY 17M turns north onto North while NY 211 continues east on Wickham. NY 211 remains a two-lane commercial street through East Middletown, soon leaving the city for the town of Wallkill. Now without the Wickham Street moniker, the route expands to four lanes through Wallkill, becoming a long commercial boulevard through the town.

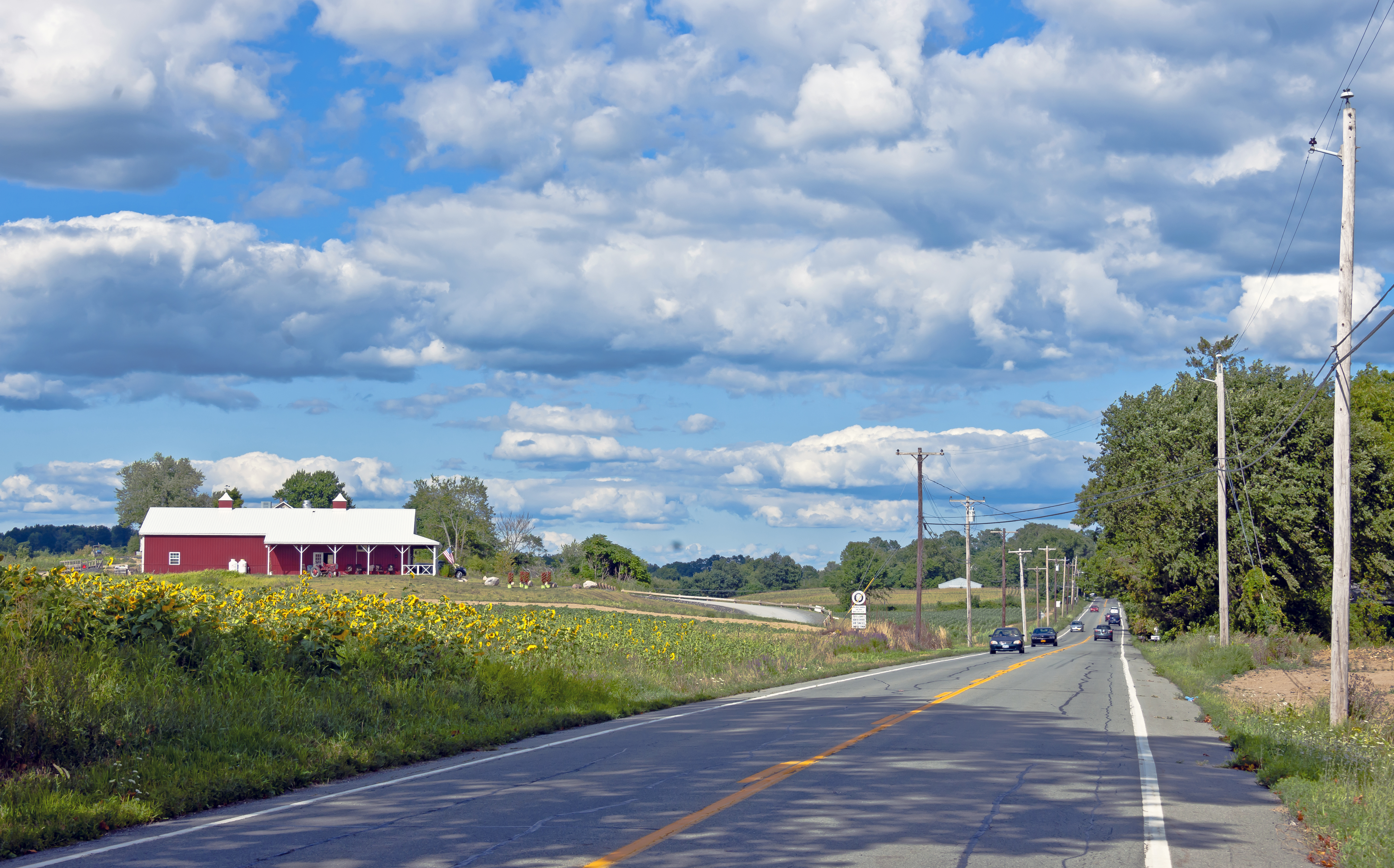
NY 211 in the Wallkill lowlands between Middletown and Montgomery

Bending eastward near Silver Lake, the route gains a center median dividing the two directions before expanding to six lanes. At the junction with the northern terminus of CR 92 (Dunning Road), NY 211 turns northeast and enters exit 120, a partial cloverleaf interchange with NY 17 (Future I-86) (the Quickway). The route then turns northeast and crosses the entrance to Galleria at Crystal Run, reaching a junction with Galleria Drive, which connects to the mall and the Middletown–Town of Wallkill Metro-North station. Reduced back to four lanes, NY 211 leaves the mall area and loses the center divide. Passing through the hamlet of Scotchtown, NY 211 crosses a junction with the southern terminus of CR 53 (Blumel Road).

Continuing east, the route reduces to two lanes through Wallkill, crossing into the hamlet of Michigan Corners, where it begins to parallel I-84 and the Port Jervis Line. Becoming a two-lane woods road through Wallkill, the route soon enters a wide flat lowlands in the area of Camp Orange Road. The route passes a back entrance to a rest area on I-84 at Bull Road, paralleling the Mannayunk Kill into the town of Montgomery. NY 211 turns northeast and crosses the Wallkill River and passes south of the runway for the Orange County Airport, which is accessible at Dunn Road. Within distance of Dunn Road, NY 211 reaches the northern terminus of NY 416. Just after NY 416, the route crosses into the village of Montgomery.

In the village, NY 211 boasts the name Union Street, crossing northwest through the commercial center of the village. Near River Street, the route bends downhill and crosses through the center of the village. As the route approaches the Wallkill River once again, it reaches a junction with NY 17K (Ward Street) at a t-intersection. This junction marks the eastern terminus of NY 211.

== History ==
The section of what is now NY 211 from Middletown to Montgomery was first laid out as part of the Minisink and Montgomery Turnpike, chartered in 1809 to build a road from Montgomery to Carpenter's Point, now near Port Jervis. West of Middletown, the road is used, though a section along the Shawangunk Mountains has since been abandoned. The section of this turnpike from North Street (now NY 17M) in Middletown to Montgomery was originally designated as part of NY 8 when the first set of posted routes in New York were assigned in 1924. NY 8 continued south from Middletown to the New Jersey state line at Unionville on modern NY 284 and east from Montgomery to Newburgh on current NY 17K. In the 1930 renumbering of state highways in New York, the portion of NY 8 southwest of Montgomery was renumbered to NY 84 while a previously unnumbered highway between Cuddebackville and NY 17 (modern NY 17M) in Middletown was designated as NY 211. The NY 84 designation was removed in May 1966 to eliminate numerical duplication with the under-construction Interstate 84. Its former routing from Middletown to Montgomery became an eastward extension of NY 211.

The westernmost portion, according to a historical marker in Cuddebackville, follows the old Mount Hope and Lumberland Turnpike, built during the War of 1812.

== Major intersections ==
The entire route is in Orange County.

| Location | mi | km | Destinations | Notes |
|---|---|---|---|---|
| Deerpark | 0.00 | 0.00 | US 209 – Port Jervis, Ellenville | Western terminus; hamlet of Cuddebackville |
| Middletown | 10.95 | 17.62 | NY 17M east (Monhagen Avenue) to US 6 – Goshen | Western end of NY 17M concurrency |
| Middletown | 11.73 | 18.88 | NY 17M west (North Street) – Washington Heights | Eastern end of NY 17M concurrency |
| Town of Wallkill | 14.01 | 22.55 | Future I-86 / NY 17 to I-84 – New York City, Binghamton, Goshen, Bloomingburg | Exit 120 on NY 17 |
| Village of Montgomery | 21.66 | 34.86 | NY 416 south – Goshen, Thomas Bull Memorial Park | Northern terminus of NY 416 |
| Village of Montgomery | 23.01 | 37.03 | NY 17K (Ward Street) – Bloomingburg, Newburgh | Eastern terminus |
1.000 mi = 1.609 km; 1.000 km = 0.621 mi: Concurrency terminus
