= Montgomery (village), New York =

Village in Orange County, New York, US

Montgomery, New York
- Village
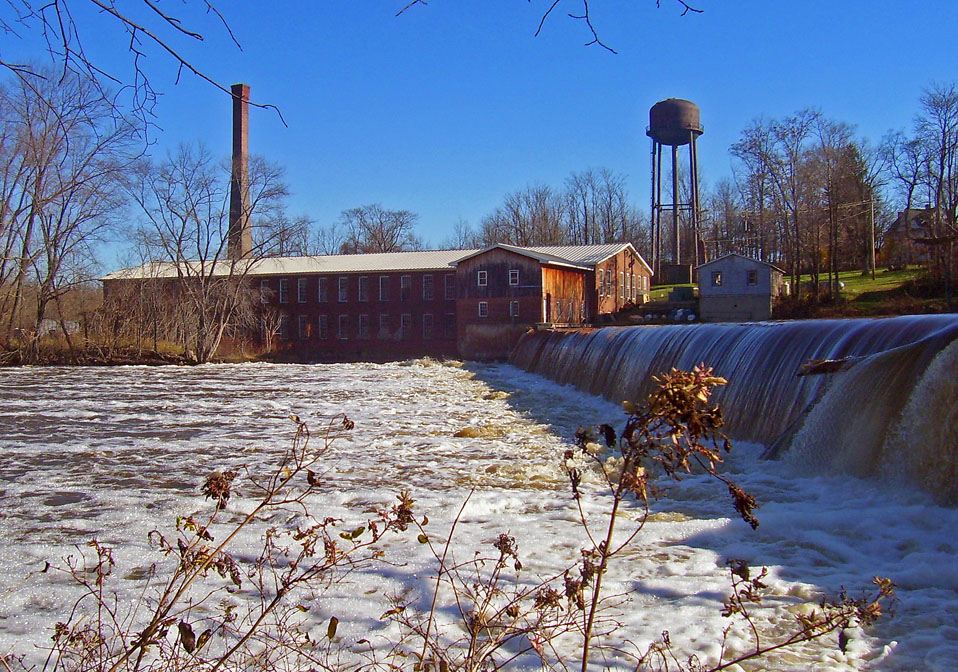
- Montgomery Worsted Mills on the Wallkill River

- Seal

- Location in Orange County and the state of New York.

- Location of New York in the United States
- Coordinates: 41°31′24″N 74°14′13″W
- Country: United States
- State: New York
- County: Orange
- Incorporated as a village: 1810; 216 years ago
- Named for: Richard Montgomery

Government
  - Mayor: Michael R. Hembury

Area
  - Total: 1.45 sq mi (3.75 km^{2})
  - Land: 1.41 sq mi (3.64 km^{2})
  - Water: 0.042 sq mi (0.11 km^{2})
- Elevation: 380 ft (120 m)
- Highest elevation (Water tower off Purple Martin Road): 455 ft (139 m)
- Lowest elevation (Along river): 340 ft (100 m)

Population (2020)
  - Total: 3,834
  - Density: 2,727.5/sq mi (1,053.11/km^{2})
- Time zone: UTC-5 (EST)
  - Summer (DST): UTC-4 (EDT)
- ZIP Code: 12549
- Area code: 845
- FIPS code: 36-48142
- GNIS feature ID: 0957558
- Website: Village of Montgomery, NY

Montgomery is a village located in Orange County, New York, United States. Located 60 miles (97 km) northwest of New York City, and 90 miles (140 km) southwest of Albany, it is an historical and cultural hub of the Hudson Valley region and has grown in the last 30 years to become an outer-ring commuter suburb within the New York metropolitan area. The population was 3,834 at the 2020 census. It is part of the Kiryas Joel–Poughkeepsie–Newburgh, NY Metropolitan Statistical Area as well as the larger New York–Newark–Bridgeport, NY-NJ-CT-PA Combined Statistical Area. The village is named after General Richard Montgomery, an officer of the American Revolution.

The Village of Montgomery is inside the Town of Montgomery.

== History ==
The original name for the village was Ward's Bridge, from James Ward, one of the first settlers, who built and operated a grist mill in what is now the village during the mid-18th century. A bridge over the Wallkill River near the mill was named after him, and even today the name and the bridge, which carries Route NY-17K into the village, remain in use.

== Geography ==
According to the United States Census Bureau, the village has a total area of 1.5 square miles (3.8 km^{2}), of which 1.4 square miles (3.6 km^{2}) is land and 0.1 square mile (0.2 km^{2}) (4.14%) is water.

Most of that water area is accounted for by the portions of the Wallkill which forms Montgomery's northern boundary; there are no other significant bodies of water in the village. The village is completely surrounded by the Town of Montgomery.

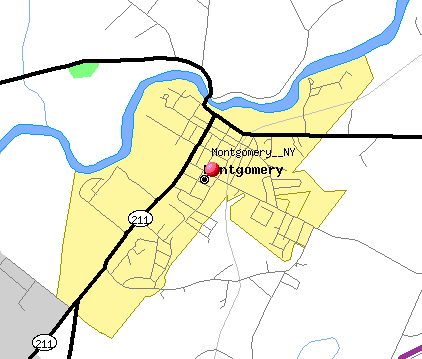
Map of Montgomery

From the river the village extends to the southwest almost two miles (3.2 km), generally longer than it is wide, with a projecting area to the southeast along Goodwill Road. The village's downtown is centered on its historical core, the area covered by the Bridge Street and Union Street-Academy Hill historic districts, just south of Ward Street (NY-17K). Clinton Street, one block south of Ward, is lined with shops and restaurants. Further to the east, some larger businesses are located near the former Wallkill Valley Railroad (WVRR) tracks, still used by Norfolk Southern as a freight spur.

Away from downtown, the streets become primarily residential, with newer housing. There are some undeveloped areas at the northern and southern extremes of the village, the latter taking the form of actively farmed fields. To the west-southwest of downtown, closer to the river, is Montgomery's major park, Veteran's Memorial Park.

These lands in the west are the lowest-lying in the village. Much of its topography rises gently from the river, with little relief save the Academy Hill area on the east edge of downtown where the village hall is located, and a 455-foot (139 m) hill at the junction of Purple Martin Road and Cardinal Drive that is the highest point in the village, marked by a water tower.

=== Transportation ===
Route 17K leads east to Newburgh and west to Bloomingburg, where it ends at NY 17, the future I-86. Its major intersection in the village, Montgomery's only traffic light, is the three-way intersection with Union Street, the northern terminus of NY-211, which connects it to Middletown to the southwest. Just south of the village, NY-416 branches off from 211, providing access to Goshen via NY-207 at its southern terminus.

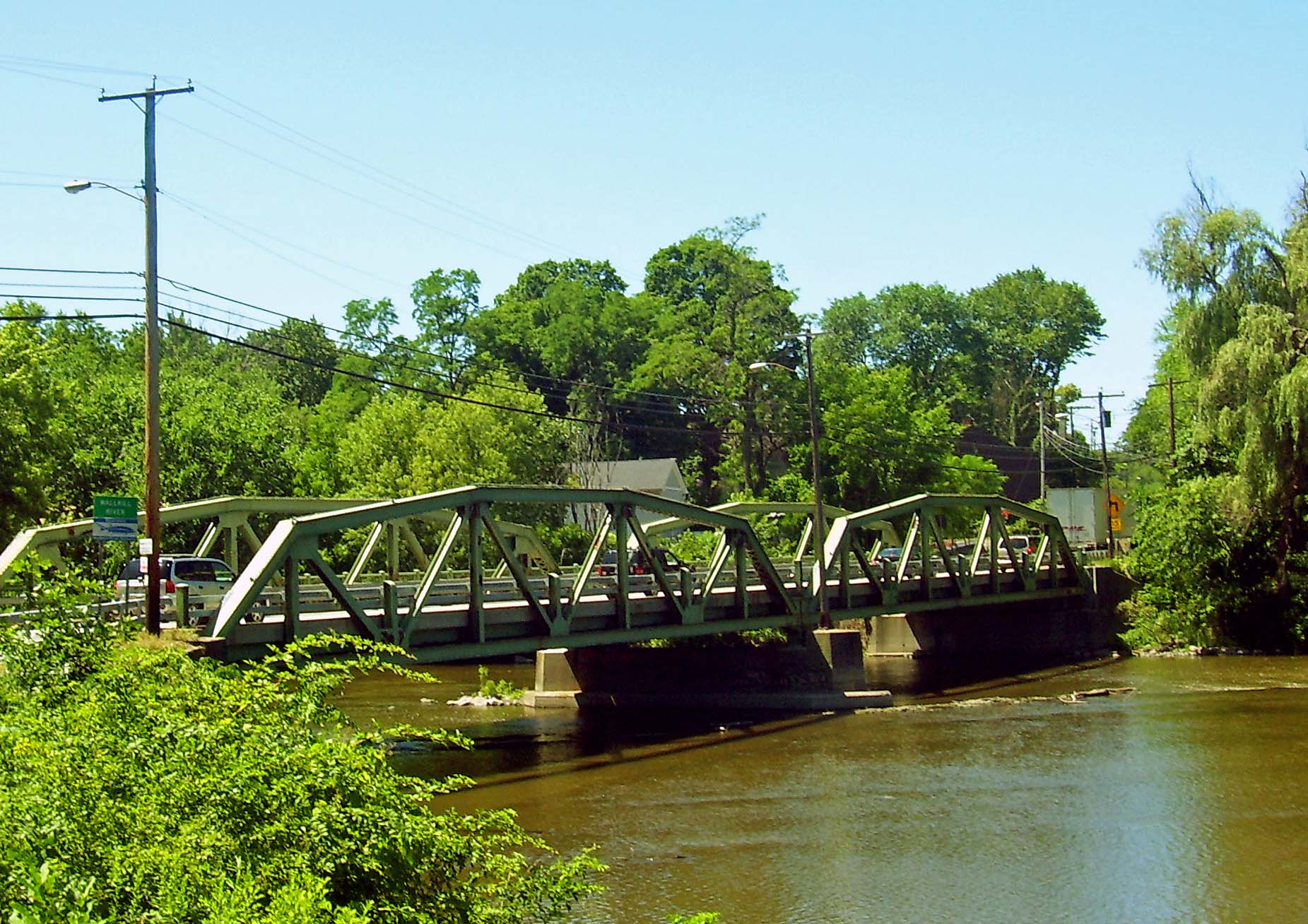
Ward's Bridge, the entrance to Montgomery from the west

Interstate 84 passes close to the southeast. The nearest access to the village is reached by taking Route 17K or Goodwill Road east to NY 208. From here it is a six-mile drive to the New York State Thruway (Interstate 87), the nearest major north–south road. New York City is another 58 miles south from Newburgh on the Thruway.

The nearest passenger rail connection is the Campbell Hall station on Metro-North's Port Jervis Line, located on Watkins Road near State Route 207, approximately 7 miles southwest of Montgomery. It provides commuter rail service to the Hoboken Terminal in New Jersey. Many commuters also use Metro-North's Beacon station, 17 miles east of Montgomery, to travel to Midtown Manhattan. Some officials in Walden, where the freight spur ends, have been lobbying Metro-North to restore passenger service along the old WVRR freight spur, which also raises the possibility of a station in Montgomery.

Orange County Airport, KMGJ, is located just south of the village. Commercial passenger service is available at Stewart International Airport outside Newburgh, a short distance east via I-84.

== Demographics ==
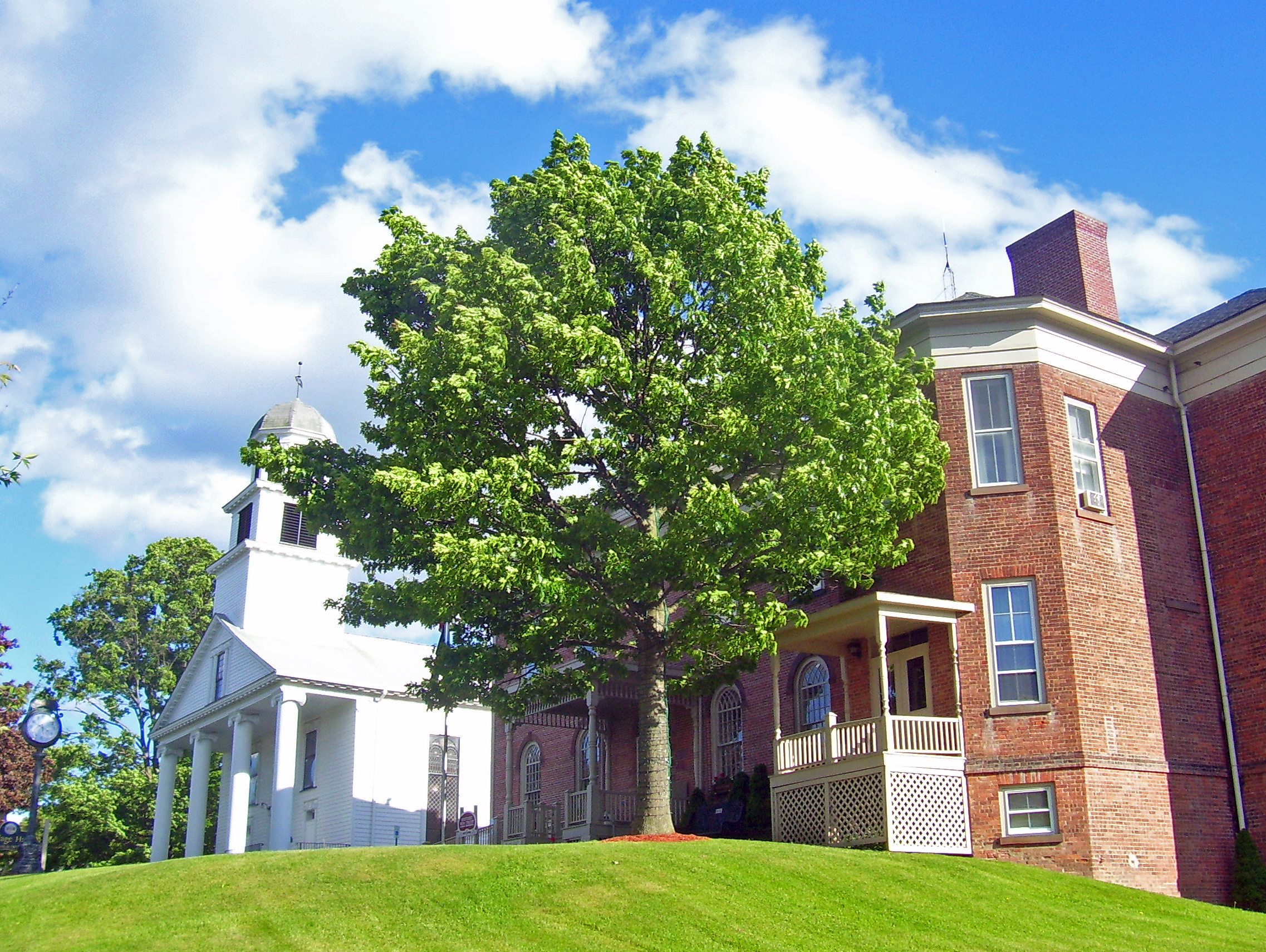
First Presbyterian Church and village hall

Historical population
Census	Pop.	Note	%±
1870	960		—
1880	935		−2.6%
1890	1,024		9.5%
1900	973		−5.0%
1910	941		−3.3%
1920	900		−4.4%
1930	884		−1.8%
1940	844		−4.5%
1950	1,063		25.9%
1960	1,312		23.4%
1970	1,533		16.8%
1980	2,316		51.1%
1990	2,696		16.4%
2000	3,636		34.9%
2010	3,814		4.9%
2020	3,834		0.5%
U.S. Decennial Census

As of the census of 2000, there were 3,636 people, 1,304 households, and 971 families residing in the village. The population density was 2,616.4 inhabitants per square mile (1,010.2/km^{2}). There were 1,338 housing units at an average density of 962.8 per square mile (371.7/km^{2}). The racial makeup of the village was 90.51% White, 4.29% Black or African American, 0.17% Native American, 0.85% Asian, 2.61% from other races, and 1.57% from two or more races. Hispanic or Latino of any race were 7.73% of the population.

There were 1,304 households, out of which 39.8% had children under the age of 18 living with them, 60.7% were married couples living together, 10.2% had a female householder with no husband present, and 25.5% were non-families. 20.8% of all households were made up of individuals, and 7.6% had someone living alone who was 65 years of age or older. The average household size was 2.77 and the average family size was 3.24.

In the village, the population was spread out, with 28.9% under the age of 18, 6.2% from 18 to 24, 32.5% from 25 to 44, 22.5% from 45 to 64, and 9.8% who were 65 years of age or older. The median age was 35 years. For every 100 females, there were 94.6 males. For every 100 females age 18 and over, there were 90.7 males.

The median income for a household in the village was $52,407, and the median income for a family was $59,952. Males had a median income of $41,923 versus $31,944 for females. The per capita income for the village was $21,204. About 4.7% of families and 7.0% of the population were below the poverty line, including 8.8% of those under age 18 and 16.4% of those age 65 or over.

== General Montgomery Day ==
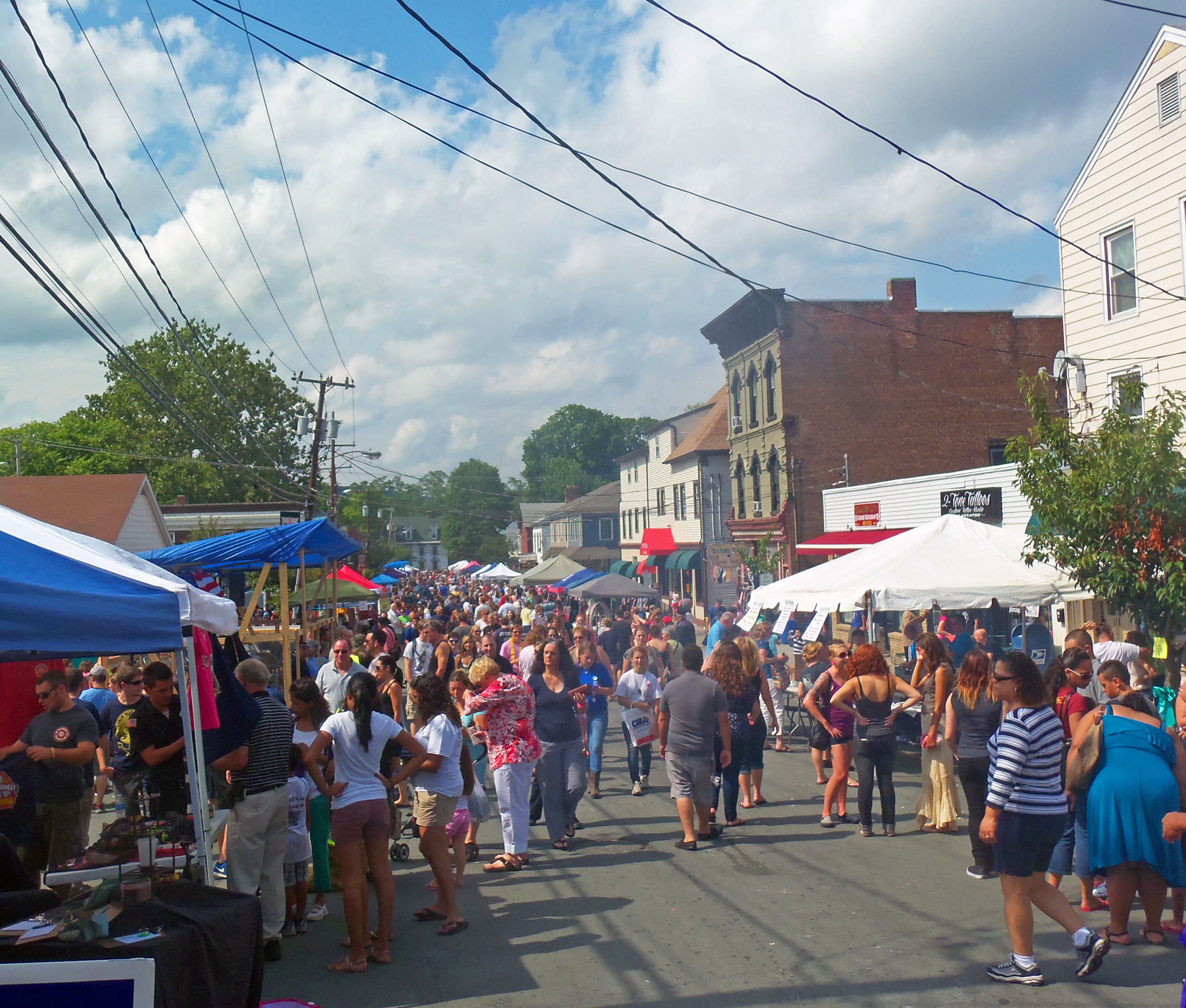
Clinton Street during 2012 General Montgomery Day

Since 1989 the village has held its annual General Montgomery Day event on the Saturday following Labor Day. The festivities begin with a parade along Union Street to village hall on Clinton Street; there is also an 8 km (5.0 mi) run. Streets are closed off downtown and vendors and various local organizations set up tents. Visitors come from all around the Hudson Valley; there have been as many as 30,000 some years. The village used to suspend its open-container law for the day until some incidents arising from the heavy drinking made them reconsider. It concludes with fireworks in the evening at the Pleasure Ground park.

== Fire protection ==
Montgomery is protected by an all volunteer Fire Department which has been active and dedicated to the community since 1810. The Montgomery Fire Department, which is the oldest volunteer fire department in Orange County, was organized on March 6, 1810, with the appointment of the first three village fire wardens. The Fire Department protects the residents of the Village of Montgomery as well as portions of the Town of Montgomery, totaling almost 8,000 citizens. The response district covers three large schools (Valley Central Middle and High Schools, Montgomery Elementary, and multiple smaller specialized schools), the Wallkill River, numerous lakes and ponds, and the Orange County Airport. The Montgomery Fire Department operates out of 1 Fire Station Located at 136 Ward Street and responds to vehicle accidents, ALS medical calls, fires, hazardous material incidents, and rescue incidents. The Montgomery Fire Department runs 2 Engines, 1 Ladder, 1 Heavy Rescue, 1 ALS Fly Car, 1 Brush Unit, 1 Rescue Boat and Ice Rescue Trailer, and 1 Fire Police Vehicle.

== Education ==
It is in the Valley Central School District (Montgomery).

== Notable residents ==
- Kate Seredy, author and illustrator of Newberry Award-winning children's book The White Stag
