= National Register of Historic Places listings in Orange County, New York =

Location of Orange County in New York

List of the National Register of Historic Places listings in Orange County, New York

This is intended to be a complete list of properties and districts listed on the National Register of Historic Places in Orange County, New York. The locations of National Register properties and districts (at least for all showing latitude and longitude coordinates below) may be seen in a map by clicking on "Map of all coordinates". Eight of the properties or districts are further designated National Historic Landmarks of the United States.

This National Park Service list is complete through NPS recent listings posted October 2, 2026.

Contents: Counties in New York
Albany (Albany) – Allegany – Bronx – Broome – Cattaraugus – Cayuga – Chautauqua – Chemung – Chenango – Clinton – Columbia – Cortland – Delaware – Dutchess (Poughkeepsie, Rhinebeck) – Erie (Buffalo) – Essex – Franklin – Fulton – Genesee – Greene – Hamilton – Herkimer – Jefferson – Kings – Lewis – Livingston – Madison – Monroe (Rochester) – Montgomery – Nassau – New York (Below 14th Street, 14th to 59th Streets, 59th to 110th Streets, Above 110th Street, Islands) – Niagara (Niagara Falls) – Oneida – Onondaga (Syracuse) – Ontario – Orange – Orleans – Oswego – Otsego – Putnam – Queens – Rensselaer – Richmond – Rockland – St. Lawrence – Saratoga – Schenectady – Schoharie – Schuyler – Seneca – Steuben – Suffolk – Sullivan – Tioga – Tompkins – Ulster – Warren – Washington – Wayne – Westchester (Northern, Southern, New Rochelle, Peekskill, Yonkers) – Wyoming – Yates

== County-wide listings ==
	Name on the Register	Image	Date listed	Location	City or town	Description
1	1841 Goshen Courthouse	1841 Goshen Courthouse	March 4, 1975 (#75001219)	101 Main St. 41°24′10″N 74°19′20″W	Goshen (village)	Greek Revival building by local architect Thornton Niven used until well into the 20th century
2	Adams–Chadeayne–Taft Estate	Adams–Chadeayne–Taft Estate	December 18, 2013 (#13000932)	1–2 Riverbank Lane; 41°26′47″N 74°00′59″W	Cornwall-on-Hudson	Small residential complex remaining intact from village's resort era.
3	African-American Cemetery	African-American Cemetery	August 16, 1996 (#96000862)	NY 416, approximately .5 miles (0.80 km) south of the junction with NY 211; 41°30′16″N 74°15′17″W	Montgomery	Early, mid-19th century cemetery for slaves and descendants recently cleaned and restored
4	Arden	Arden	November 13, 1966 (#66000561)	NY 17; 41°17′42″N 74°07′20″W	Harriman	Home of railroad magnate Edward H. Harriman in the last years of his life.
5	Balmville Cemetery	Balmville Cemetery	January 19, 2010 (#09001229)	Albany Post Road; 41°30′42″N 74°00′47″W	Balmville	Balmville Cemetery is a historic cemetery located on the grounds of Mount Saint Mary College.
6	Amelia Barr House	Amelia Barr House	November 23, 1982 (#82001211)	Mountain Rd. 41°25′34″N 74°01′26″W	Cornwall-on-Hudson	Summer, and later full-time, home of Amelia Edith Huddleston Barr, bestselling American female novelist of the 19th century
7	John G. Beakes House	John G. Beakes House	November 29, 2010 (#10000939)	134 West Main Street; 41°26′53″N 74°25′36″W	Middletown	
8	Belknap Stone House	Belknap Stone House	August 15, 2001 (#01000843)	NY 17K; 41°30′34″N 74°05′32″W	Newburgh	
9	Black Walnut Island 2	Black Walnut Island 2	August 12, 2024 (#100010633)	Address Restricted	Pine Island vicinity	Archeological site at area used by local Munsee people as fields and meeting place for several thousand years
10	John Blake House	John Blake House	December 20, 1984 (#84000521)	924 Homestead Ave. 41°29′37″N 74°12′33″W	Maybrook	1794 home of early settler and later town supervisor is largely intact; shows intersection of Federal style and pre-Revolutionary building traditions of English settlers
11	Bloomer–Dailey House and Balmville Tree	Bloomer–Dailey House and Balmville Tree	December 7, 2000 (#00001420)	83 Balmville Rd. 41°31′57″N 74°00′46″W	Balmville	Eastern cottonwood tree dating to ca. 1699, early center of Balmville and today New York's smallest state forest. Local legend has it that it was George Washington's walking stick. It was cut down in 2015 after it became a hazard to traffic.
12	Blooming Grove Church	Blooming Grove Church	December 6, 1996 (#96001434)	W side of NY 94, jct. with Old Dominion Rd. 41°24′12″N 74°11′55″W	Blooming Grove	Federal style-church built in 1824 for congregation that dates to 1758
13	Bodine Farmhouse	Bodine Farmhouse	May 3, 2006 (#06000334)	50 Wallkill Rd. 41°34′25″N 74°11′52″W	Town of Montgomery	William Bodine was a grandson of Jean Bodine, but that the record of his birth has not been found. He was granted a large tract of land in Montgomery, outside the village of Walden, and his homestead was built in 1769 and occupied by several generations of his descendants, the last about 1908.
14	Bodine's Tavern	Bodine's Tavern	May 31, 2016 (#16000307)	2 Bodine Tavern Road; 41°30′06″N 74°15′55″W	Town of Montgomery	Rest stop on Montgomery and Minisink Turnpike (now NY 211) built in 1809 and expanded 1835; used until early 20th century.
15	Jacob Bookstaver House	Jacob Bookstaver House	June 3, 1996 (#96000558)	198 Schmitt Ln. 41°33′22″N 74°14′40″W	Montgomery	Greek Revival home of early Palatine settler of western Town of Montgomery
16	The Boulders	The Boulders	August 8, 2001 (#01000848)	99 Shore Ave. 41°11′18″N 74°18′46″W	Greenwood Lake	
17	Oliver Brewster House	Oliver Brewster House	March 8, 1996 (#96000149)	66 Willow Ave. 41°26′25″N 74°02′22″W	Cornwall	1850 home of berry farmer later renovated for summer boardinghouse use with accessory farm buildings remaining; all mostly unaltered.
18	Bridge Street Historic District	Bridge Street Historic District	November 21, 1980 (#80002736)	Bridge St. 41°31′42″N 74°14′23″W	Montgomery	Oldest cluster of buildings in village of Montgomery, dating to when it was named after nearby Ward's Bridge-
19	Samuel Brooks House	Samuel Brooks House	March 8, 1996 (#96000148)	Pleasant Hill Rd. 41°25′16″N 74°04′12″W	Cornwall	1860 Gothic Revival cottage used as boardinghouse for summer guests
20	Brotherhood Winery	Brotherhood Winery	April 21, 2000 (#00000345)	Brotherhood Plaza; 41°25′55″N 74°09′46″W	Washingtonville	Oldest continuously operated U.S. winery, dating to 1838
21	Brown Farmstead	Brown Farmstead	December 7, 2005 (#05001383)	238 Browns Rd. 41°32′15″N 74°08′34″W	Montgomery	Early farmhouse of Town of Montgomery settler
22	Bull Stone House	Bull Stone House	July 18, 1974 (#74001287)	Hamptonburgh Rd. 41°26′04″N 74°15′41″W	Hamptonburgh	1722 home of early settler William Bull and his wife Sarah Wells. Nearby New World Dutch barn one of the best-preserved examples of that building, and the only one still standing in Orange County
23	William Bull III House	William Bull III House	September 25, 1986 (#86002772)	Bart Bull Rd. 41°28′23″N 74°17′12″W	Wallkill	1780 home of one of William Bull's grandsons. Remained in family for five generations
24	Bull-Jackson House	Bull-Jackson House	May 17, 1974 (#74001288)	NY 416, northwest of Campbell Hall; 41°28′07″N 74°16′39″W	Campbell Hall	18th-century stone home of one of Thomas Bull's sons remained in family for almost two centuries. Today a county museum.
25	Camp Olmsted	Camp Olmsted	November 23, 1982 (#82001212)	114 Bayview Ave. 41°26′17″N 74°00′19″W	Cornwall-on-Hudson	Summer camp built in 1900 to allow children of New York's Five Points neighborhood to get fresh Hudson Valley air for a few weeks.
26	Canterbury Presbyterian Church	Canterbury Presbyterian Church	June 3, 1996 (#96000556)	30 Clinton St. 41°26′07″N 74°01′55″W	Cornwall	Federal-style church used until the early 2000s.
27	Carvey-Gatfield House	Carvey-Gatfield House	March 8, 1996 (#96000152)	375 Angola Rd. 41°24′37″N 74°03′21″W	Cornwall	Surviving stone house of early Cornwall settler
28	Cash–Draper House	Cash–Draper House	June 26, 2017 (#100001245)	59 Wickham Avenue; 41°27′00″N 74°25′12″W	Middletown	Temple-style Greek Revival house built for farmer in 1842
29	Checkerboard Inn	Checkerboard Inn	November 29, 2006 (#06001078)	1292 Orange Turnpike; 41°18′00″N 74°11′08″W	Monroe	Ca. 1790 house later used as inn serving travelers on the Orange Turnpike
30	Christ Church	Christ Church	August 15, 2008 (#08000771)	6 Orchard St. 41°26′46″N 74°25′04″W	Middletown	
31	Church of the Holy Innocents and Rectory	Church of the Holy Innocents and Rectory	November 23, 1982 (#82001213)	112 Main St. 41°22′24″N 73°57′54″W	Highland Falls	1841 Episcopal church designed by Robert Walter Weir in memory of his children. Louis Comfort Tiffany stained-glass window depicting creation donated in memory of J. Pierpont Morgan, a congregant in summer months.
32	Church Park Historic District	Church Park Historic District	November 17, 1980 (#80002735)	Park Pl., Main and Webster Sts. 41°24′14″N 74°19′20″W	Goshen (village)	Core of 19th-century village of Goshen, with many surviving buildings
33	A. J. Clark Store	A. J. Clark Store	December 6, 1996 (#96001432)	286 Main St. 41°26′08″N 74°02′04″W	Cornwall	Intact Italianate commercial building with balcony, built during Cornwall's ascendancy as a resort town in the mid- and late 19th century
34	Hulet Clark Farmstead	Hulet Clark Farmstead	November 5, 1998 (#98001343)	207 S. Plank Rd. 41°21′20″N 74°32′28″W	Westtown	Largely intact early 19th-century home of Clark, a contemporary settler who later became Minisink town supervisor, in English vernacular style
35	Isaac Cocks House	Isaac Cocks House	March 8, 1996 (#96000153)	Old Pleasant Hill Rd. 41°25′34″N 74°03′54″W	Cornwall	
36	Colden Family Cemetery	Colden Family Cemetery	February 9, 2005 (#05000017)	Off of Maple Ave. 41°31′17″N 74°08′45″W	Montgomery	Final resting place of immediate descendants of Cadwallader Colden, area landowner and one of the last colonial governors of New York.
37	Colden Hill Farm	Colden Hill Farm	September 18, 2020 (#100005568)	181 North Drury Ln. 41°31′54″N 74°07′41″W	Montgomery	
38	Colden Mansion Ruins	Colden Mansion Ruins	July 24, 2007 (#07000758)	NY 17K; 41°31′35″N 74°07′56″W	Montgomery	Remains of 18th-century home of Cadwallader Colden Jr., fallen into disrepair after mid-20th century neglect
39	Cornwall Friends Meeting House	Cornwall Friends Meeting House	December 8, 1988 (#88002751)	275 Quaker Ave. 41°26′02″N 74°02′36″W	Cornwall	Intact Quaker meeting house from late 18th century still in use. Oldest religious building in Cornwall.
40	Cosman Family Cemetery	Cosman Family Cemetery	November 8, 2006 (#06001002)	Lattintown Rd. 41°34′54″N 74°00′22″W	Middle Hope	
41	Cottage in the Pines	Cottage in the Pines	October 6, 2015 (#15000515)	1200 Route 42; 41°29′02″N 74°44′16″W	Rio	Intact 1895 Catskill boardinghouse complex
42	John A. Crabtree House	John A. Crabtree House	August 6, 1998 (#98001001)	15 Factory St. 41°31′43″N 74°13′36″W	Montgomery	Home of cofounder of nearby Montgomery Worsted Mills
43	Cragston Dependencies	Cragston Dependencies	November 23, 1982 (#82001214)	NY 218; 41°21′09″N 73°58′14″W	Highlands	
44	Crane House	Crane House	May 18, 2018 (#SG100002465)	220 Dosen Road; 41°30′39″N 74°26′05″W	Middletown vicinity	1897 Queen Anne farmhouse and associated structures built by successful local dairy farming family
45	David Crawford House	David Crawford House	September 27, 1972 (#72000899)	189 Montgomery St. 41°30′32″N 74°00′30″W	Newburgh	1834 Greek Revival home of river captain
46	John I Crawford Farm	John I Crawford Farm	August 6, 1998 (#98001000)	NY 302, 1 mile (1.6 km) northeast of the junction of NY 302 and Thompson Ridge Rd. 41°34′36″N 74°20′12″W	Crawford	Home of settler who gave Town of Crawford its name
47	Cromwell Manor	Cromwell Manor	June 3, 1996 (#96000555)	Angola Rd., approximately 0.25 miles (0.40 km) south of the junction with US 9W; 41°25′27″N 74°02′42″W	Cornwall	1835 Greek Revival home of, among others, Joseph Sutherland, son of major early landowner. Today a bed and breakfast. One of the first large houses built in Cornwall not intended to be a farmhouse.
48	Deer Hill	Deer Hill	November 23, 1982 (#82001215)	58 Deerhill Rd. 41°25′27″N 74°00′59″W	Cornwall	
49	Delaware and Hudson Canal	Delaware and Hudson Canal	November 24, 1968 (#68000051)	Delaware and Hudson Canal; 41°27′33″N 74°36′15″W	Cuddebackville, Deer Park, and more	Coal-carrying canal historic district that runs through other counties in New York and Pennsylvania as well. Key link in supplying New York City with anthracite coal in the 19th century.
50	Denniston–Steidle House	Denniston–Steidle House	May 8, 2012 (#12000257)	575 Jackson Ave. 41°27′43″N 74°06′23″W	New Windsor	1875 farmhouse is a rare example of non-reinforced lime-based concrete construction in region.
51	Abraham Dickerson Farmhouse	Abraham Dickerson Farmhouse	November 3, 1995 (#95001286)	171 W. Searsville Rd. 41°34′21″N 74°15′11″W	Montgomery	Home built in late 18th century by migrant from Long Island. Later a boardinghouse and dance hall.
52	District School No. 9	District School No. 9	September 15, 1988 (#88001451)	NY 17A; 41°22′35″N 74°20′59″W	Goshen (town)	School building dating to at least 1790s; according to legend Washington stopped to talk to students one day when passing by
53	Dock Hill Road Extension Stone Arch Bridge	Dock Hill Road Extension Stone Arch Bridge	January 13, 2010 (#09001230)	Dock Hill Rd. Extension; 41°26′34″N 74°00′25″W	Cornwall on Hudson	
54	Dodge-Greenleaf House	Dodge-Greenleaf House	March 5, 2008 (#08000142)	2009 NY 211; 41°28′37″N 74°32′29″W	Otisville	Well-preserved Gothic Revival home of local businessman from mid-19th century; built when that style was very new. Later home to workers constructing the Otisville Tunnel, which runs beneath the property.
55	Dubois-Phelps House	Dubois-Phelps House	August 21, 1997 (#97000939)	90 Walkill Rd. 41°34′32″N 74°11′42″W	Montgomery	Greek Revival home of early Town of Montgomery settlers.
56	Dunning House	Dunning House	December 28, 2001 (#01001383)	633 Ridgebury Rd. 41°23′05″N 74°27′26″W	Wawayanda	Late 18th-century house rebuilt and added onto in different, changing styles over the next century.
57	Dutch Reformed Church	Dutch Reformed Church	December 18, 1970 (#70000425)	132 Grand St. 41°30′16″N 74°00′32″W	Newburgh	1835 Alexander Jackson Davis church is his only surviving one in Greek Revival style, also his latest surviving church largely unaltered from his design. Currently the focus of intensive restoration efforts.
58	Dutchess Quarry Cave Site	Dutchess Quarry Cave Site	January 18, 1974 (97000512 #74001289; 97000512)	Address Restricted	Goshen (town)	Artifacts from earliest known inhabitants of Wallkill Valley, 12,000 years ago, found in and around actively used quarry.
59	East End Historic District	East End Historic District	September 12, 1985 (#85002426)	Roughly bounded by Robinson Ave., LeRoy Pl., Water St., Bay View Terr., Monument & Renwick Sts. 41°30′05″N 74°00′47″W	Newburgh	Most contributing properties of any historic district in state, consisting of intact 19th-century buildings and homes.
60	Echo Lawn Estate	Echo Lawn Estate	March 23, 2009 (#09000157)	River Road at Stone Gate Drive; 41°32′05″N 74°00′26″W	Balmville	
61	Edmonston House	Edmonston House	March 2, 1979 (#79001616)	NY 94; 41°27′12″N 74°03′45″W	Vails Gate	Medical facilities for Continental Army troops encamped nearby during the last years of the Revolutionary War
62	Erie Railroad Station	Erie Railroad Station	April 11, 1980 (#80002739)	Jersey Ave. and Fowler St. 41°22′20″N 74°41′30″W	Port Jervis	Old Queen Anne-style station built by Erie Railroad and used for passenger service until the 1970s. Today restored and used as professional offices.
63	Everett-Bradner House	Everett-Bradner House	October 27, 2004 (#04001204)	156 South St. 41°23′22″N 74°19′35″W	Goshen (village)	
64	First Congregational Church of Middletown	First Congregational Church of Middletown	December 7, 2005 (#05001382)	35 E. Main St. 41°26′44″N 74°25′10″W	Middletown	One of the oldest buildings in contemporary Middletown, predating city's establishment.
65	First Presbyterian Church of Chester	First Presbyterian Church of Chester	January 7, 1998 (#97001622)	106-108 Main St. 41°21′24″N 74°16′40″W	Chester	Mostly intact 1854 Greek Revival building is third home to a congregation that dates to 1783
66	First Presbyterian Church of Highland Falls	First Presbyterian Church of Highland Falls	November 23, 1982 (#82001216)	140 Main St. 41°22′19″N 73°57′55″W	Highland Falls	1868 Romanesque Revival church by Frederick Clarke Withers
67	Firthcliffe Firehouse	Firthcliffe Firehouse	June 3, 1996 (#96000554)	196 Willow Ave. 41°26′29″N 74°02′30″W	Cornwall	Former firehouse now a hair salon
68	Fort Decker	Fort Decker	June 13, 1974 (#74001291)	127 W. Main St. 41°22′43″N 74°42′07″W	Port Jervis	Oldest building in Port Jervis, made from stones of demolished eponymous trading post. Currently used as local history museum.
69	Fort Montgomery Site	Fort Montgomery Site	November 28, 1972 (#72000897)	Fort Montgomery State Historic Site; 41°19′26″N 73°59′13″W	Fort Montgomery	Site of unsuccessful Colonial stand against British.
70	Fury Brook Farm	Fury Brook Farm	September 15, 2004 (#04000995)	Kings Highway; 41°19′34″N 74°16′50″W	Sugar Loaf	First farm established on the old Wawayanda Path in 1731. Horses for Continental Army bred here.
71	Silas Gardner House	Silas Gardner House	March 28, 1980 (#80002734)	1141 Union Ave. 41°31′36″N 74°04′13″W	Gardnertown	Stone home of early settler for whom neighborhood is named
72	Gatehouse on Deerhill Road	Gatehouse on Deerhill Road	November 23, 1982 (#82001217)	Deerhill Rd. 41°25′32″N 74°01′14″W	Cornwall	Rare example of Norman Revival style gatehouse in Hudson Valley; today in use as residence.
73	Grace Episcopal Church	Grace Episcopal Church	November 29, 2010 (#10000945)	58 North Street; 41°26′48″N 74°25′10″W	Middletown	
74	Gumaer Cemetery	Gumaer Cemetery	September 18, 2017 (#100001626)	Neversink Preserve, Guymard Tpk. vicinity 41°26′13″N 74°36′52″W	Godeffroy vicinity	Early 18th century settler cemetery is oldest European burial ground in Orange County
75	Benjamin Haines House	Benjamin Haines House	June 3, 1996 (#96000560)	114 Coleman Rd. 41°32′05″N 74°11′04″W	Montgomery	House of an early Montgomery farm family
76	Elias Hand House	Elias Hand House	August 28, 1998 (#98001119)	NY 32; 41°24′01″N 74°04′51″W	Mountainville	
77	Walter Hand House	Walter Hand House	March 8, 1996 (#96000154)	520 Angola Rd. 41°24′20″N 74°03′52″W	Cornwall	Built in 1870 for use as both boardinghouse in summer and farmhouse year-round
78	Harrison Meeting House Site and Cemetery	Harrison Meeting House Site and Cemetery	March 9, 1999 (#98000133)	Co. Rd. 416, south of the junction of NY 211 and Co. Rd. 416; 41°30′39″N 74°15′09″W	Montgomery	Site of early meeting house for Palatine settlers of Montgomery; never rebuilt after fire
79	Haskell House	Haskell House	June 4, 1973 (#73001244)	West of New Windsor off NY 32; 41°28′50″N 74°02′33″W	New Windsor	Demolished 1720s-era home
80	Vermont Hatch Mansion	Vermont Hatch Mansion	May 2, 1995 (#95000480)	Old Pleasant Hill Rd. 41°25′28″N 74°03′35″W	Cornwall	
81	Jacob and Caroline Hawkins House	Jacob and Caroline Hawkins House	June 21, 2019 (#100004088)	3764 NY 208; 41°28′23″N 74°12′30″W	Rock Tavern	Intact 1852 Greek Revival farmhouse
82	John R. Hays House	John R. Hays House	August 22, 2002 (#02000880)	45 Maple St. 41°33′33″N 74°11′19″W	Walden	Second Empire-style home of Walden businessman and Union Army officer in Civil War
83	Highland Falls Railroad Depot	Highland Falls Railroad Depot	November 23, 1982 (#82001218)	Dock Rd. 41°22′28″N 73°57′41″W	Highland Falls	1880 Shingle Style building, now house, is one of only two passenger stations left on west side of Hudson
84	Highland Falls Village Hall	Highland Falls Village Hall	November 23, 1982 (#82001219)	Main St. 41°22′15″N 73°57′57″W	Highland Falls	1894 Italianate building that originally housed local bank
85	Nathaniel Hill Brick House	Nathaniel Hill Brick House	January 5, 1978 (#78001893)	East of Montgomery on NY 17 K 41°31′34″N 74°10′34″W	Montgomery	1760s Georgian home built by Irish immigrant who had to import bricks from England as they were not then made in the area.
86	Hillside Cemetery	Hillside Cemetery	September 7, 1994 (#94001027)	Mulberry St. 41°26′32″N 74°25′51″W	Middletown	Calvert Vaux-designed cemetery is final resting place of many notable local residents from the 19th century.
87	Historic Track	Historic Track	October 15, 1966 (#66000560)	Main St. 41°24′11″N 74°19′07″W	Goshen (village)	Oldest continuously operated horse racing facility in U.S., site of Harness Racing Museum & Hall of Fame
88	Hopewell Presbyterian Church	Hopewell Presbyterian Church	January 7, 1998 (#97001621)	NY 302, at jct. of County Road 17; 41°34′14″N 74°20′08″W	Thompson Ridge	1831 stone Gothic Revival church; home to congregation established in 1778
89	Webb Horton House	Webb Horton House	April 26, 1990 (#90000690)	115 South St. 41°26′19″N 74°25′34″W	Middletown	Ornate 1902 mansion of Middletown businessman; now administration building at SUNY Orange
90	House at 116 Main Street	House at 116 Main Street	November 23, 1982 (#82001221)	365 Main St. 41°22′23″N 73°57′53″W	Highland Falls	Most significant Italian villa-style house in village, dating to 1865. Now at 365 Main Street due to renumbering
91	House at 37 Center Street	House at 37 Center Street	November 23, 1982 (#82001220)	20 Center St. 41°22′12″N 73°58′04″W	Highland Falls	Mid-19th century Greek Revival house is possibly one of the oldest extant buildings in Highland Falls
92	Howell-Hinchman Tannery	Howell-Hinchman Tannery	May 18, 2026 (#100013007)	33 Mulberry Street; 41°26′35″N 74°25′27″W	Middletown	Tannery built in 1862; used by leading producer of Russian and patent leather through 1937
93	Huguenot Schoolhouse	Huguenot Schoolhouse	August 21, 1997 (#97000938)	Old Grange Rd., south of the junction of Old Grange and Big Pond Rds. 41°25′11″N 74°37′58″W	Deerpark	Well-preserved one-room schoolhouse now used as local history museum
94	The Kellogg House		April 16, 2001 (#00001414)	Old Pleasant Hill Rd. 41°25′31″N 74°03′57″W	Cornwall	
95	Knox Headquarters	Knox Headquarters	November 9, 1972 (#72000901)	Quassaick Ave. and Forge Hill Rd. 41°27′15″N 74°02′56″W	Vails Gate	Stone house built by William Bull for Ellison family ca. 1730; later used as headquarters by General Henry Knox during nearby Continental Army encampment
96	LeDoux/Healey House	LeDoux/Healey House	November 23, 1982 (#82001222)	60 Deerhill Rd. 41°25′27″N 74°01′05″W	Cornwall	One of the best Shingle style houses in the Hudson Highlands. Built in 1910
97	Lower Dock Hill Road Stone Arch Bridge	Lower Dock Hill Road Stone Arch Bridge	April 28, 2010 (#10000227)	Dock Hill Road; 41°26′35″N 74°00′12″W	Cornwall-on-Hudson	
98	Mortimer L. Mapes House & Seward Homestead		November 29, 2011 (#10000942)	35 N Main St. 41°19′59″N 74°21′24″W	Florida	
99	Maple Lawn	Maple Lawn	June 28, 1984 (#84002879)	24 Downing St. 41°31′26″N 74°00′44″W	Balmville	Exemplary 1859 Picturesque Frederick Clarke Withers cottage-style house nearly intact
100	Thomas McDowell House	Thomas McDowell House	July 28, 2004 (#04000753)	517 Lake Rd. 41°28′09″N 74°06′35″W	New Windsor	1770s-era house is well-preserved home of one of Little Britain's original Irish American settlers.
101	Gomez Mill House	Gomez Mill House	January 29, 1973 (#73001245)	Mill House Rd. 41°34′42″N 73°58′56″W	Newburgh	Earliest known residence of a Jewish American still extant. Foundation and first story date to 1712. Home to papermaker Dard Hunter during early 20th century; today a museum
102	Johannes Miller House	Johannes Miller House	November 21, 1980 (#80002737)	272 Union St. 41°30′43″N 74°15′11″W	Montgomery	Home of investor in Newburgh–Cochecton Turnpike and other early 19th-century roads
103	Milliken-Smith Farm	Milliken-Smith Farm	March 25, 2009 (#09000158)	279 Bailey Road; 41°32′04″N 74°12′36″W	Montgomery	
104	Gilbert Millspaugh House	Gilbert Millspaugh House	November 7, 2005 (#05001216)	32 Church St. 41°33′32″N 74°11′16″W	Walden	Victorian cottage-style home of local merchant
105	Moffat Library	Moffat Library	August 19, 1994 (#94001000)	W. Main St. 41°25′42″N 74°10′06″W	Washingtonville	Built for the village in 1887 by native son David Moffat with Tiffany stained-glass windows. Renovated and restored in 2010s following severe flood damage after Hurricane Irene
106	Montgomery Water Works Building	Montgomery Water Works Building	February 9, 2005 (#05000019)	239 Ward St. 41°31′30″N 74°13′38″W	Montgomery	Built for the village in 1895 by Montgomery Mills cofounder Arthur Pratchett
107	Montgomery Worsted Mills	Montgomery Worsted Mills	November 21, 1980 (#80002738)	Factory St. 41°31′51″N 74°13′26″W	Montgomery	19th-century textile mill on Wallkill still in business today, although primarily as power generator
108	Montgomery-Grand-Liberty Streets Historic District	Montgomery-Grand-Liberty Streets Historic District	July 16, 1973 (#73001246)	Montgomery, Grand, and Liberty Sts. 41°30′25″N 74°00′35″W	Newburgh	19th-century homes and churches of city's wealthier residents.
109	Jeremiah Morehouse House	Jeremiah Morehouse House	April 12, 2006 (#06000259)	11 Hathorn Rd. 41°14′42″N 74°22′08″W	Warwick	1767 house extensively renovated in 1840s
110	Moses Mould House	Moses Mould House	August 22, 2002 (#02000876)	1743 NY 17K; 41°31′44″N 74°15′57″W	Montgomery	Home of early Palatine settler in Montgomery
111	Mountainville Grange Hall	Mountainville Grange Hall	June 3, 1996 (#96000557)	NY 32, south of the junction with Creamery Rd. 41°24′01″N 74°04′46″W	Cornwall	Surviving Grange hall from early 20th century used as local Masonic Lodge
112	Neversink Valley Grange Hall No. 1530	Neversink Valley Grange Hall No. 1530	December 11, 2013 (#13000910)	35 Grange Rd. 41°25′13″N 74°38′02″W	Huguenot	Classic 1934 Grange hall was early community center.
113	Newburgh Colored Burial Ground	Newburgh Colored Burial Ground	March 31, 2010 (#10000137)	Broadway & Robinson Avenue (US 9W); 41°30′03″N 74°01′17″W	Newburgh	Slave cemetery discovered during courthouse expansion.
114	New Windsor Cantonment	New Windsor Cantonment	July 31, 1972 (#72000898)	Temple Hill Rd. 41°28′09″N 74°03′35″W	New Windsor	Last encampment of the Continental Army; here Washington put down the Newburgh Conspiracy
115	New York, Ontario & Western Railway Company Middletown Station	New York, Ontario & Western Railway Company Middletown Station	April 7, 2014 (#14000129)	2 Low Ave. 41°27′08″N 74°24′55″W	Middletown	Abandoned yet intact early 20th-century station from major regional railroad
116	New York State Armory	New York State Armory	June 18, 1981 (#81000411)	Broadway and Johnson St. 41°29′59″N 74°00′50″W	Newburgh	John A. Wood-designed late 19th-century building now used as local offices of Orange County Department of Social Services
117	Old Town Cemetery and Palatine Church Site	Old Town Cemetery and Palatine Church Site	June 30, 2000 (#00000746)	Grand St. 41°30′27″N 74°00′36″W	Newburgh	Burial ground of early Newburgh settlers features Robinson mausoleum, only Egyptian Revival tomb in the world with both a mastaba and a pyramid, possibly designed by Alexander Jackson Davis.
118	Oliver Avenue Bridge		July 19, 1984 (#84002882)	Oliver Ave. 41°27′14″N 74°26′00″W	Middletown	Now-demolished railroad bridge
119	Olivet Chapel	Olivet Chapel	June 9, 2010 (#10000336)	201 W. Main St. 41°24′05″N 74°19′40″W	Goshen	
120	Orange Mill Historic District	Orange Mill Historic District	May 1, 1997 (#97000357)	Powder Mill Rd., near jct. with NY 52; 41°31′25″N 74°03′39″W	Newburgh	Ruins of extensive 19th-century gunpowder mill complex scattered around county park
121	Palisades Interstate Parkway	Palisades Interstate Parkway	October 15, 1966 (#66000890)	W bank of the Hudson River to Bear Mountain; 40°57′19″N 73°55′54″W	Fort Lee and vicinity	Scenic road built to connect New York City with parks in lower Hudson Valley
122	Paramount Theatre	Paramount Theatre	March 6, 2002 (#02000136)	South St. 41°26′39″N 74°25′17″W	Middletown	1930 Art Deco movie theatre in Middletown
123	Parry House	Parry House	November 23, 1982 (#82001223)	Michel Rd. 41°22′09″N 73°57′45″W	Highland Falls	
124	Patchett House	Patchett House	November 21, 1980 (#80004394)	232 Ward St. 41°31′34″N 74°13′40″W	Montgomery (village)	Old way station on Newburgh–Cochecton Turnpike, later home to cofounder of Montgomery Worsted Mills; now an art gallery
125	James "Squire" Patton House	James "Squire" Patton House	May 12, 2008 (#08000409)	NY 207 W. of jct. with Temple Hill Rd. 41°29′07″N 74°04′24″W	New Windsor	Well-preserved home of early landowner is excellent example of local vernacular styles; today used as Newburgh police K-9 training facility.
126	Peachcroft	Peachcroft	March 10, 1995 (#95000211)	River Rd. 41°32′48″N 74°12′49″W	Montgomery	1810 Federal farmhouse made over in Queen Anne Style in 1893
127	Peale's Barber Farm Mastodon Exhumation Site	Peale's Barber Farm Mastodon Exhumation Site	October 20, 2009 (#09000863)	Rt. 17K; 41°31′35″N 74°13′04″W	Montgomery	Site of Charles Willson Peale's 1806 exhumation of a mastodon
128	Gideon Pelton Farm	Gideon Pelton Farm	November 3, 1995 (#95001287)	250 Rockefellow Ln. 41°30′16″N 74°14′25″W	Montgomery	Combination of 1770 stone house and later Greek Revival farmhouse
129	Patrick Piggot House	Patrick Piggot House	August 28, 1998 (#98001115)	105 Angola Rd. 41°25′40″N 74°02′32″W	Cornwall	Old farmhouse converted to boardinghouse during Cornwall's resort days.
130	Pine Terrace	Pine Terrace	November 23, 1982 (#82001224)	Main St. 41°21′52″N 73°57′54″W	Highland Falls	
131	Powelton Club	Powelton Club	December 20, 1999 (#99001488)	2963 Balmville Rd. 41°31′21″N 74°01′02″W	Balmville	One of the five oldest golf courses in New York, and among ten oldest in U.S.
132	Primitive Baptist Church of Brookfield	Primitive Baptist Church of Brookfield	November 13, 1976 (#76001260)	US 6; 41°23′25″N 74°28′25″W	Slate Hill	1792 church is one of the first two buildings in Slate Hill's history
133	Culver Randel House and Mill	Culver Randel House and Mill	May 20, 1998 (#98000554)	65 Randall St. 41°20′29″N 74°21′11″W	Florida	House, built 1850, is considered an excellent example of Picturesque mode applied to Italianate house
134	Rest Haven	Rest Haven	June 26, 2017 (#100001246)	236 High St. 41°19′44″N 74°11′44″W	Monroe	1903 home later turned into seasonal home for blind women with support, and frequent visits from, Helen Keller
135	River View House	River View House	November 23, 1982 (#82001225)	146 Bayview Ave. 41°26′24″N 74°00′08″W	Cornwall	
136	Rushmore Memorial Library	Rushmore Memorial Library	April 11, 2008 (#08000276)	Weygant Hill Rd. & NY 32; 41°20′57″N 74°07′30″W	Highland Mills	1924 Arts and Crafts library built with donation from area resident Charles E. Rushmore
137	St. Andrew's Cemetery	St. Andrew's Cemetery	December 23, 2008 (#08001232)	St. Andrew's Rd. and Plains Rd. 41°34′08″N 74°08′44″W	Walden	
138	St. Andrew's Episcopal Church & Rectory	St. Andrew's Episcopal Church & Rectory	June 13, 2008 (#08000513)	13 & 15 Walnut St. 41°33′36″N 74°11′24″W	Walden	1871 Gothic Revival church designed by Charles Babcock in Ecclesiological mode
139	St. Mark's Baptist Church	St. Mark's Baptist Church	January 28, 2004 (#03001516)	213 Main St. 41°22′02″N 73°57′59″W	Highland Falls	
140	St. Mark's Episcopal Church	St. Mark's Episcopal Church	November 23, 1982 (#82001227)	Canterbury Rd. and US 9W; 41°19′49″N 73°59′18″W	Fort Montgomery	Built in 1923 to serve weekend vacationers coming over the nearby Bear Mountain Bridge
141	St. Thomas Episcopal Church	St. Thomas Episcopal Church	July 12, 2006 (#06000566)	47 Old Rte 9W (188 River Rd.); 41°28′13″N 74°01′05″W	New Windsor	Earliest Episcopal congregation in the county, present building completed in 1848 by a drafter for A. J. Davis. Based upon an English church built in 1280
142	Sands-Ring House	Sands-Ring House	March 8, 1996 (#96000150)	Main St. 41°26′23″N 74°01′57″W	Cornwall	Home of early Quaker settler in Cornwall; George Washington reportedly dined here
143	Sawyer Farmhouse	Sawyer Farmhouse	June 30, 2005 (#05000636)	178 Maple Ave. 41°22′28″N 74°22′46″W	Goshen (town)	
144	Scribner House	Scribner House	March 8, 1996 (#96000157)	19 Roe Ave. 41°26′15″N 74°01′27″W	Cornwall	1910 summer home built for Charles Scribner II combines Shingle and Colonial Revival styles
145	William Henry Seward Memorial		December 9, 1999 (#99001489)	Main St. 41°20′00″N 74°21′26″W	Florida	Daniel Chester French-sculpted memorial to native who later become Secretary of State
146	Jacob Shafer House	Jacob Shafer House	August 16, 1996 (#96000864)	388 Kaisertown Rd. 41°31′23″N 74°16′15″W	Montgomery	Greek Revival home of early settler
147	Shorter House	Shorter House	August 24, 1998 (#98001004)	Andrews Rd. 41°34′13″N 74°20′39″W	Crawford	Greek Revival home of early settler
148	Smith Clove Meetinghouse	Smith Clove Meetinghouse	January 11, 1974 (#74001290)	Quaker Rd. 41°21′40″N 74°06′40″W	Highland Mills	1803 Quaker meeting house still used once a year. Oldest religious building in the town and village of Woodbury.
149	The Smith House	The Smith House	August 8, 1996 (#96000863)	2727 Albany Post Rd. 41°33′09″N 74°14′13″W	Montgomery	Greek Revival house built on site settled in mid-18th century
150	Southfield Furnace Ruin	Southfield Furnace Ruin	November 2, 1973 (#73001243)	Southfields off NY 17; 41°15′14″N 74°10′57″W	Tuxedo	Remnants of 19th-century iron smelting furnace
151	The Squirrels	The Squirrels	November 23, 1982 (#82001226)	225 Main St. 41°22′03″N 73°57′52″W	Highland Falls	
152	Sterling Mountain Fire Observation Tower and Observer's Cabin	Sterling Mountain Fire Observation Tower and Observer's Cabin	July 28, 2006 (#06000644)	Sterling Forest State Park; 41°11′42″N 74°16′44″W	Greenwood Lake	
153	General John Hathorn Stone House	General John Hathorn Stone House	March 12, 2001 (#01000252)	Hathorn Rd. 41°14′48″N 74°22′16″W	Warwick	First built in 1773, home of general who led militia at Minisink Ford and later served in state legislature and Congress shows German influence on English building traditions.
154	Stonihurst	Stonihurst	November 23, 1982 (#82001228)	NY 218; 41°21′24″N 73°58′01″W	Highland Falls	
155	Storm King Highway	Storm King Highway	November 23, 1982 (#82001229)	NY 218; 41°26′15″N 73°59′49″W	Cornwall and Highlands	Scenic highway built in 1916 along mountainside 420 feet (130 m) above Hudson River
156	Sugar Loaf Historic District	Sugar Loaf Historic District	November 15, 2024 (#100010981)	1353-1410 Kings Highway, 8-16 Pine Hill Road, 56-62 Wood Road; 41°19′13″N 74°17′12″W	Sugar Loaf	
157	Daniel Sutherland House	Daniel Sutherland House	March 8, 1996 (#96000147)	32 Angola Rd. 41°26′00″N 74°02′15″W	Cornwall	Stick-Eastlake-styled house of descendant of early Cornwall landowner, on family lands.
158	David Sutherland House	David Sutherland House	March 8, 1996 (#96000146)	70 Angola Rd. 41°25′50″N 74°02′21″W	Cornwall	1770 fieldstone house built by descendant of one of Cornwall's early landowners.
159	Taylor-Corwin House	Taylor-Corwin House	January 5, 2005 (#04001442)	112 Maple Ave. 41°36′34″N 74°18′10″W	Pine bush	One of the earliest houses in Pine Bush when built in 1840. A popular destination for local railroad passengers due to view of Shawangunk Ridge
160	John Tears Inn	John Tears Inn	August 21, 1997 (#97000940)	1224 Goshen Tnpk. 41°30′02″N 74°22′22″W	Wallkill	1770s-era inn was major stopover on the Goshen Turnpike
161	Alexander Thompson House	Alexander Thompson House	June 13, 1997 (#97000568)	Jct. of NY 302 and Thompson Ridge Rd. 41°34′14″N 74°20′03″W	Thompson Ridge	Home of son of original settler of era, later expanded with Federal-style addition in early 19th century
162	Andrew Thompson Farmstead	Andrew Thompson Farmstead	January 5, 2005 (#04001443)	RD Rte 302; 41°33′44″N 74°20′23″W	Thompson Ridge	1810 home of son of early settler combines late Federal and early Greek Revival elements; has remained intact since
163	Robert A. Thompson House	Robert A. Thompson House	January 30, 1998 (#98000039)	NY 302, south of the junction of NY 302 and Dickerson Ave. 41°33′37″N 74°20′31″W	Thompson Ridge	1822 stone house of settler for whom Thompson Ridge is named
164	Tuxedo Park	Tuxedo Park	March 13, 1980 (#80002740)	Tuxedo Lake and environs 41°12′05″N 74°12′24″W	Tuxedo Park	First gated community in U.S.
165	Tuxedo Park Railroad Station	Tuxedo Park Railroad Station	December 13, 2000 (#00001529)	NY 17; 41°11′36″N 74°11′14″W	Tuxedo	Surviving 1885 structure, renovated in early 2010s; built around same time as Tuxedo Park
166	Tweddle Farmstead	Tweddle Farmstead	September 9, 1999 (#99001134)	263 Beaver Dam Rd. 41°30′27″N 74°13′42″W	Montgomery	Early 19th-century farmhouse renovated in Greek Revival style in the 1830s.
167	U.S. Military Academy	U.S. Military Academy	October 15, 1966 (#66000562)	NY 218; 41°23′43″N 73°58′18″W	West Point	Oldest continuously operated military post in U.S., and alma mater of many notable American generals and Army officers.
168	Union Chapel	Union Chapel	November 21, 2012 (#12000958)	Cornwall Yacht Club, Shore Rd. 41°26′35″N 73°59′58″W	Cornwall-on-Hudson vicinity	
169	Union Street-Academy Hill Historic District	Union Street-Academy Hill Historic District	November 21, 1980 (#80004395)	Roughly bounded by Ward St., Wallkill Ave., Sears and Hanover Sts. 41°31′30″N 74°14′18″W	Montgomery (village)	Historic core of village of Montgomery, with houses and other buildings dating from late 18th to early 20th centuries
170	Upland Lawn	Upland Lawn	December 6, 1996 (#96001433)	16 Duncan Ln. 41°26′25″N 74°01′13″W	Cornwall	
171	US Bullion Depository, West Point, New York	US Bullion Depository, West Point, New York	February 18, 1988 (#88000027)	Victor Constant Rd. 41°23′46″N 73°58′56″W	West Point	Known in the past as the "Fort Knox of silver", 1937 facility produced pennies and still makes commemorative coins
172	US Post Office-Goshen	US Post Office-Goshen	May 11, 1989 (#88002527)	20 Grand St. 41°24′09″N 74°19′34″W	Goshen (village)	Brick Colonial Revival post office built as New Deal project in 1935; features interior mural of Historic Track
173	US Post Office-Newburgh	US Post Office-Newburgh	May 11, 1989 (#88002367)	215-217 Liberty St. 41°30′12″N 74°00′39″W	Newburgh	Two-story Colonial Revival post office from early 1930s
174	US Post Office-Port Jervis	US Post Office-Port Jervis	May 11, 1989 (#88002408)	20 Sussex St. 41°22′30″N 74°41′33″W	Port Jervis	Colonial Revival building from the mid-1920s.
175	Mary Van Duzer-Sayer House	Mary Van Duzer-Sayer House	March 8, 1996 (#96000155)	Taylor Rd. 41°24′37″N 74°05′13″W	Cornwall	1832 Federal-style stone farmhouse
176	Village of Monroe Historic District	Village of Monroe Historic District	November 19, 1998 (#98001391)	Roughly bounded by Lake St., Carpenter Place, Clark St., Monroe Race Track Site, Ramapo St., and Oakland Ave. 41°19′28″N 74°11′09″W	Monroe	Early 19th-century residential core of Monroe, mostly spared in 1892 fire. Little new construction since 1940. Contributing properties include birthplace of Velveeta and oldest Masonic lodge in New York.
177	Jacob T. Walden Stone House	Jacob T. Walden Stone House	March 12, 2002 (#02000138)	N. Montgomery St. 41°33′55″N 74°11′44″W	Walden	1730s-built stone house is both oldest in Walden and, later, home to miller the village is named for
178	Walden United Methodist Church	Walden United Methodist Church	February 28, 2008 (#08000103)	125 W. Main St. 41°33′39″N 74°11′32″W	Walden	Intact 1893 brick Victorian Gothic church
179	A. Walsh Stone House and Farm Complex	A. Walsh Stone House and Farm Complex	December 28, 2001 (#01001384)	1570 NY 94; 41°26′27″N 74°06′03″W	Cornwall	Stone Greek Revival house at center of working farm
180	Walsh-Havemeyer House	Walsh-Havemeyer House	March 23, 2010 (#10000101)	10 Plympton St. 41°29′20″N 74°01′05″W	New Windsor	Rare remaining Greek Revival house overlooking Hudson River
181	Daniel Waring House	Daniel Waring House	November 3, 1995 (#95001285)	730 River Rd. 41°31′44″N 74°14′14″W	Montgomery	18th-century home later renovated into only Greek Revival home in Montgomery with columns
182	Warwick Village Historic District	Warwick Village Historic District	September 7, 1984 (#84002886)	Roughly bounded by NY 17A, High, and South Sts., Oakland, Maple, and Colonial Aves. 41°29′46″N 74°21′32″W	Warwick	Core of village of Warwick; buildings date from mid-18th to early 20th century, reflecting changing economy of area
183	Washington's Headquarters	Washington's Headquarters	October 15, 1966 (#66000887)	Liberty and Washington Sts. 41°29′52″N 74°00′39″W	Newburgh	Oldest house in city of Newburgh was home to Washington during Continental Army encampment; later became first property in U.S. acquired by a state government for historic preservation purposes.
184	Webb Lane House	Webb Lane House	November 23, 1982 (#82001230)	Webb Lane; 41°22′14″N 73°57′44″W	Highland Falls	
185	George T. Wisner House	George T. Wisner House	June 30, 2005 (#05000634)	145 South St. 41°23′23″N 74°19′29″W	Goshen (village)	Victorian home of successful local businessman
186	Wilford Wood House	Wilford Wood House	August 28, 1998 (#98001118)	58 Pleasant Hill Rd. 41°24′40″N 74°04′25″W	Mountainville	Built ca. 1890 in an early application of the Colonial Revival style. One of the rare farmhouses built in Cornwall during its resort period; now owned by Storm King Art Center.
187	Woodlawn Farm	Woodlawn Farm	April 11, 2008 (#08000277)	20 Mount Orange Rd. 41°23′36″N 74°28′34″W	Slate Hill	Farm complex with oldest building component dating to 1790; oldest house in Slate Hill
188	Woodruff House	Woodruff House	March 8, 1996 (#96000156)	NY 32; 41°26′56″N 74°03′29″W	Cornwall	Rare remaining 19th-century stone house in Cornwall
189	Wyant-Talbot House	Wyant-Talbot House	March 8, 1996 (#96000151)	42 Clark Ave. 41°26′38″N 74°01′41″W	Cornwall-on-Hudson	
190	Yelverton Inn and Store	Yelverton Inn and Store	March 28, 1980 (#80002733)	112-116 Main St. 41°21′22″N 74°16′41″W	Chester	Wooden 1765 inn entertained Alexander Hamilton and Aaron Burr during local land dispute, in addition to George Washington during Revolution; 1841 store is rare surviving Greek Revival commercial building in area.

== See also ==
- National Register of Historic Places listings in New York
