= Moses Mould House =

Historic house in New York, United States

- U.S. National Register of Historic Places
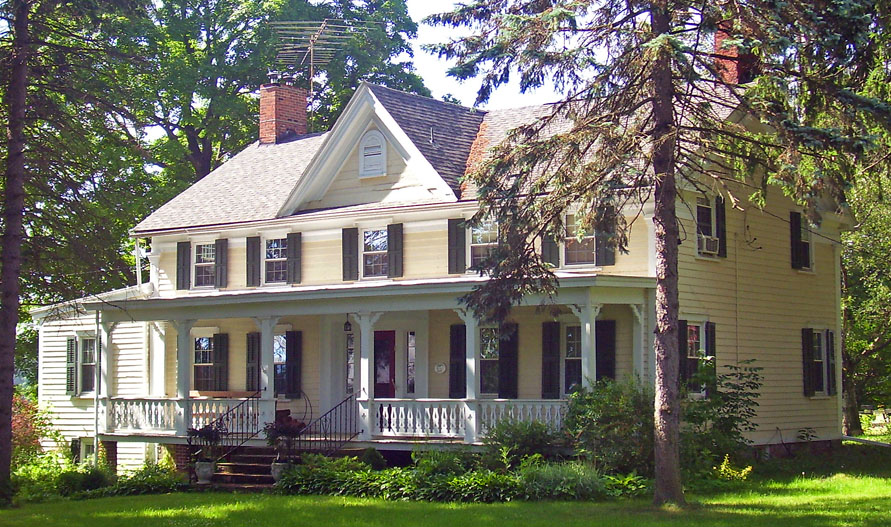
- The house in 2007

- Location within New York Location within the United States
- Location: 1743 NY 17K, Town of Montgomery, NY
- Nearest city: Newburgh
- Coordinates: 41°34′44″N 74°16′01″W
- Area: 6 acres (2.4 ha)
- Built: c. 1850
- Architectural style: Greek Revival
- NRHP reference No.: 02000876
- Added to NRHP: August 22, 2002

The Moses Mould House is a Registered Historic Place located at the junction of NY 17K and Kaistertown Road in the Town of Montgomery, in Orange County, New York. It is just up Kaisertown from another site on the National Register, the Jacob Shafer House. Mould was the first of a large family of German settlers in the town to bear the name. The house was built in a Greek Revival style.

It was added to the National Register of Historic Places in 2002.

== See also ==
- National Register of Historic Places listings in Orange County, New York
