= Benjamin Haines House =

Historic house in New York, United States

- U.S. National Register of Historic Places
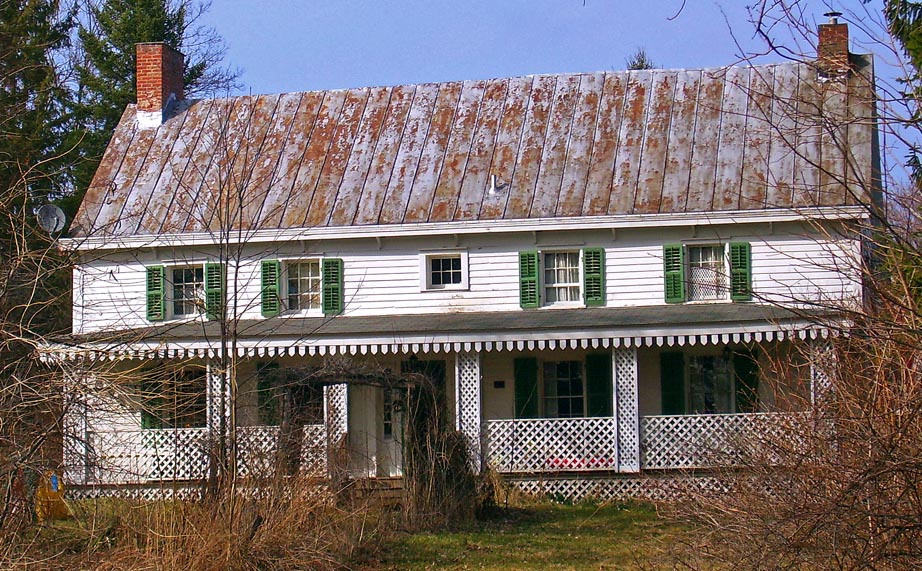
- The Haines house in 2007

- Location within New York Location within the United States
- Location: 114 Coleman Rd., Town of Montgomery, NY
- Nearest city: Newburgh
- Coordinates: 41°32′4″N 74°11′4″W
- Area: 5 acres (2.0 ha)
- Built: c. 1750
- Architectural style: Greek Revival
- NRHP reference No.: 96000560
- Added to NRHP: June 3, 1996

The Benjamin Haines House, also known as the Haines Farmstead and the Haddon-Scott House, is one of the oldest buildings in the Town of Montgomery in Orange County, New York, United States. It is located at 114 Coleman Road southeast of the village of Walden.

Built by Haines around 1750, the house later passed into the ownership of the Haddon and then Scott families. Members of the latter owned it until 1994. Improvements and renovations in the early 19th century gave it a Greek Revival look.

It has been on the National Register of Historic Places since 1996.

== See also ==
- National Register of Historic Places listings in Orange County, New York
