= District School No. 9 =

- U.S. National Register of Historic Places
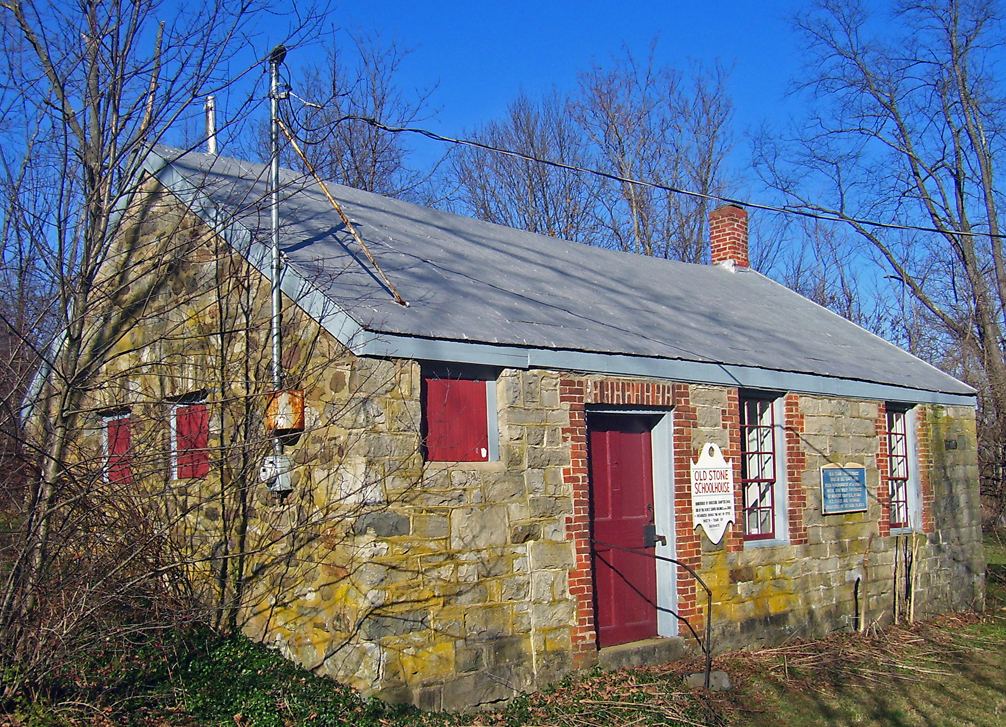
- The schoolhouse in 2006

- Location within New York Location within the United States
- Location: NY 17A, Goshen, NY
- Nearest city: Middletown
- Coordinates: 41°22′23″N 74°21′02″W
- Area: 0.5 acres (0.20 ha)
- Built: 18th century, 1820
- NRHP reference No.: 88001451
- Added to NRHP: September 15, 1988

District School No. 9, sometimes referred to as the Old Stone Schoolhouse, is located on NY 17A 1.4 mile (2.3 km) south of Goshen, New York, United States. One of the first schools in the county, it remained in use for well over a century, possibly two. It is believed to be both the oldest and longest-used one-room schoolhouse in the United States.

Its year of construction is not known. It falls sometime between 1723, when a local landowner deeded the surrounding 20 acres (8 ha) to the community for school purposes; and 1792, when the Goshen Repository carried an advertisement for a teacher for the school.

Legend has it that, during the Revolutionary War, George Washington was riding by on a trip from nearby Florida to his headquarters at Newburgh, and stopped briefly at the school to talk to the children. William Henry Seward, later United States Secretary of State, walked the three miles (5 km) here from the village of Florida to the south for afternoon classes when he was growing up.

Long referred to as the Borden Quarry School for a nearby excavation site, it was in use continuously until 1938. Fifty years later it was added to the National Register of Historic Places. It is maintained today by the Minisink Chapter of the Daughters of the American Revolution (DAR), which met there for a while, but only in the summers because the building had no heat or water.

In the early 21st century the building developed some issues. The DAR could not afford to maintain it, and by 2010 the roof was in danger of collapsing, with only a blue tarp protecting the interior. The chapter worked with Orange-Ulster BOCES, whose main facility is nearby, to repair it, with DAR buying $5,000 worth of materials and BOCES providing labor. After that, a historic preservationist discovered that the building's pine flooring was sitting directly on the underlying dirt, creating a serious drainage issue. A combination of grants and donations raised the $40,000 necessary to remedy that problem.

== Gallery ==
Interior

The schoolhouse from the rear

Historic marker

== See also ==
- National Register of Historic Places listings in Orange County, New York
