= Union Chapel (Cornwall-on-Hudson, New York) =

- U.S. National Register of Historic Places
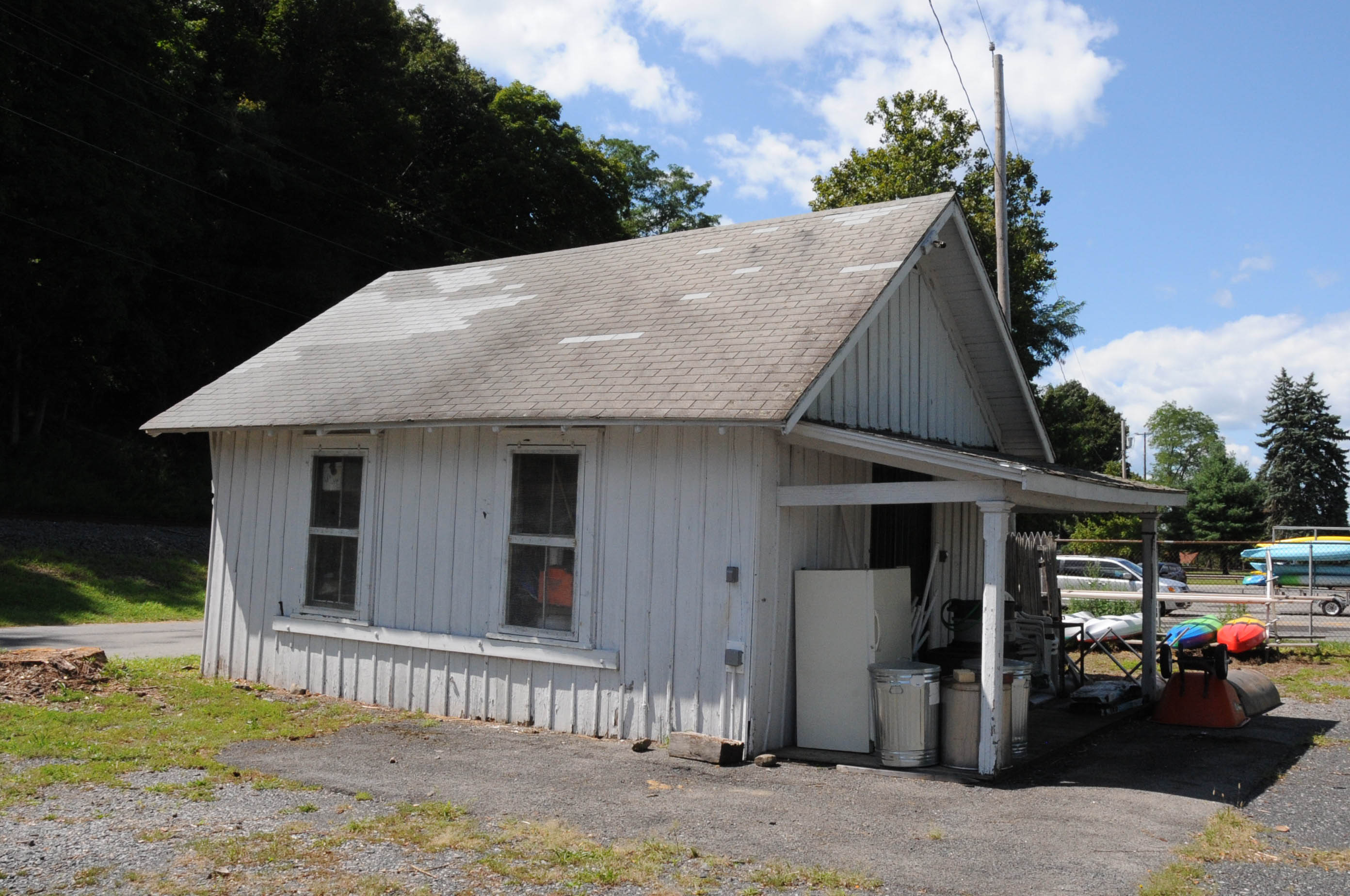
- Union Chapel, August 2018

- Location within New York Location within the United States
- Location: Shore Rd., Cornwall-on-Hudson, New York
- Coordinates: 41°26′36″N 73°59′58″W
- Area: less than one acre
- Built: 1873
- Architectural style: Italianate, Picturesque
- NRHP reference No.: 12000958
- Added to NRHP: November 21, 2012

Union Chapel, also known as Cornwall Landing Quaker Chapel, is a historic Quaker chapel located in Cornwall-on-Hudson, New York. It was built about 1873, and is an 18-by-22-foot (5.5 by 6.7 m), wood frame building with board-and-batten siding in a vernacular Italianate style. It was erected by Cornwall’s Orthodox Quakers to facilitate the extension of religion to the residents of Cornwall Landing. Its last documented use as a facility for religious services was in 1914.

It was listed on the National Register of Historic Places in 2012.
