= Shorter House (Crawford, New York) =

Historic house in New York, United States

- U.S. National Register of Historic Places
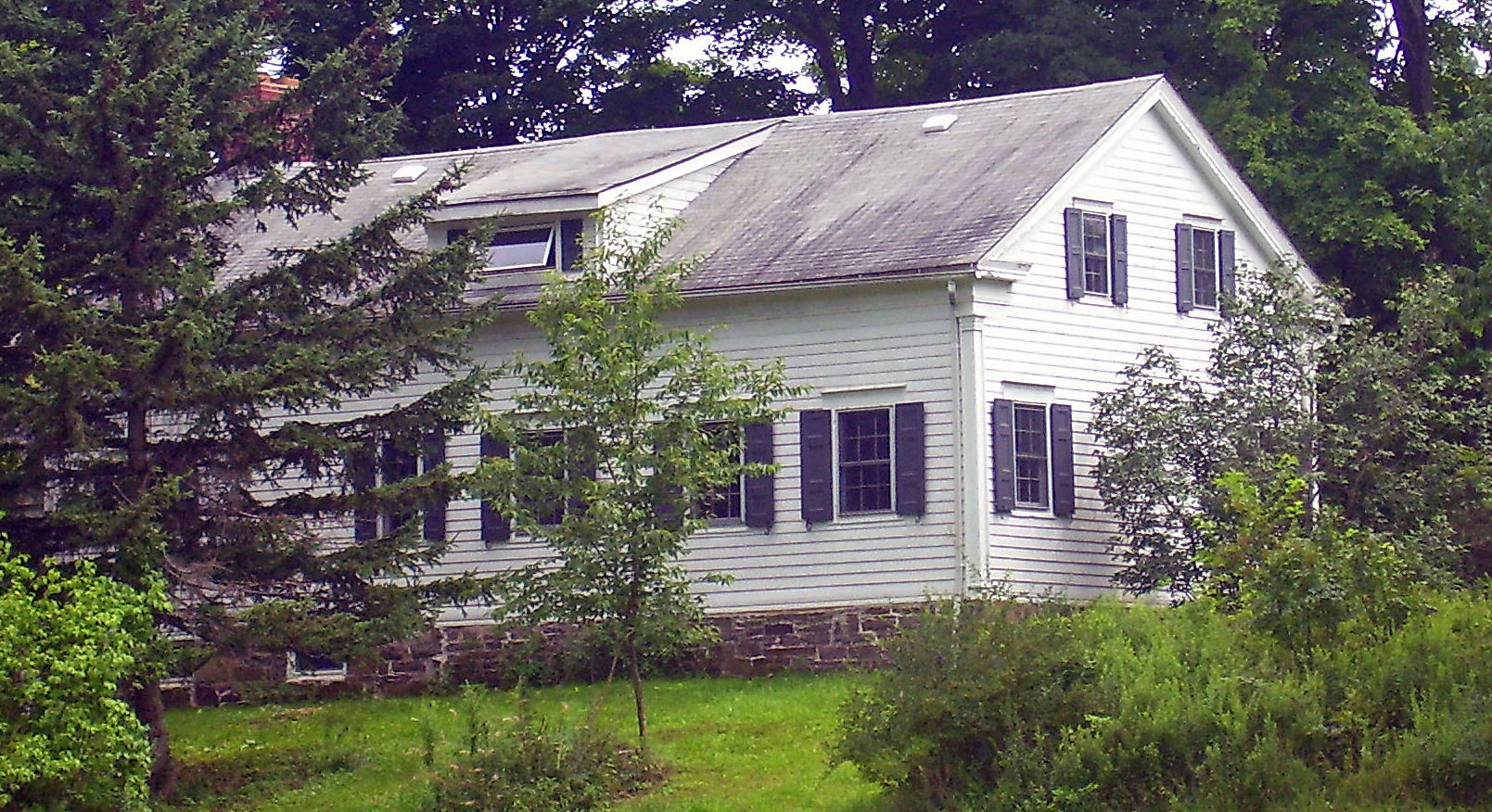
- House in 2007

- Location within New York Location within the United States
- Location: Andrews Rd., Thompson Ridge, NY
- Nearest city: Middletown
- Coordinates: 41°34′18″N 74°20′45″W
- Area: 2.7 acres (1.1 ha)
- Architectural style: Greek Revival
- NRHP reference No.: 98001004
- Added to NRHP: August 24, 1998

The Shorter House is located at the end of Andrews Road in Thompson Ridge, a hamlet in the Town of Crawford in Orange County, New York, United States. It is a late 18th-century building later modified in the Greek Revival style.

It was added to the National Register of Historic Places in 1998.
