= Tweddle Farmstead =

Historic house in New York, United States

- U.S. National Register of Historic Places
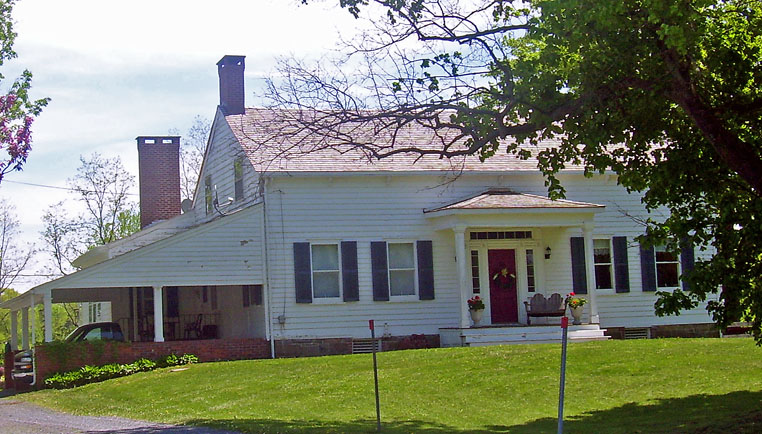
- The house in 2007

- Location within New York Location within the United States
- Location: 263 Beaver Dam Rd., Town of Montgomery, NY
- Nearest city: Newburgh
- Coordinates: 41°30′21″N 74°14′02″W
- Area: 167 acres (68 ha)
- Built: 1800
- Architectural style: Greek Revival
- NRHP reference No.: 99001134
- Added to NRHP: September 9, 1999

The Tweddle Farmstead is a Registered Historic Place located on Beaverdam Road in the Town of Montgomery in Orange County, New York. Built in the early 19th century by Bercoon van Alst, it was added to significantly in the 1830s in the Greek Revival style. This gave the house its current front. Thomas Tweddle bought the house in 1868, and it has remained in his family since.

It was added to the National Register of Historic Places in 1999.
