= Patrick Piggot House =

Historic house in New York, United States

- U.S. National Register of Historic Places
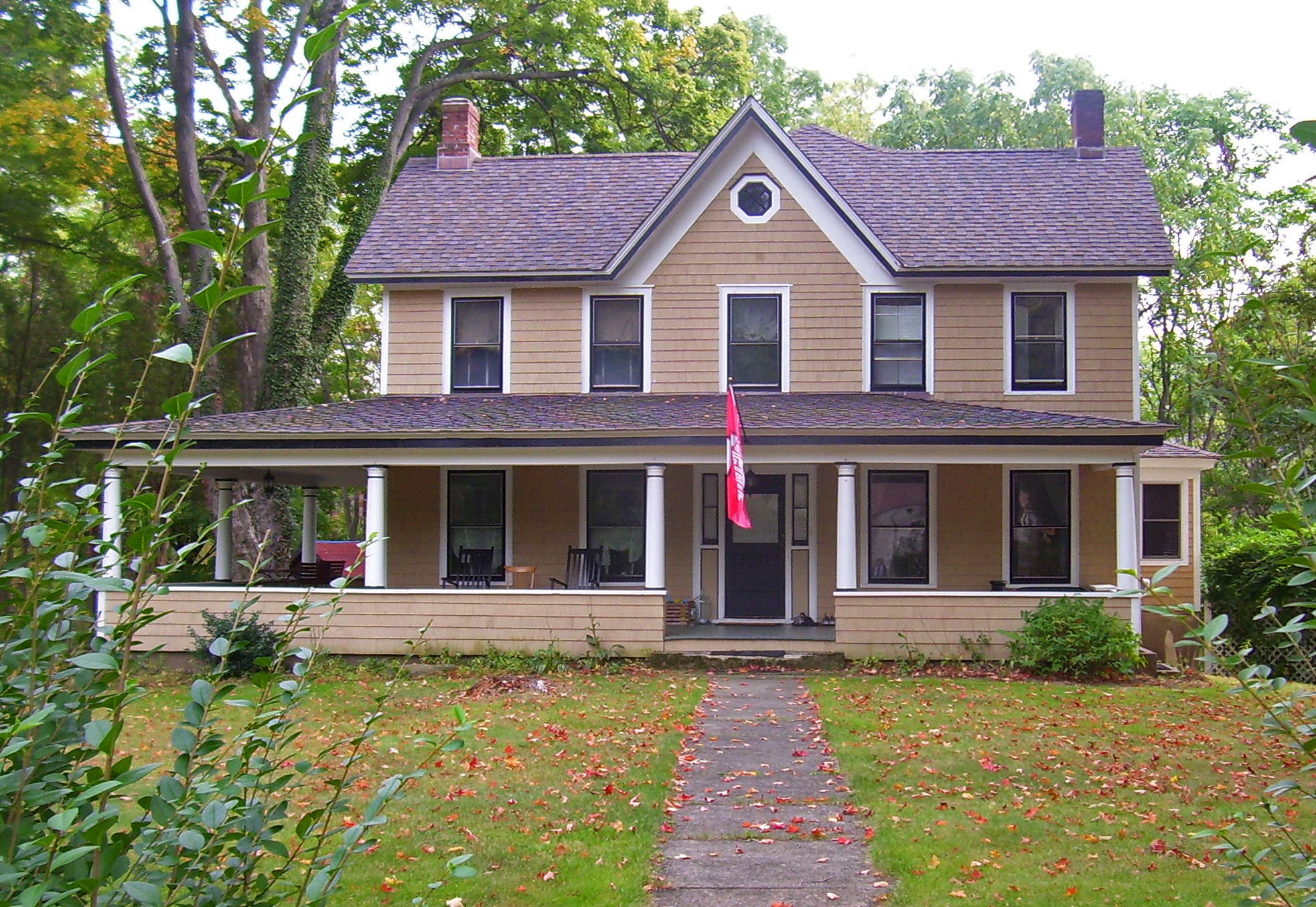
- House in 2007
- Location: Cornwall, New York
- Nearest city: Newburgh
- Coordinates: 41°25′40″N 74°02′30″W
- Built: 1869
- Architectural style: Queen Anne
- NRHP reference No.: 98001115
- Added to NRHP: 1998

The Patrick Piggot House, also known as Angola Lodge, is located on Angola Road just east of US 9W in Cornwall, New York, United States. It has gone from being a farmhouse to a summer boardinghouse back to a private dwelling once again.

Piggot and his wife Ellen bought the property from local landowner Henry Chedeayne in 1869. That summer they contracted with Mead and Taft to build a farmhouse. They designed a simple Queen Anne home, less ornate than the Cornwall house that later became popular novelist Amelia Barr's Cherry Croft summer home. It had two storeys and a cross-gabled roof.

They and their seven children worked on the family farm until 1910, when the Chedeayne estate foreclosed on them after they failed to pay their mortgage. In 1916 it was sold to a Miriam Williams, who renovated and modified it slightly and then in turn sold it to Max Meyers. He found the house perfect for adaptation into a summer boardinghouse. The wide floors offered enough space for guest rooms and their symmetrical windows encouraged light breezes through the house. Downtown Cornwall and the Hudson Highlands were located short walks away.

Angola Lodge peaked in the 1930s and '40s, after which vacationers began preferring shorter vacations located further away. Eventually it was sold and restored to its original use. The original windows and many of the original interior remains. It was added to the National Register of Historic Places in 1998.
