= Sawyer Farmhouse =

Historic house in New York, United States

- U.S. National Register of Historic Places
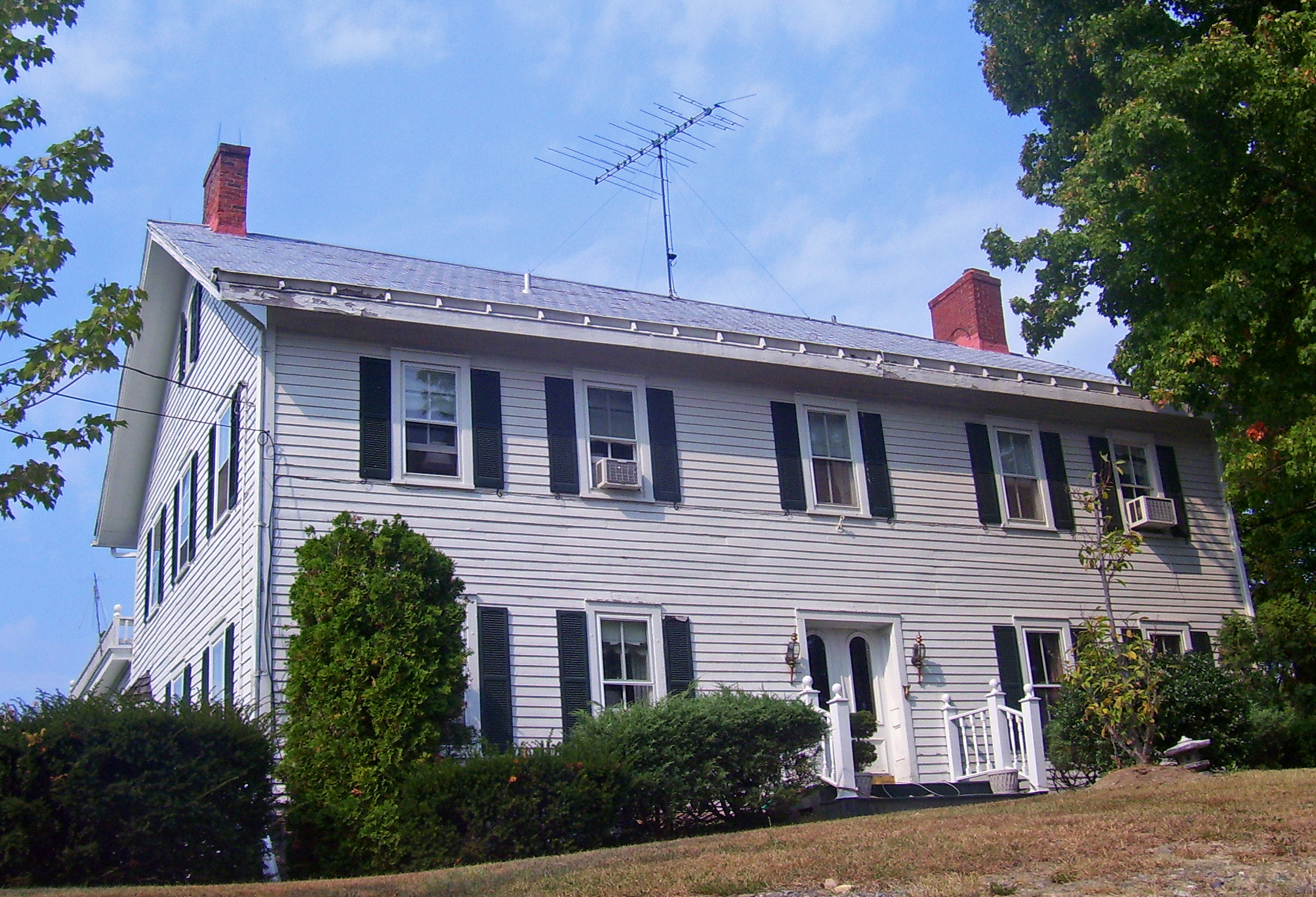
- Front view of house in 2007

- Location within New York Location within the United States
- Location: 178 Maple Ave., Town of Goshen, NY
- Nearest city: Middletown
- Coordinates: 41°22′29″N 74°22′44″W
- Area: 1.9 acres (0.77 ha)
- Built: c. 1780, c. 1810, c. 1860, c. 1890
- Architectural style: Federal, Italianate
- NRHP reference No.: 05000636
- Added to NRHP: June 30, 2005

The Sawyer Farmhouse is the residence of the family of the same name, on Maple Avenue in the Town of Goshen, New York, United States, at the edge of the Black Dirt Region. It was built about 1780, and is a two-story, five-bay, Federal style frame dwelling updated about 1860 in a picturesque Italianate style. An initial addition was built about 1810, and a one-story rear addition was added about 1890.

It was added to the National Register of Historic Places in 2005.
