= Dock Hill Road Extension Stone Arch Bridge =

- U.S. National Register of Historic Places
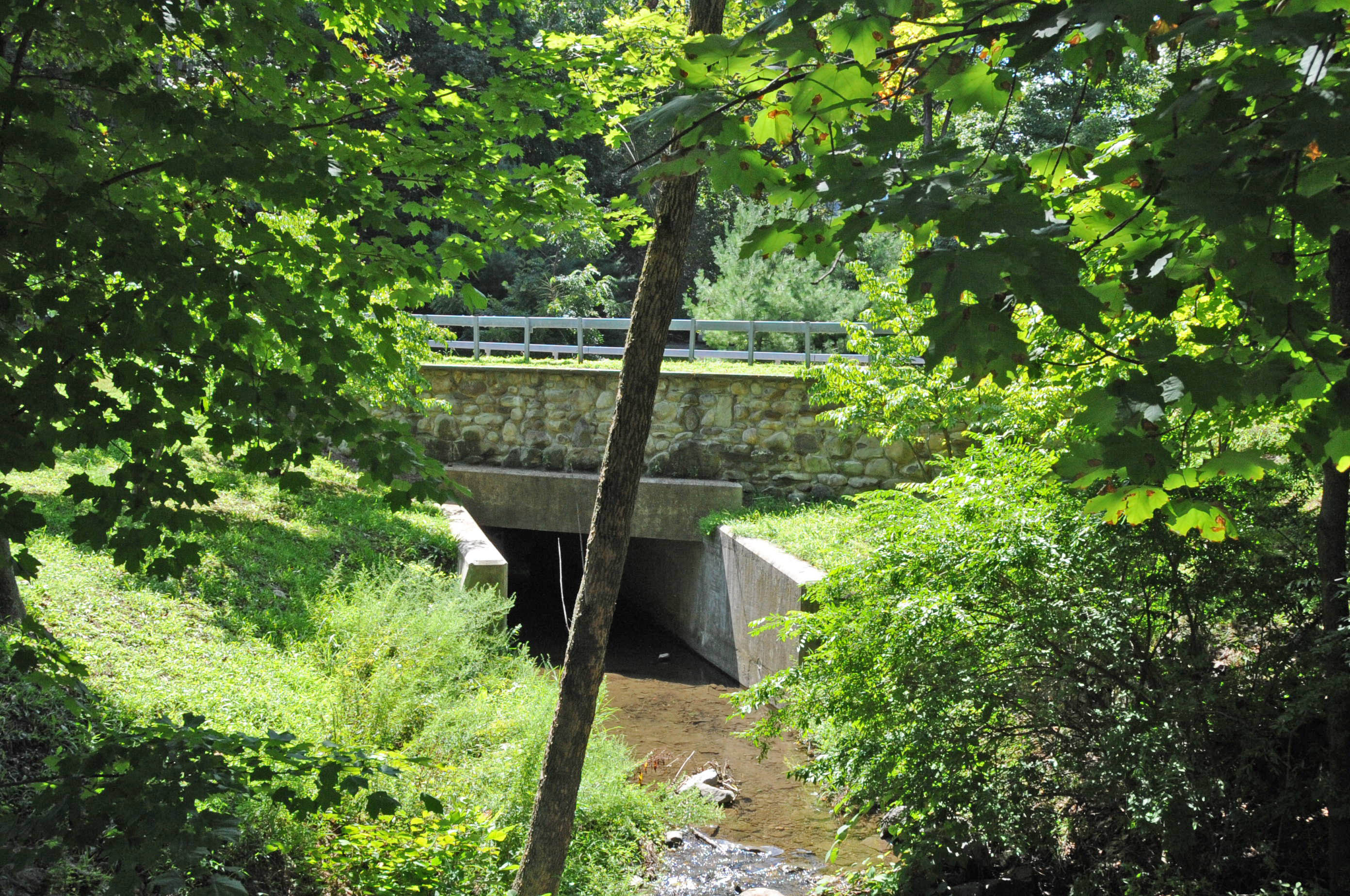

- Location within New York Location within the United States
- Location: Dock Hill Rd. Extension, Cornwall on Hudson, New York
- Coordinates: 41°26′34″N 74°0′25″W
- Area: 0.9 acres (0.36 ha)
- Built: 1870
- NRHP reference No.: 09001230
- Added to NRHP: January 13, 2010

Dock Hill Road Extension Stone Arch Bridge is a historic stone arch bridge located at Cornwall on Hudson in Orange County, New York. It was built about 1870.

It was listed on the National Register of Historic Places in 2010.
