= Gideon Pelton Farm =

Historic house in New York, United States

- U.S. National Register of Historic Places
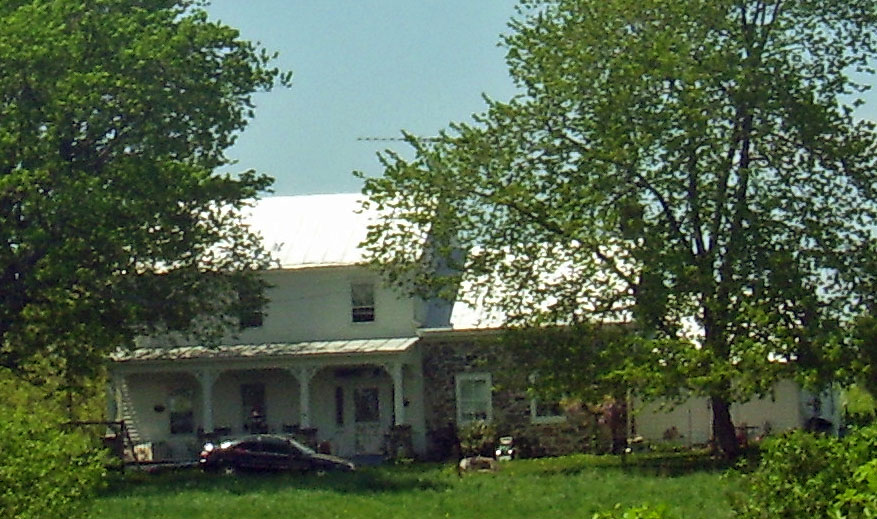
- The farm from its driveway in 2007

- Location within New York Location within the United States
- Location: 250 Rockefellow Ln., Town of Montgomery, NY
- Nearest city: Newburgh
- Coordinates: 41°30′16″N 74°14′30″W
- Area: 96 acres (39 ha)
- Built: c. 1770
- Architectural style: Greek Revival, Palatine Settlement
- NRHP reference No.: 95001287
- Added to NRHP: November 3, 1995

The Gideon Pelton Farm is a Registered Historic Place located on Rockafellow Lane in the Town of Montgomery in Orange County, New York. Pelton settled the area in the 1770s and built the house soon afterwards. A stone wing was built on it before the end of the century, and in the 1830s a large frame section was added in the then-popular Greek Revival style that gave the house its current character. It continues to be used as a farmhouse to this day.

It was added to the National Register of Historic Places in 1995.
