= Everett-Bradner House =

Historic house in New York, United States

- U.S. National Register of Historic Places
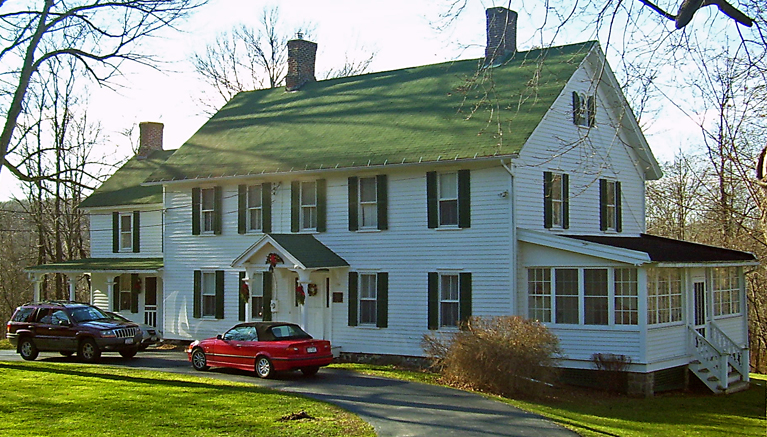
- The house in late 2006

- Location within New York Location within the United States
- Location: Goshen, NY
- Nearest city: Middletown
- Coordinates: 41°23′22″N 74°19′34″W
- Area: 1.6 acres (0.65 ha)
- Built: c. 1750
- Architectural style: Georgian, Picturesque
- NRHP reference No.: 04001204
- Added to NRHP: October 27, 2004

The Everett-Bradner House, also known as the Bradner-Young House, is located at 156 South Street in the village of Goshen, New York. It has been a Registered Historic Place since 2004.

The listing included "the house, a brick smokehouse, a small frame barn, and a well and hand pump. The property also contains a larger barn complex that [was, in 2004] unfortunately in an advanced state of dereliction and is in the process of collapsing."
