= George T. Wisner House =

Historic house in New York, United States

- U.S. National Register of Historic Places
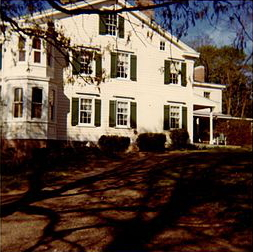
- George T. Wisner House, July 2004

- Location within New York Location within the United States
- Location: Goshen, NY
- Nearest city: Middletown
- Coordinates: 41°23′45″N 74°19′21″W
- Area: 4 acres (1.6 ha)
- Built: c. 1805, c. 1840
- Architectural style: Federal, Greek Revival
- NRHP reference No.: 05000634
- Added to NRHP: June 30, 2005

The George T. Wisner House, also known as Oak Hill, is a historic home located on South Street in Goshen, New York, United States. It was built about 1840, and is a Greek Revival style frame dwelling that incorporates an earlier Federal style dwelling built about 1805. It has a broad gabled roof and a central hall plan interior. The front section is 2 1/2 stories, five bays wide and four bays deep.

It was added to the National Register of Historic Places in 2005.
