= Denniston–Steidle House =

Historic house in New York, United States

- U.S. National Register of Historic Places
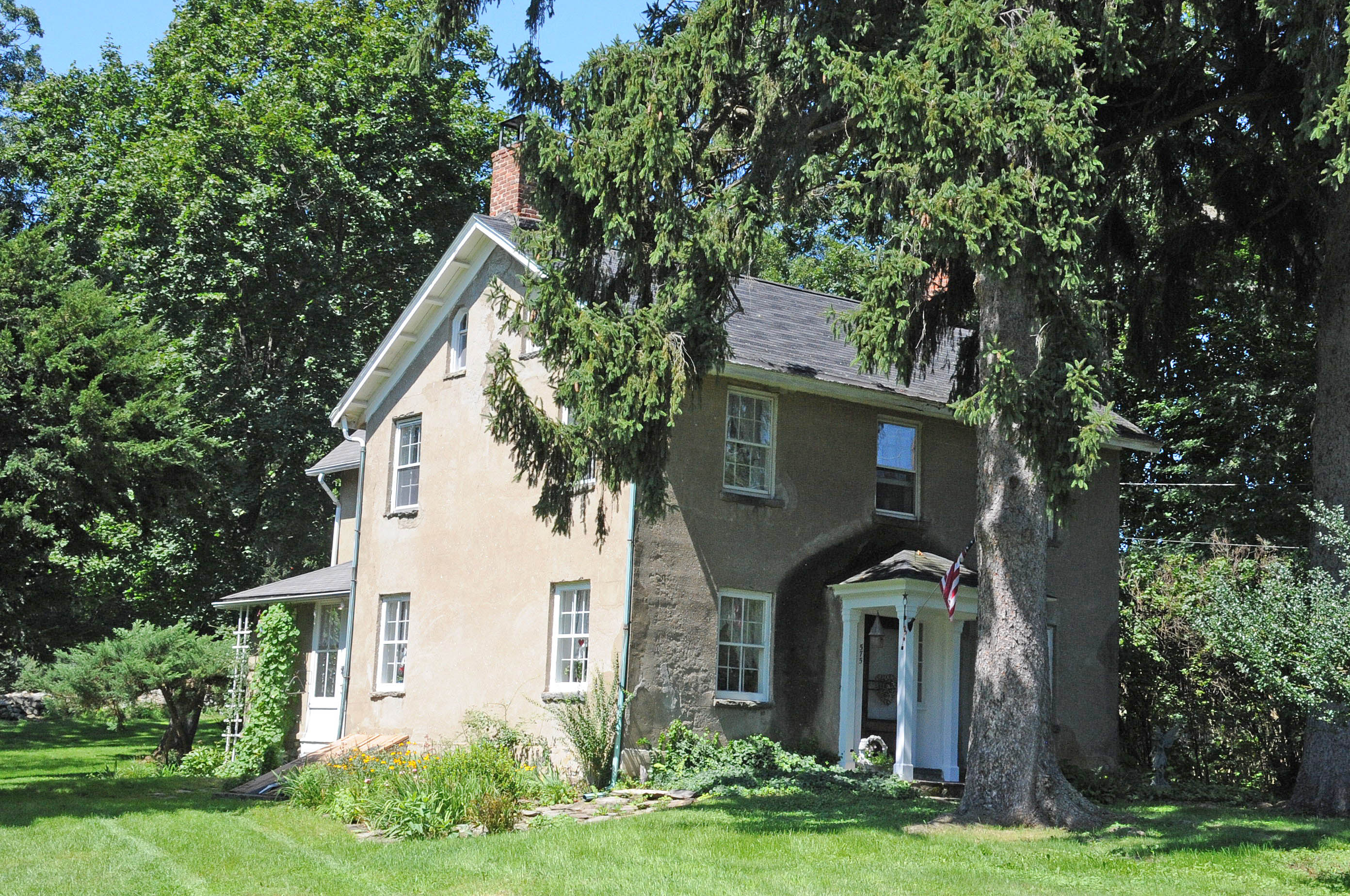

- Location within New York Location within the United States
- Location: 575 Jackson Ave., New Windsor, New York
- Coordinates: 41°27′43″N 74°06′23″W
- Area: 25.8 acres (10.4 ha)
- Built: c. 1875, 1915
- Architectural style: Italianate
- NRHP reference No.: 12000257
- Added to NRHP: May 8, 2012

Denniston–Steidle House also known as Pineview Farm and the Steidle Farm is a historic home located at New Windsor in Orange County, New York. It was built about 1875, with a rear ell added in 1915. It consists of a two-story, three-bay, Italianate style main block with a 1 1/2-story rear ell. The farmhouse is a rare example of non-reinforced lime-based concrete construction in the region; the ell is of terra cotta block construction. Also on the property are the contributing timber frame banked carriage house (c. 1875), terra cotta block wellhouse (c. 1915), and a frame outhouse (c. 1915).

It was listed on the National Register of Historic Places in 2012.
