= Adams–Chadeayne–Taft Estate =

Historic house in New York, United States

- U.S. National Register of Historic Places
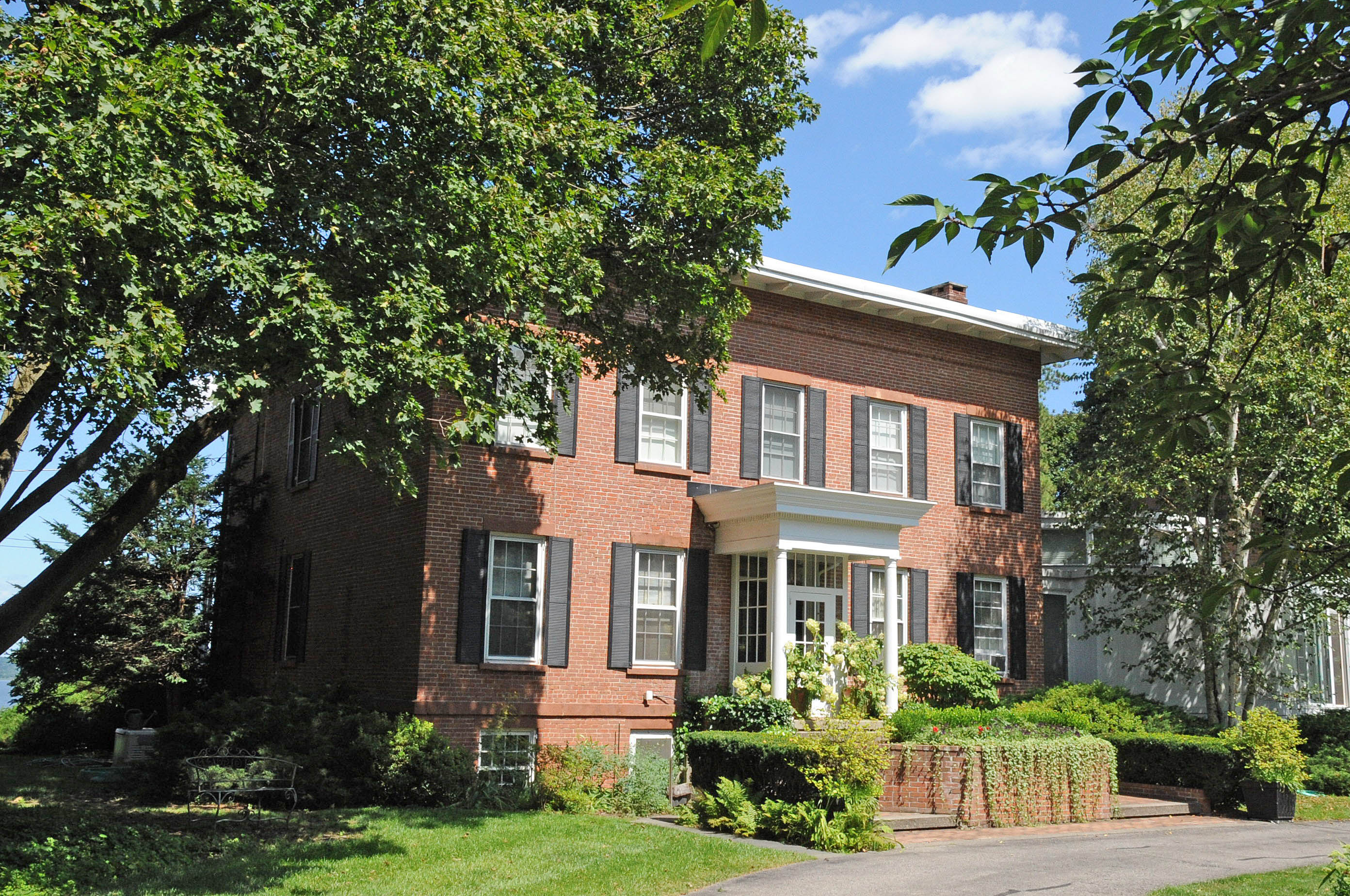
- Nathaniel Adams House

- Location within New York Location within the United States
- Location: 1–2 Riverbank Lane, Cornwall-on-Hudson, New York
- Coordinates: 41°26′47″N 74°00′59″W
- Area: 10.41 acres (4.21 ha)
- Built: c. 1800-1875
- Architectural style: Federal, Greek Revival, Italianate
- NRHP reference No.: 13000932
- Added to NRHP: December 27, 2013

The Adams–Chadeayne–Taft Estate is a set of two historic homes and a pottery works ruin located at Cornwall-on-Hudson in Orange County, New York. It includes the Nathaniel Adams House (c. 1844), Clark-King House (c. 1800–1850), and site of the Clark Stoneware Works (c. 1793–1840). The Nathaniel Adams House is a 2 1/2-story, square plan, brick dwelling topped by a low hipped roof. The interior features extensive Trompe-l'œil. The Clark-King House consists of a three-story main block flanked by lower two-story wings. The interior features Federal style woodwork. Associated with the Clark-King House are the contributing cistern and cast iron gateposts. The ruins of the Clark Stoneware Works include a section of a stone wall and the remains of a brick kiln.

It was listed on the National Register of Historic Places on December 27, 2013.

On the site of the Adams House formerly stood the homestead of Peter Roe, considered the first abolitionist in Orange County. He was the father of the novelist Edward Payson Roe.

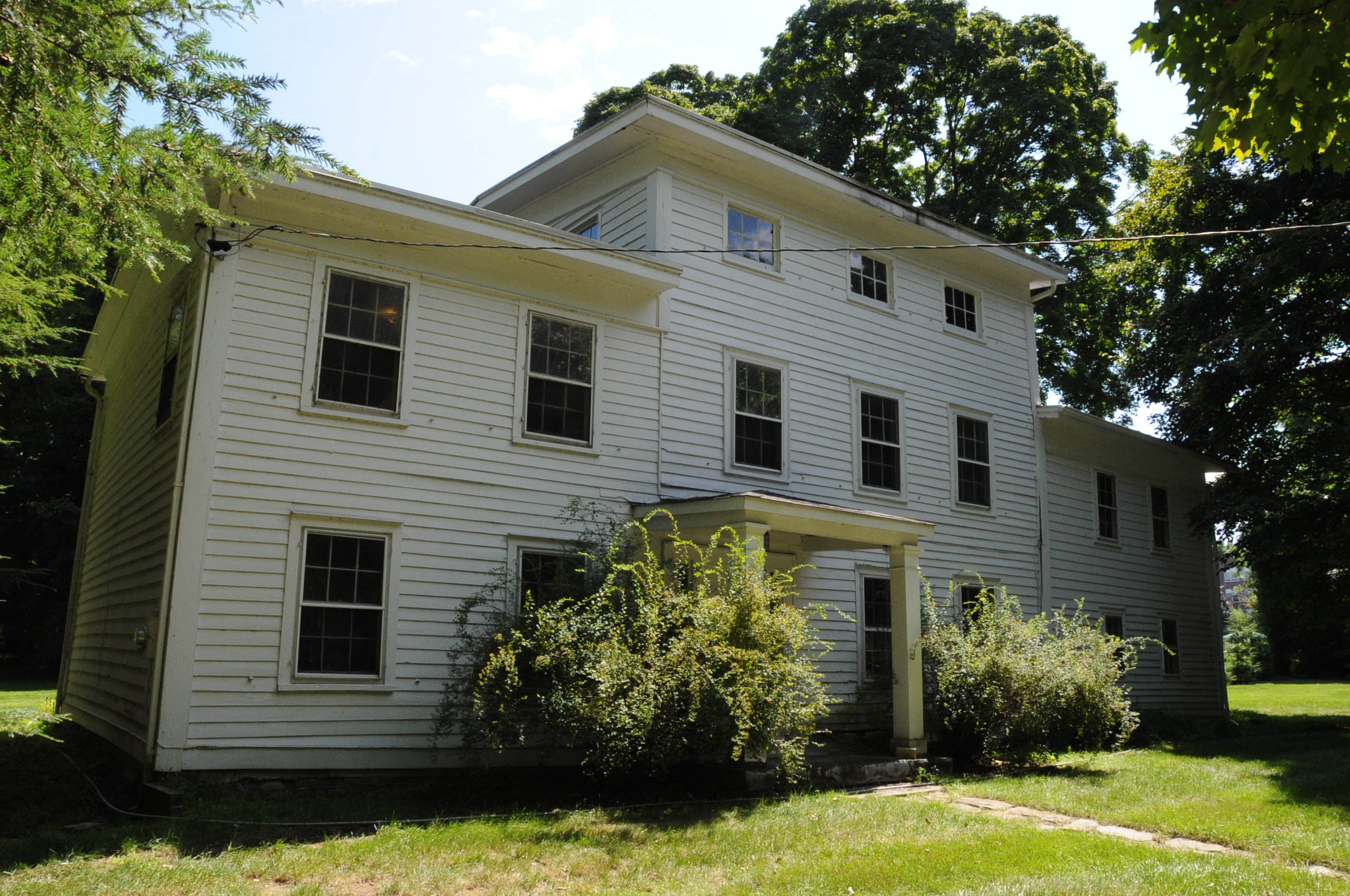
Clark-King House
