= Milliken-Smith Farm =

Historic house in New York, United States

- U.S. National Register of Historic Places
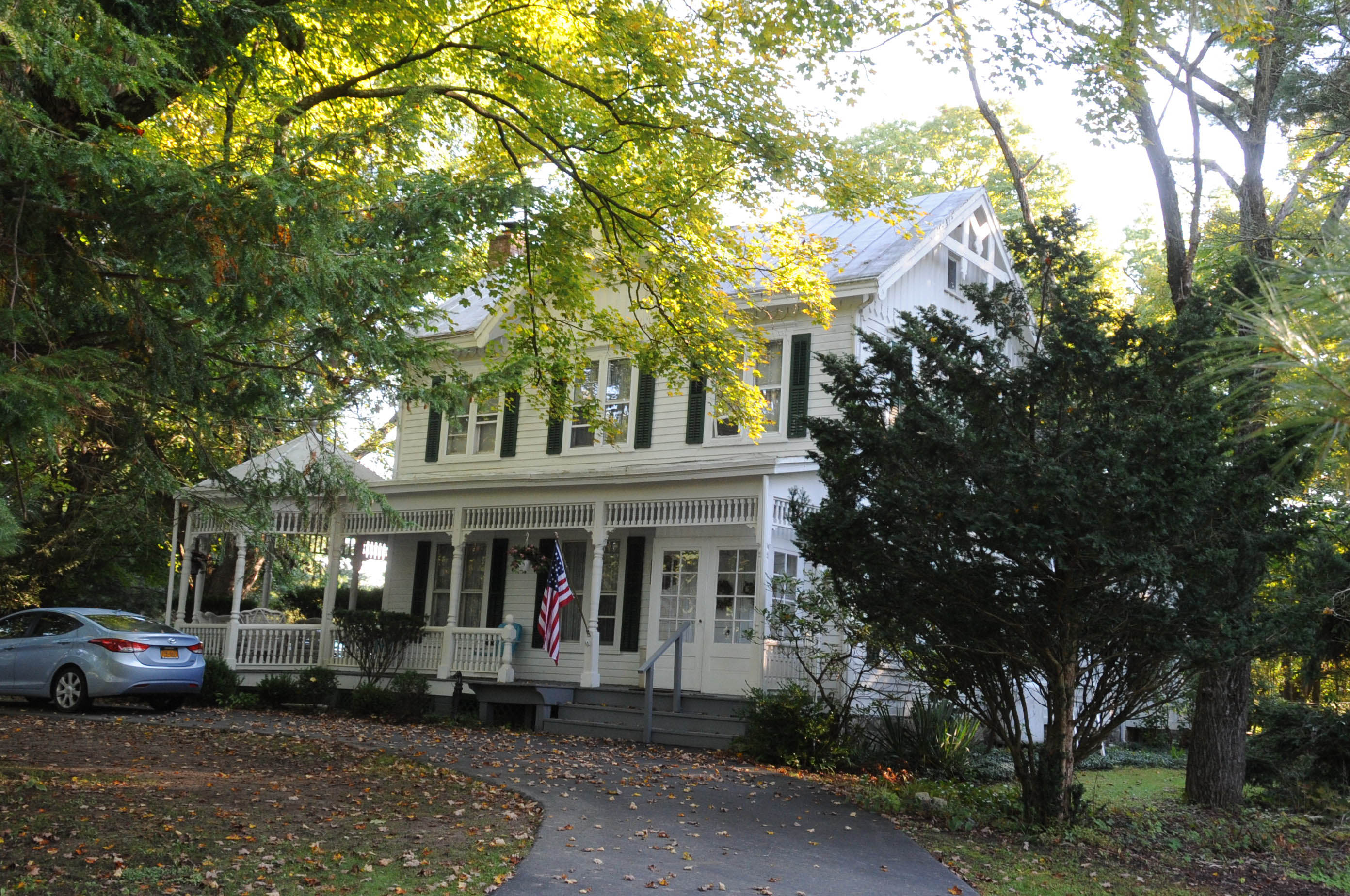

- Location within New York Location within the United States
- Location: 279 Bailey Rd., Montgomery, New York
- Coordinates: 41°32′4″N 74°12′36″W
- Area: 8.6 acres (3.5 ha)
- Built: 1770
- NRHP reference No.: 09000158
- Added to NRHP: March 25, 2009

Milliken-Smith Farm is a historic home and farm complex located at Montgomery in Orange County, New York. Contributing buildings include the Milliken-Smith house (built in 1770 and expanded about 1870), a large timber-frame barn dated to the 18th century, a light frame chicken house (c. 1900), and a banded wood storage silo. The earliest portion of the house is a 1 1/2-story timber-frame building. It was expanded during the 1870s with a 2-story light frame addition. A non-historic addition was completed in 1962.

It was listed on the National Register of Historic Places in 2009.
