= Brown Farmstead =

Historic house in New York, United States

- U.S. National Register of Historic Places
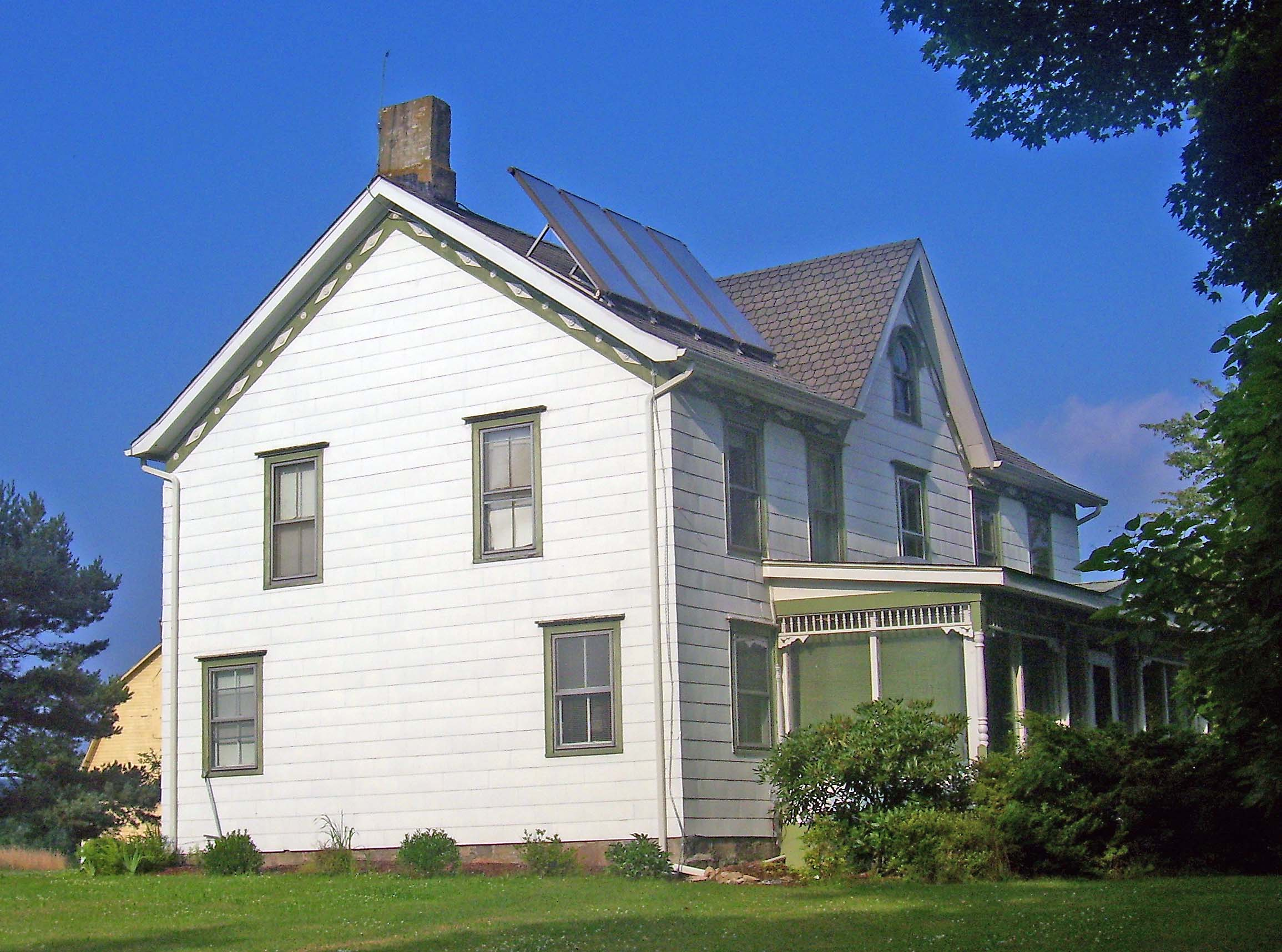
- The house in 2007, with solar panels visible

- Location within New York Location within the United States
- Location: 238 Browns Rd., Town of Montgomery, NY
- Nearest city: Newburgh
- Coordinates: 41°32′02″N 74°08′37″W
- Area: 113.1 acres (45.8 ha)
- Built: c. 1834, 1879
- Architectural style: Greek Revival, Queen Anne, et al.
- NRHP reference No.: 05001383
- Added to NRHP: December 7, 2005

The Brown Farmstead is located on Browns Road in the Town of Montgomery, east of Walden, in Orange County, New York, United States. The farmhouse was built about 1834, and is a two-story, side passage Greek Revival style. It was modified on the interior and exterior in 1879, in the Queen Anne style. Also on the property is a contributing 20th century dairy barn. It is the home of the Browns, who settled that region and gave their name to the road that runs past the house. They obtained this property in 1828.

It was added to the National Register of Historic Places in 2005.
