= Fury Brook Farm =

Historic house in New York, United States

- U.S. National Register of Historic Places
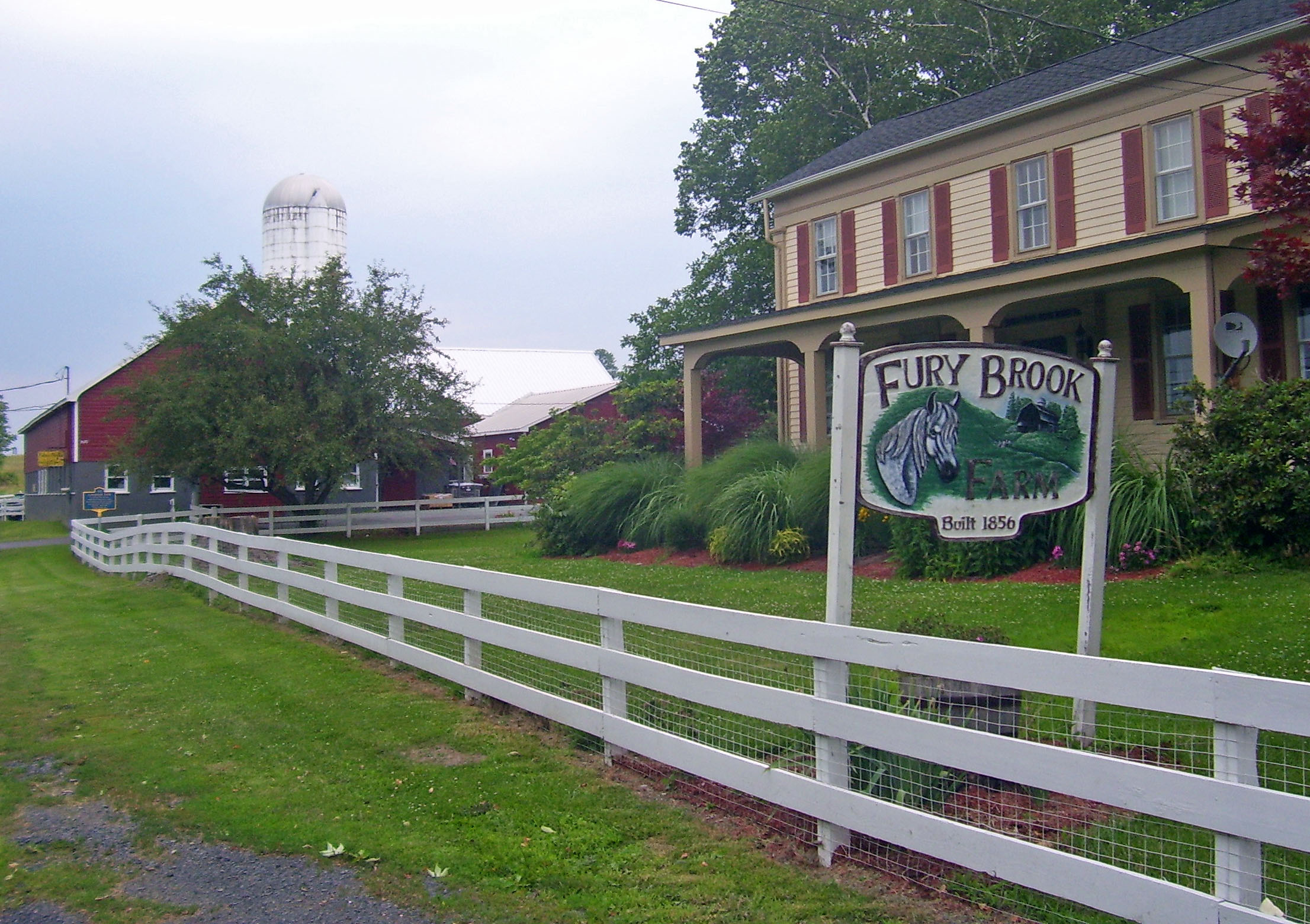
- Farm frontage along King's Highway, 2008
- Location: Sugar Loaf, NY
- Nearest city: Middletown
- Coordinates: 41°19′33″N 74°16′49″W
- Built: 1731
- NRHP reference No.: 04000995
- Added to NRHP: 2004

Fury Brook Farm, also Bairdlea Farm, is located on King's Highway in the Town of Chester, New York, United States, just north of the hamlet of Sugar Loaf. It was listed on the National Register of Historic Places in 2004 to help protect the land around it from development.

It was established in 1731, the first farm on the Wawayanda Path, which King's Highway follows. Several decades later many of the horses used by the Continental Army during the Revolutionary War were bred and raised on its pastures.
