= Dubois-Phelps House =

Historic house in New York, United States

- U.S. National Register of Historic Places
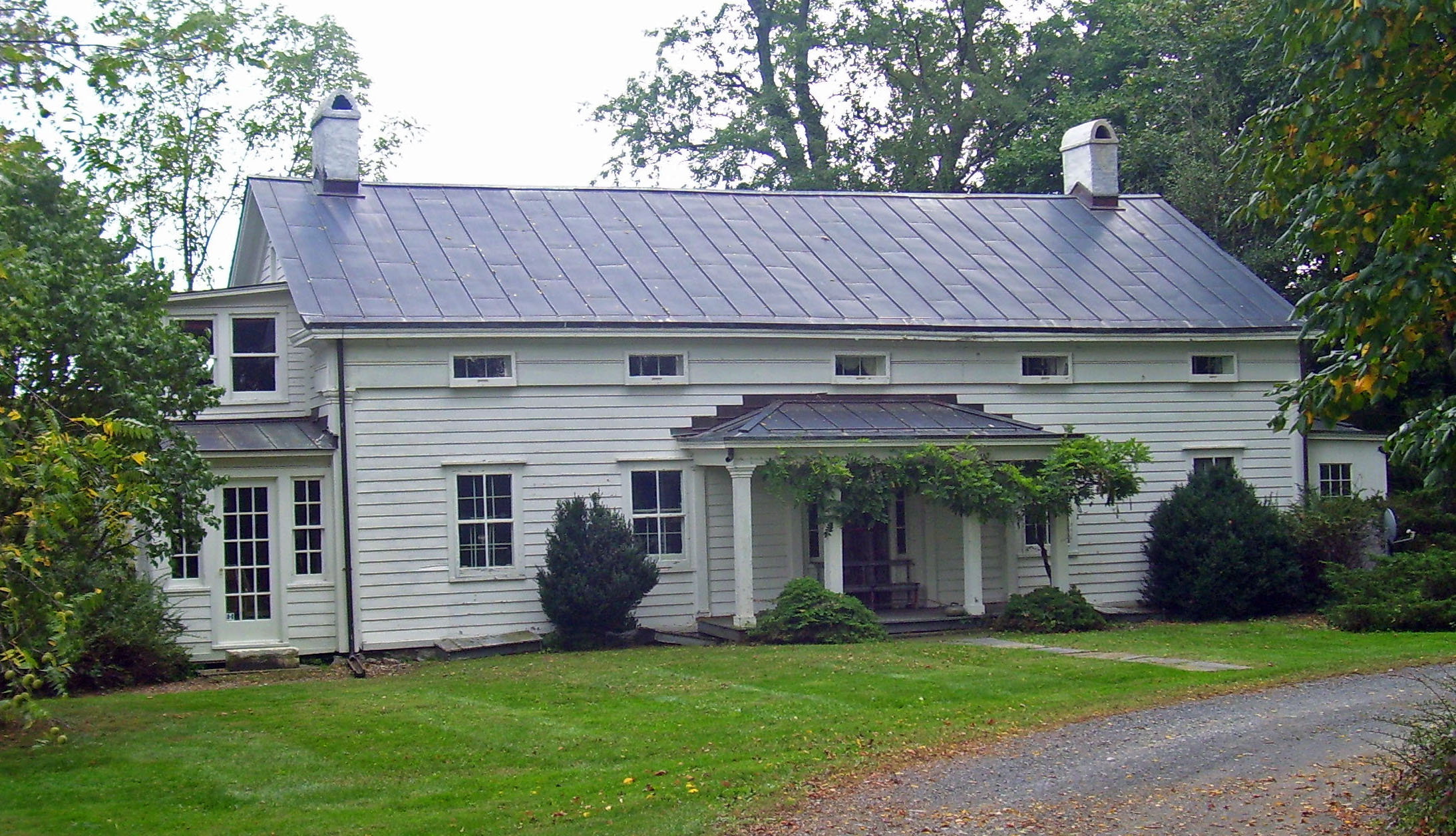

- Location within New York Location within the United States
- Location: 90 Walkill Rd., Town of Montgomery, NY
- Nearest city: Newburgh
- Coordinates: 41°34′40″N 74°11′39″W
- Area: 61.4 acres (24.8 ha)
- Built: 1940
- Architectural style: Mid 19th Century Revival, Greek Revival
- NRHP reference No.: 97000939
- Added to NRHP: August 21, 1997

The Dubois-Phelps House is a farmhouse located off Wallkill Road outside of the village of Walden in the Town of Montgomery, New York, United States. It is in the center of Riverside Farm, close to the Wallkill River.

The original farmhouse was built sometime in the 18th century. In 1851, Nathaniel DuBois bought it and renovated it extensively in the Greek Revival style, creating the building as it exists today. The Phelps family, its current occupant, bought the property from his descendants in 1922.

It was added to the National Register of Historic Places in 1997.
