= A. Walsh Stone House and Farm Complex =

Historic house in New York, United States

- U.S. National Register of Historic Places
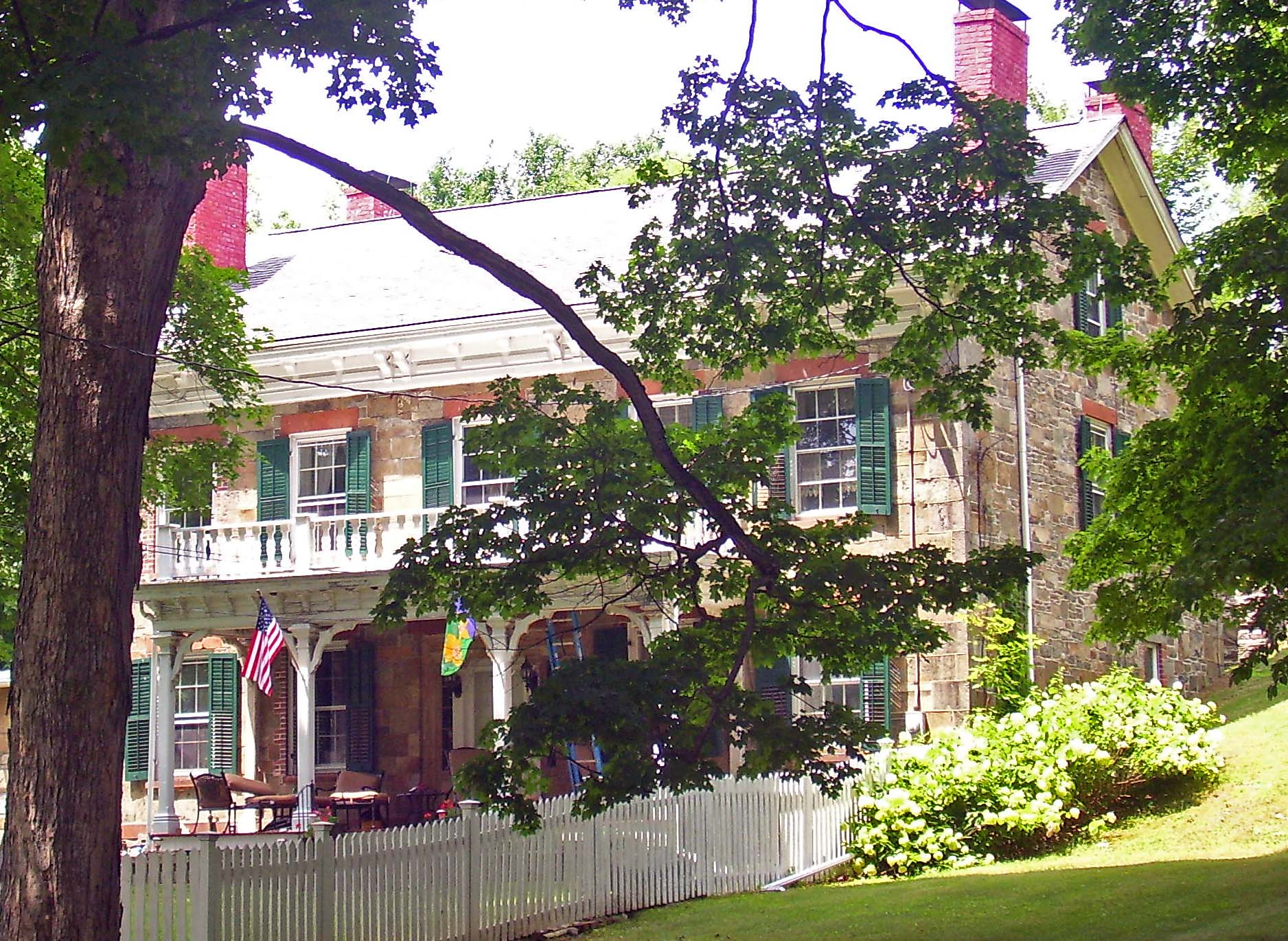
- House in 2007

- Location within New York Location within the United States
- Location: 1570 NY 94, Cornwall, New York
- Nearest city: Newburgh
- Coordinates: 41°26′13″N 74°05′59″W
- Area: 51 acres (21 ha)
- Built: 1842
- Architectural style: Greek Revival
- MPS: Cornwall MPS
- NRHP reference No.: 01001384
- Added to NRHP: December 28, 2001

The A. Walsh Stone House and Farm Complex is located along NY 94 in the Orange County town of Cornwall, New York, United States. It is next to the Salisbury Mills Metro-North station and not far from the Moodna Viaduct. The center of the complex, still a working farm, is a stone Greek Revival house.

It was added to the National Register of Historic Places in 2001.
