= Upland Lawn =

Historic house in New York, United States

- U.S. National Register of Historic Places
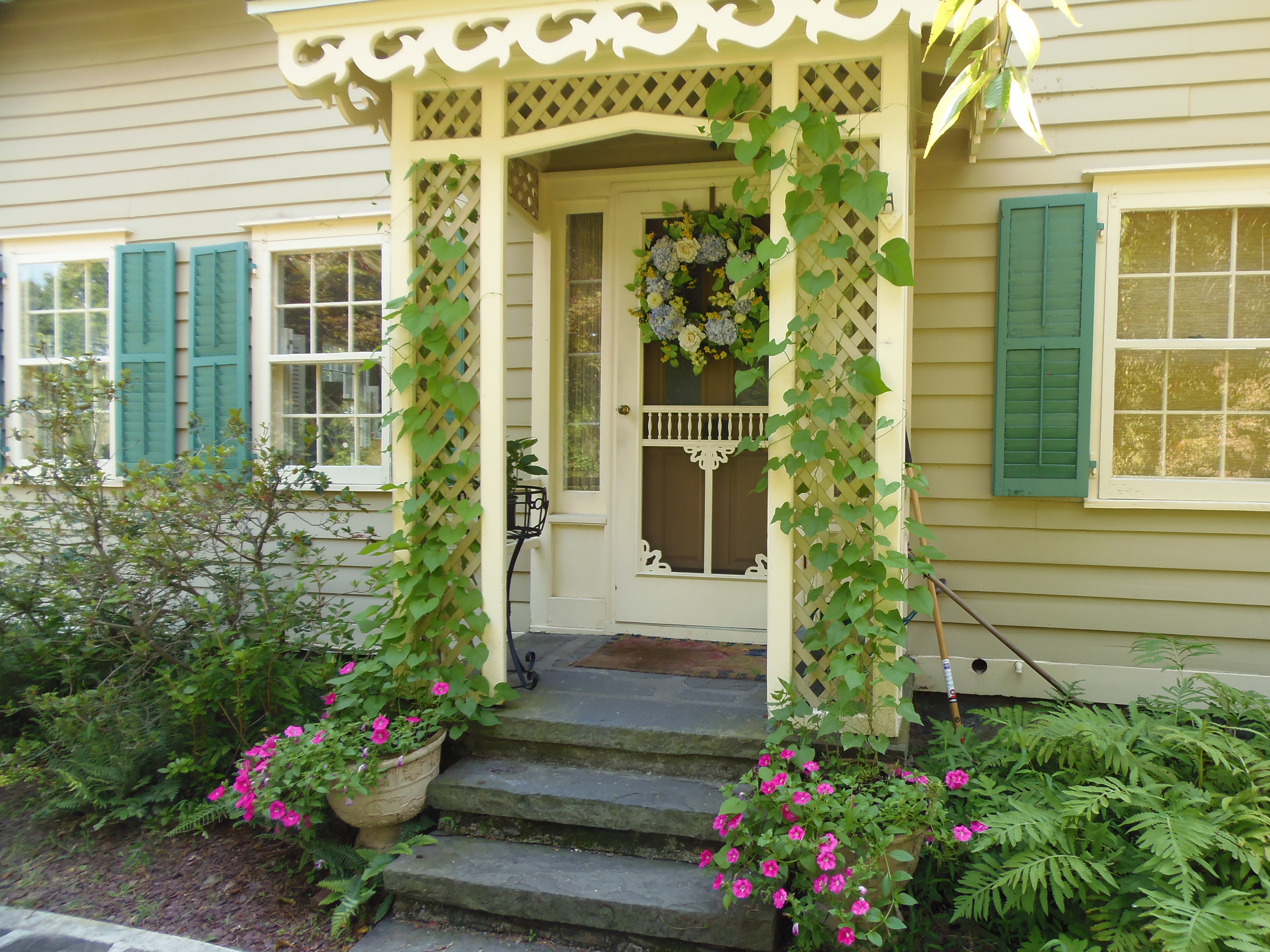
- Entrance to the house

- Location within New York Location within the United States
- Location: 16 Duncan Ln., Cornwall, New York
- Coordinates: 41°26′25″N 74°1′13″W
- Area: less than one acre
- Built: 1850
- Architectural style: Gothic Revival
- MPS: Cornwall MPS
- NRHP reference No.: 96001433
- Added to NRHP: December 6, 1996

Upland Lawn is a historic home located at Cornwall in Orange County, New York, USA. It was built about 1850 and is a 1 1/2-story, five-bay, center-hall-plan wood-frame dwelling in the Gothic Revival style. It features a steeply pitched, cross-gable roof with wood shingles.

It was listed on the National Register of Historic Places in 1996.
