= John G. Beakes House =

- U.S. National Register of Historic Places
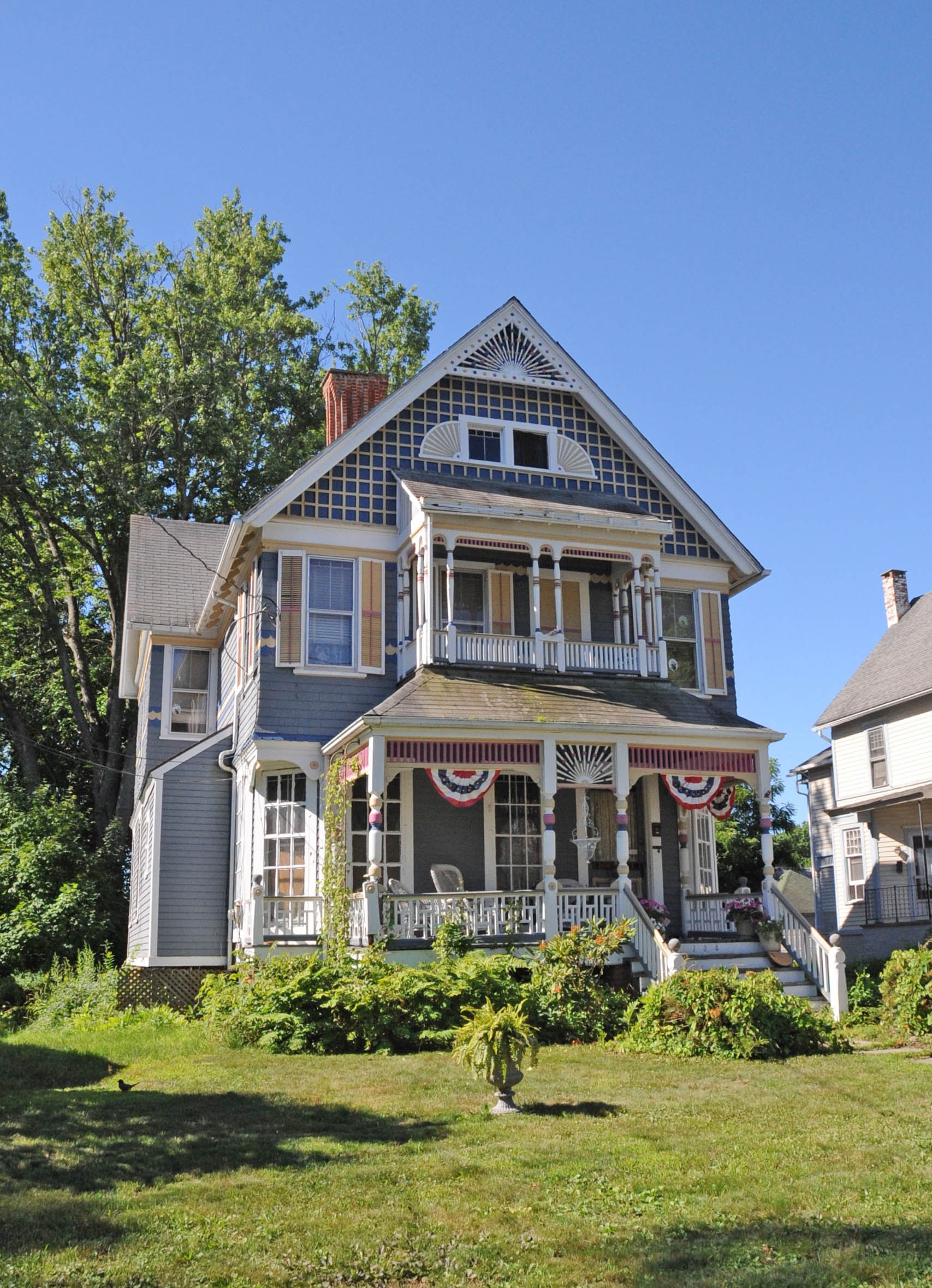
- John G. Beakes House, July 2018

- Location within New York
- Location: 134 W Main St, Middletown, New York
- Area: less than one acre
- Built: 1884, 1925
- Architectural style: Queen Anne
- NRHP reference No.: 10000939
- Added to NRHP: November 29, 2010

The John G. Beakes House is a historic house located in Middletown, New York. It was built about 1884, and is a two-story, wood frame dwelling with Queen Anne and Eastlake style detailing. It features a two-tiered porch and broad front gable, with grid work patterning. Also on the property is a contributing automobile garage built about 1925.

It was listed on the National Register of Historic Places in 2010.
