= Isaac Cocks House =

Historic house in New York, United States

- U.S. National Register of Historic Places
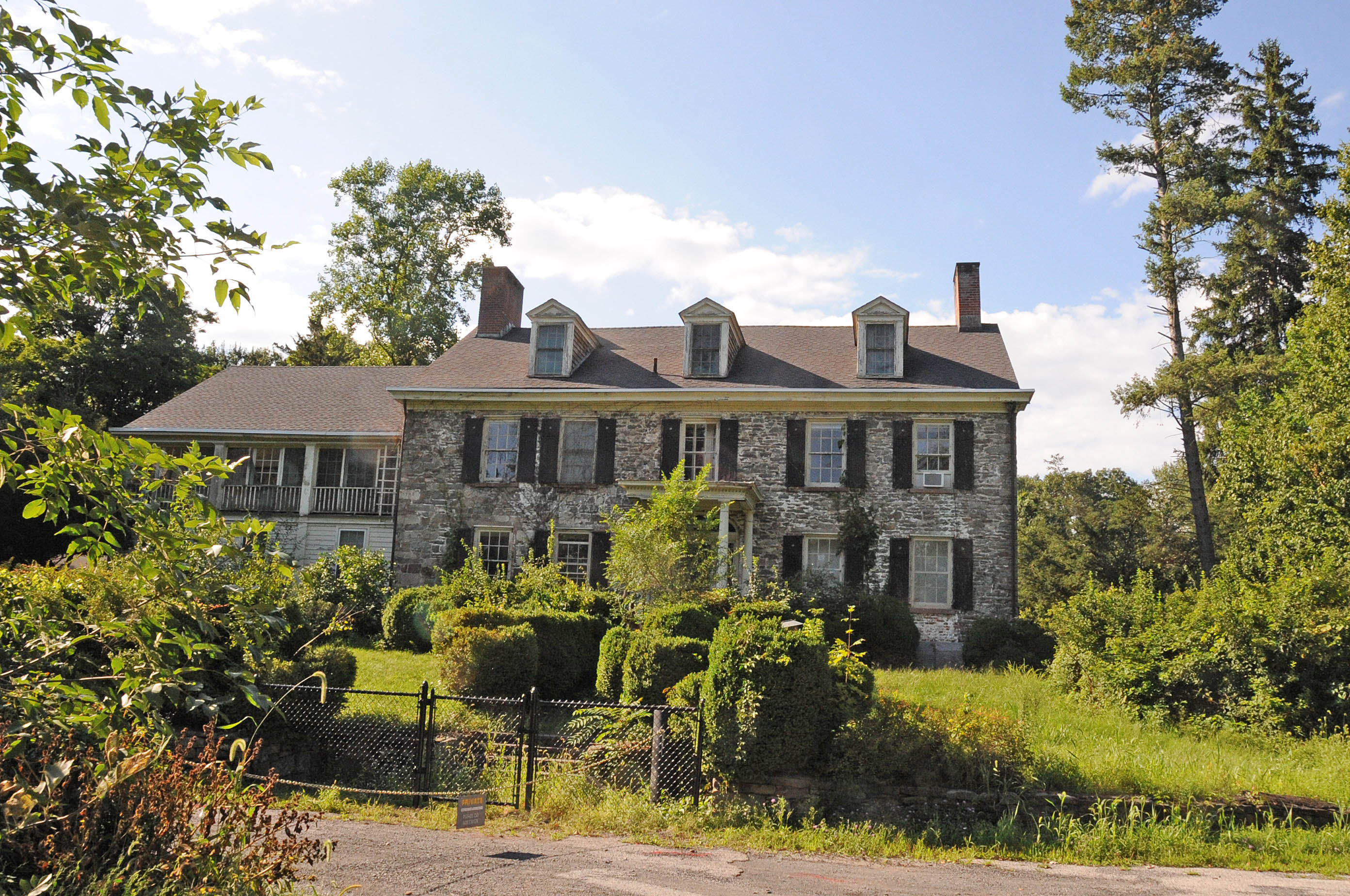

- Location within New York Location within the United States
- Location: Old Pleasant Hill Rd., Cornwall, New York
- Coordinates: 41°25′34″N 74°3′54″W
- Area: 1.5 acres (0.61 ha)
- Built: 1795
- Architectural style: Federal
- MPS: Cornwall MPS
- NRHP reference No.: 96000153
- Added to NRHP: March 8, 1996

Isaac Cocks House is a historic home located at Cornwall in Orange County, New York. The main house was built about 1795 and is a two-story, five-bay, center hall wood frame dwelling in the Federal style. It features clapboard siding and a fieldstone basement.

It was listed on the National Register of Historic Places in 1996.
