= Wyant-Talbot House =

Historic house in New York, United States

- U.S. National Register of Historic Places
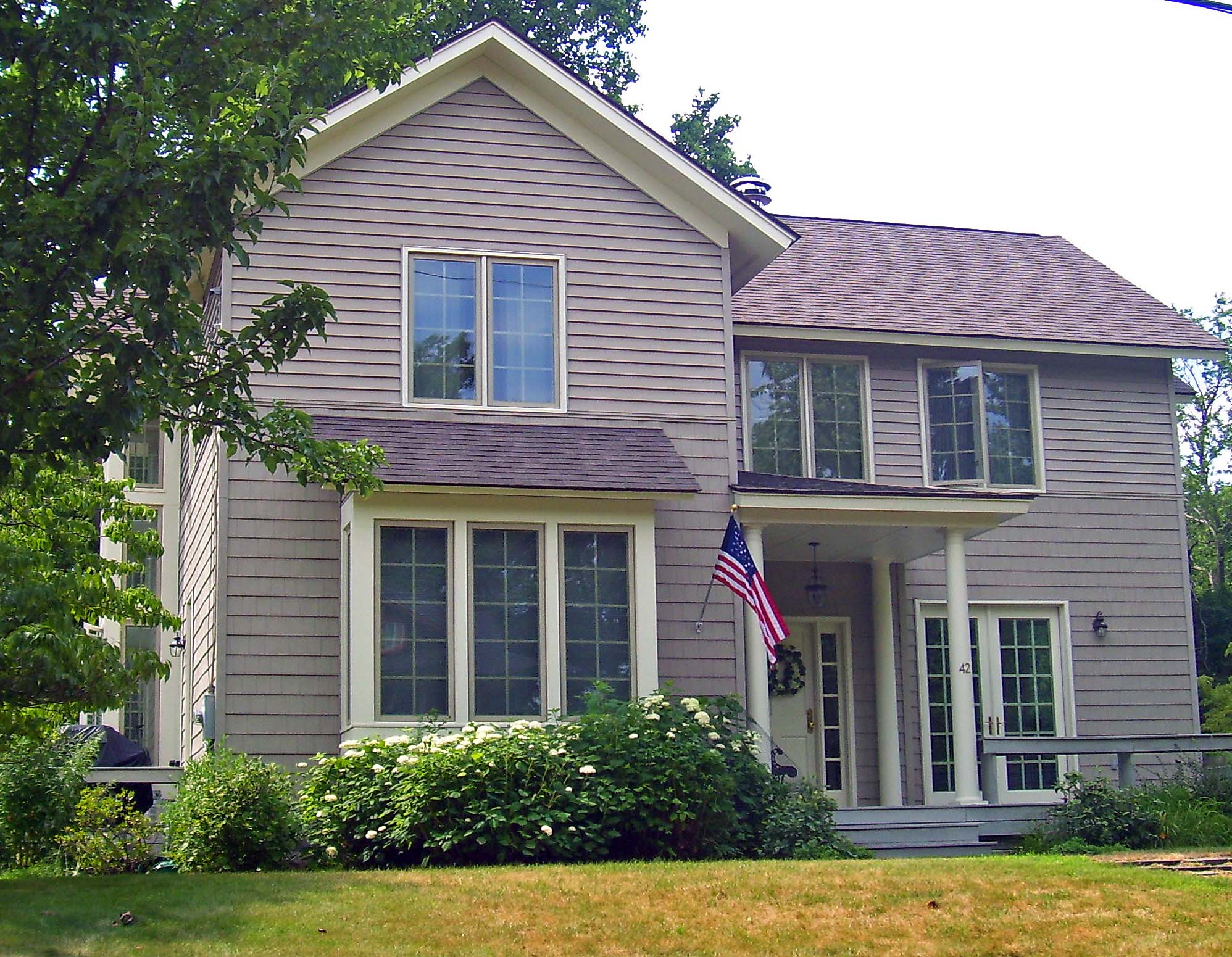
- House in 2007
- Location: Cornwall on Hudson, NY
- Nearest city: Newburgh
- Coordinates: 41°26′36″N 74°00′58″W
- Architectural style: Stick-Eastlake
- MPS: Cornwall MPS
- NRHP reference No.: 96000151
- Added to NRHP: March 8, 1996

The Wyant-Talbot House is located on Clark Avenue in the village of Cornwall on Hudson, New York. It is a Registered Historic Place, built around 1870 in the Queen Anne style by L.N. Wyant, a local merchant. Talbot owned a store in the village, and by 1891, most of Clark Avenue. It was added to the National Register of Historic Places in 1996.

Little is known about Mr. Leonard N. Wyant; in April 1880 he was elected an elder of the Cornwall Presbyterian Church.
