= Balmville Cemetery =

Historic cemetery in New York, United States

- U.S. National Register of Historic Places
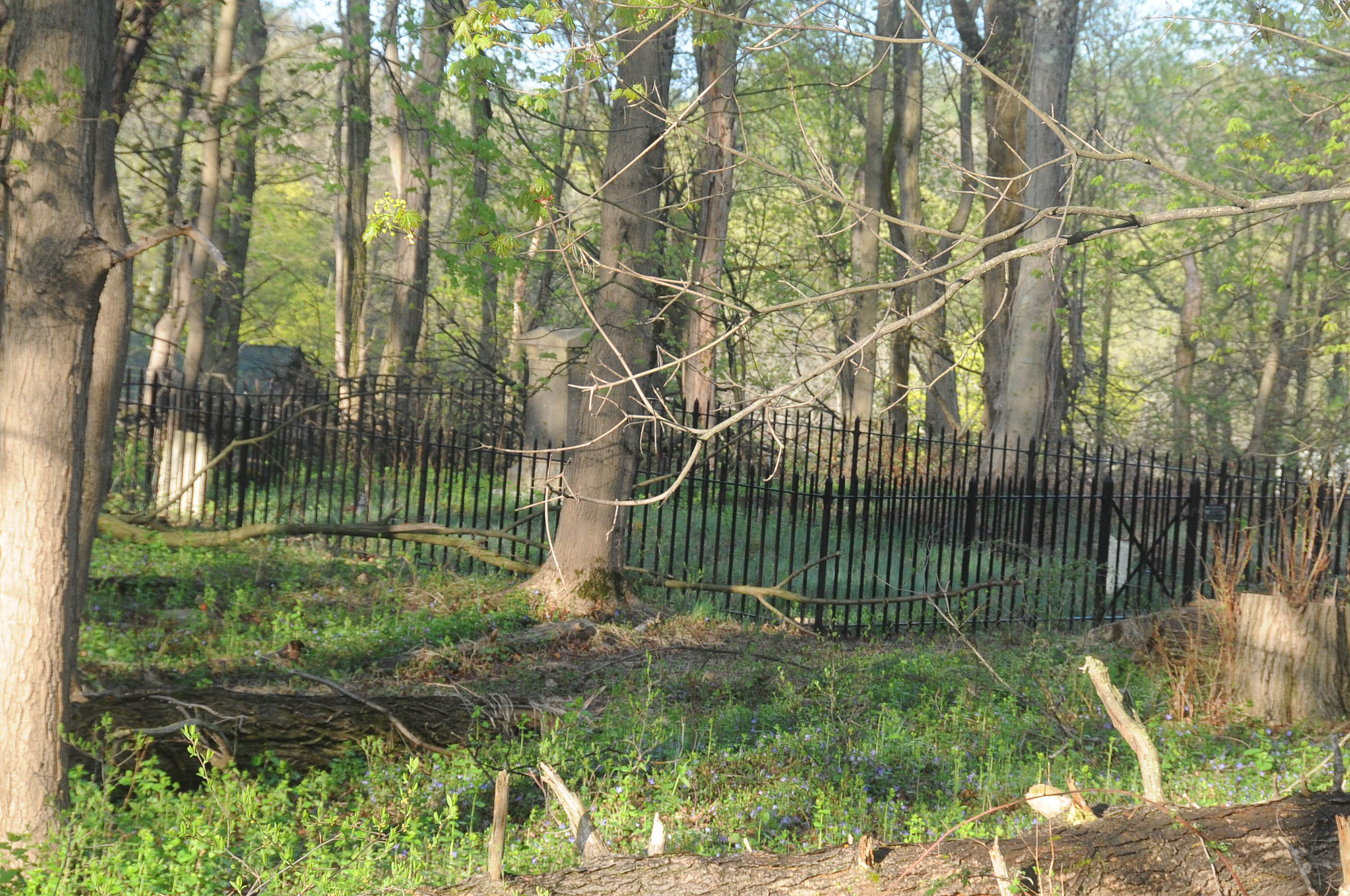

- Location within New York Location within the United States
- Location: Albany Post Road, Balmville, New York
- Coordinates: 41°32′05.1″N 74°00′42.63″W
- Area: 0.3 acres (0.12 ha)
- Built: 1820
- NRHP reference No.: 09001229
- Added to NRHP: January 19, 2010

Balmville Cemetery is a historic cemetery located on the grounds of Mount Saint Mary College at Balmville in Orange County, New York, United States. It was established in the early 19th century. It contains approximately 115 graves, most of which date from 1830 to 1860. Notable people buried at the cemetery include Captain Henry Butterworth (1784-1831) and Captain James Butterworth (1792-1826). Both participated in the War of 1812 and were active in the Balmville area. Captain Henry was stationed in Staten Island as part of the 5th Artillery and Infantry Regiment of the New York Militia. He was also a commissioner in the Balmville area later in his life. Captain James was part of the Consolidated Regiment of the New York Militia during the War of 1812.

It was listed on the National Register of Historic Places in 2009.
