= Jacob Shafer House =

Historic house in New York, United States

- U.S. National Register of Historic Places
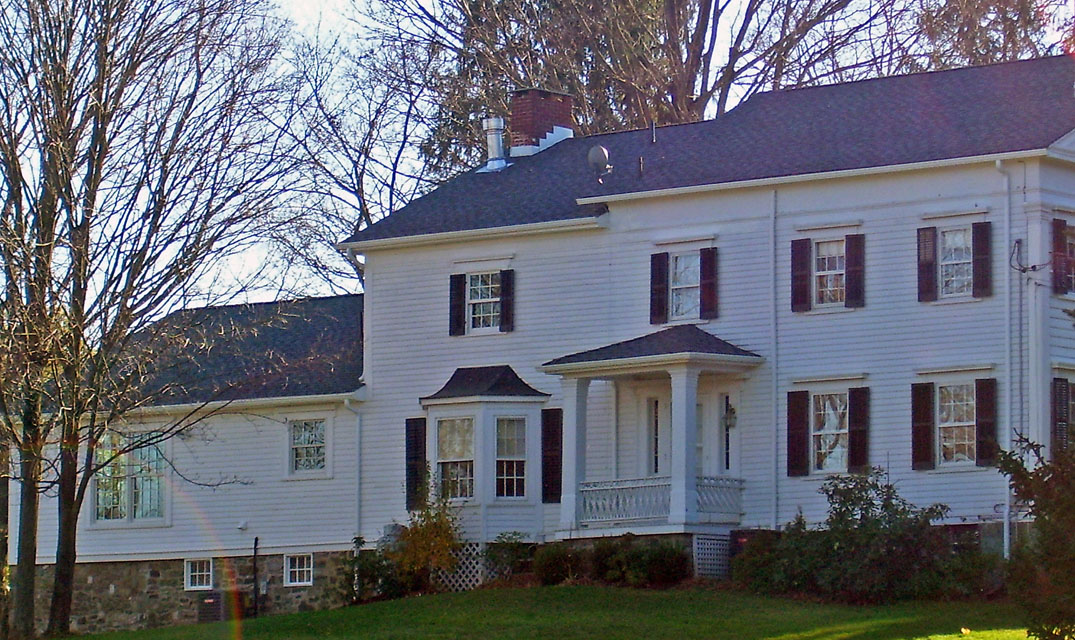
- The Shafer House from the northwest

- Location within New York Location within the United States
- Location: 388 Kaisertown Rd, Montgomery, New York
- Coordinates: 41°31′23″N 74°16′14″W
- Area: 7.9 acres (3.2 ha)
- Built: c. 1842
- Architectural style: Greek Revival
- NRHP reference No.: 96000864
- Added to NRHP: August 16, 1996

The Jacob Shafer House is a historic farmhouse located in Town of Montgomery in Orange County, New York. It is located on Kaisertown Road roughly a quarter-mile (400 m) south of NY 17K west of the village of Montgomery. The house was built about 1842, and is a two-story, three-bay, Greek Revival style frame dwelling with a 1 1/2-story wing. Also on the property are the contributing ruins of a barn complex and a stone lined well. It was built by Jacob Shafer, a prominent resident of the town.

It was added to the National Register of Historic Places in 1996.
