= Mount Emily Lumber Co. 1 =

Shay steam locomotive

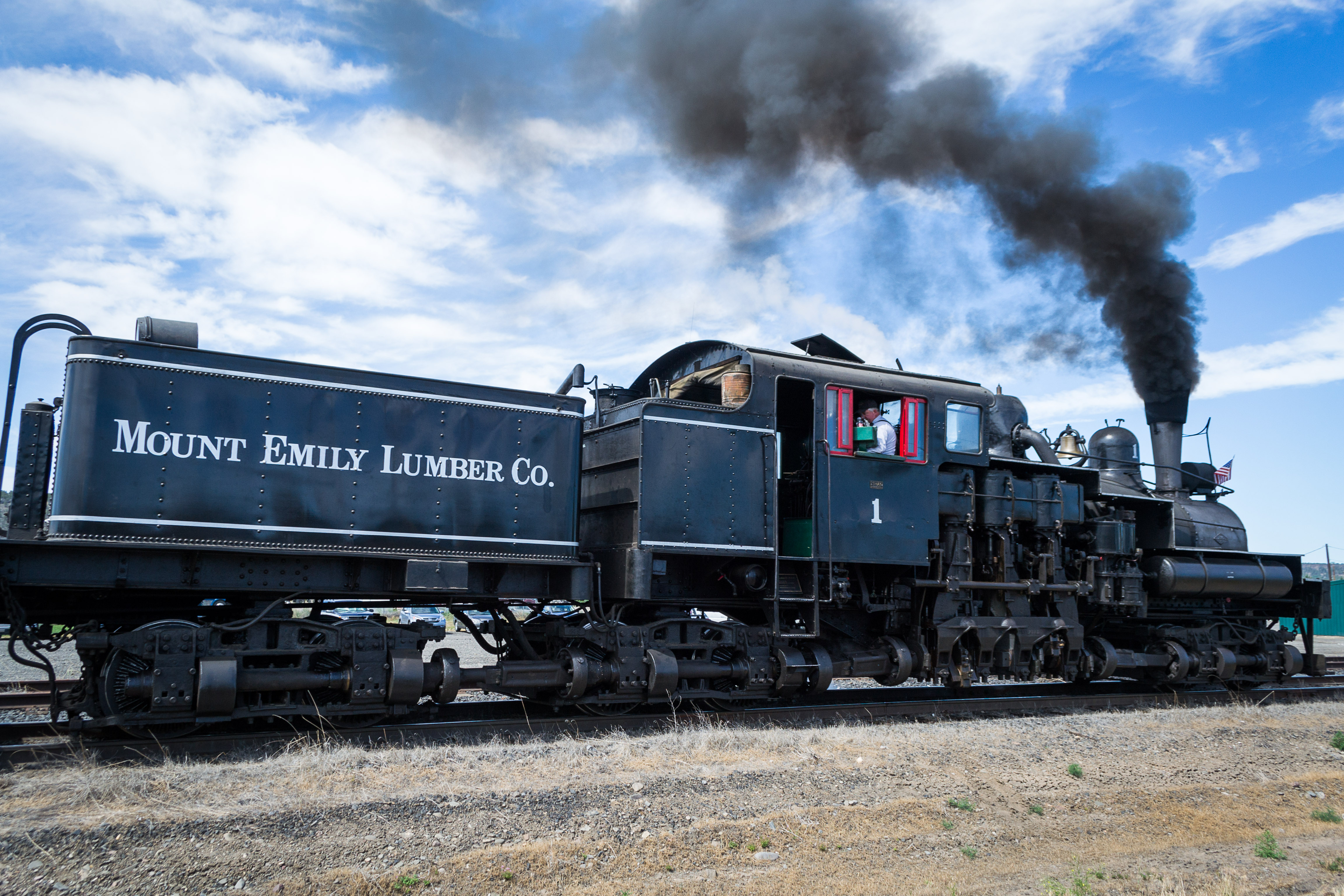
Type and origin
- Power type: Steam
- Builder: Lima Locomotive Works
- Serial number: 3233
- Build date: August 28, 1923
Specifications
- Configuration
  - Whyte: 3-truck Shay
  - AAR: B-B-B
- Gauge: 4 ft 8 1/2 in (1,435 mm)
- Trucks: 3
- Wheel diameter: 36 inches (0.914 m)
- Loco weight: 163,600 pounds (74,200 kg)
- Fuel type: Oil
- Fuel capacity: 1,200 US gallons (4,500 L; 1,000 imp gal)
- Water cap.: 3,000 US gallons (11,000 L; 2,500 imp gal)
- Boiler
  - Type: E.W.T.
  - Diameter: 50 inches (1,300 mm)
- Boiler pressure: 200 pounds per square inch (1,400 kPa)
- Cylinders: 3
- Cylinder size: 13.5 by 15 inches (340 mm × 380 mm)
- Gear ratio: 2.05
Performance figures
- Tractive effort: 35,026 pounds-force (155.80 kN)
- Factor of adh.: 5.50
Career
- Operators: Independence Logging Company; Mount Emily Lumber Company; Cass Scenic Railroad; City of Prineville Railway
- Class: C 80-3
- Official name: Mount Emily Shay
- Retired: 1955
- Restored: 1972
- Current owner: Oregon Rail Heritage Foundation
- Disposition: Stored, awaiting FRA inspection and overhaul

Mount Emily Lumber Company No. 1 is a three-truck or 'Class C' Shay steam locomotive that was originally owned by the Mount Emily Lumber Company. It was built on August 28, 1923 by the Lima Locomotive Works and delivered to Lima's Seattle dealer, Hofius Steel and Equipment Company of Seattle, Washington. It was later sold to the Independence Logging Company of Independence, Washington, and then it was later sold to the Mount Emily Lumber Company of La Grande, Oregon. When it was retired in 1955, it was donated to the Oregon Museum of Science and Industry. Three years later, in 1958, it was donated to the Oregon Historical Society of Portland, Oregon. The engine was operational at Cass Scenic Railroad and the City of Prineville Railroad for many years. It was announced in 2022 that the Oregon Rail Heritage Foundation would be the new owners of No. 1.

== History ==
No. 1 was initially manufactured as a stock locomotive on August 28, 1923, at the Lima Locomotive Works plant in Lima, Ohio, where nearly 2,800 other geared Shay engines were built. No. 1’s first owner was the Hofius Steel and Equipment Company, Lima's Seattle dealer, and it was delivered to their property in Seattle, Washington. The following month, No. 1 was sold to the Independence Logging Company. Before the engine was delivered to Independence Logging in Aberdeen, Washington, Hofius employees altered No. 1’s builders plate by chiseling off the word "August" and stamping in the word "September", which would imply the engine was brand new. After being moved to Independence, Washington, No. 1 was used to pull log trains for the next four years.

On February 20, 1928, No. 1 was sold again to the just starting up Mount Emily Lumber Company and moved to Hilgard, Oregon by the Union Pacific Railroad. The engine was used to pull log trains from the forests above Starkey, on a shortline between La Grande and Hilgard in Eastern Oregon.

In 1955, the Mount Emily Company was bought out by the Valsetz Lumber Company, and the rail line was discontinued in favor of log shipping by truck. The company then offered to donate Mount Emily Willamette locomotive No. 4 to the Oregon Museum of Science and Industry, since it was manufactured within the city of Portland. However, the salvage crew in charge of scrapping the former Mount Emily equipment was not informed about No. 4’s status, and they dismantled the Willamette before it could be moved. As a compensation, Valsetz had Shay No. 1 donated to the Museum, instead. The engine was stored inside a Union Pacific roundhouse in La Grande until that facility was demolished in 1958, and No. 1 was subsequently moved to the Northern Pacific Terminal yards in Portland. At that time UP towed the Shay (with the line shafts still installed) at 10 mph from LaGrande all the way to Portland. The Oregon Museum initially planned to use the Shay in a Washington Park facility near Oregon Zoo, but No. 1 was found to be too tall and wide to fit through a tunnel on the way to Washington Park, and any alternative routes were deemed impractical.

In 1958, the Oregon Museum gave up on finding a location to store No. 1, and so they donated it to the Oregon Historical Society (OHS), which was also based in Portland. Throughout the 1960s, the OHS moved No. 1 around various sidings in rail yards within Portland. It was occasionally repainted for display at certain railroad conventions that took place during that decade, including the first west coast NRHS convention, held in Portland in 1965. During one convention in 1969, members from the Cass Scenic Railroad saw the engine on display, and they considered No. 1 to be a good candidate to operate in tourist service alongside the Cass Scenic Railroad’s other restored geared engines in West Virginia.

Subsequently in 1971, through the efforts of railfan and NRHS member Jack Holst, a long-term loan was signed by the OHS and the Cass Scenic, so the Cass Scenic could restore and operate No. 1 on their trackage. After being shipped to Cass, West Virginia, work began to restore No. 1 to operating condition, and during that process, it was renumbered to 3. Restoration was completed in May 1972, and No. 3 started being used as a helper for other geared engines to climb up steep grades.

2 months later, however, an engine shed in Cass where No. 3 was stored had burned down, causing damage to No. 3. Cass Scenic crews spent the next 2 years overhauling No. 3 before it was fired up again in 1974, and the engine subsequently resumed in operating for the Cass Scenic without incident.

When the long-term loan expired in 1992, the OHS, with guidance expertise and help of railroad enthusiast Martin E. Hansen, reached an agreement with the City of Prineville Railway to have the Shay operate on their trackage around Prineville, Oregon. No. 3 was then moved to Prineville in 1994, where it was renumbered back to 1, and it was placed into service on the Prineville line. It was used to pull the Crooked River Dinner Excursion and a variety of special excursion trips for school students. It would also haul hundreds of passengers during Independence Day.

She would continue in service on the City of Prineville Ry for nearly 30 years. She even was shipped behind SP No. 4449 down to Railfair 99 in Sacramento, California where she participated in “Shay Races” with Graham County Shay No. 1925.

However, as time went on, the Prineville Railway slowly operated No. 1 less and less often, since insurance costs were rising, and growing businesses decreased the amount of available space to park a train to load passengers. The Shay received her last 1472-day inspection in 2006. After the Great Recession of 2008, the excursions on the Railway were further diminishing.

After the COVID-19 pandemic happened, and the shay by 2021 was due for another such 1472-day inspection, the Prineville Railway notified the OHS that, although they were pleased to have had the honor of storing the Shay, they opted not to operate No. 1 any longer, and they requested for their lease agreement to be put to an end. Since the OHS would not be able to operate a steam engine on their own, they analyzed several options about what to do with their engine. After a decision was made deaccession the Shay, on April 1, 2022, the OHS issued a request for proposals while forming a committee of Railroad personnel to analyze a new owner and a new home for No. 1. 3 proponents proposed to acquire the Shay and move it to their property.

One of those proponents was the Oregon Rail Heritage Foundation, which was in search for an active steam engine to use to pull their annual Christmas trains (Holiday Express) on the Oregon Pacific Railroad from Portland through to Oaks Park in Sellwood. The Foundation previously used Southern Pacific No. 4449 and Spokane, Portland and Seattle No. 700 for the trains, but their heavy weight and long rigid wheelbases caused wear and damage to the Oregon Pacific trackage, and by 2022, both 4-8-4 engines were restricted from running on the Oregon Pacific Railroad along the Springwater Corridor through to Oaks Park. Because of this, the Foundation needed a smaller engine that could accommodate the Oregon Pacific Railroad line while pulling the "Holiday Express" trains.

On August 24, 2022, an OHS meeting was held that regarded who was to be the engine’s new selected owner, with all 3 of the proponents’ properties already being examined. A few days later on September 1, the OHS publicly announced that ownership of Mount Emily No. 1 would permanently be transferred to the Oregon Rail Foundation.

However, the Shay needs to be re-certified before it could operate along the Springwater Corridor on the Oregon Pacific Railroad to Oaks Park. No. 1 was previously stored in Prineville, until the Foundation had No. 1 moved from Prineville to Portland via flatcar in Feb. 2024. It was moved inside the Oregon Rail Heritage Center in October 2024. It then will perform a 1,472-day boiler inspection in order to have it re-tubed and to be re-certified by the FRA. Once operational again, No. 1 will take over the annual "Holiday Express" trains, and other trips, to Oaks Park for years to come. The Foundation also plans on using No. 1 as a historic example in educating the public about how logging railroads played an important role in the logging industry of the Pacific Northwest.

== Gallery ==
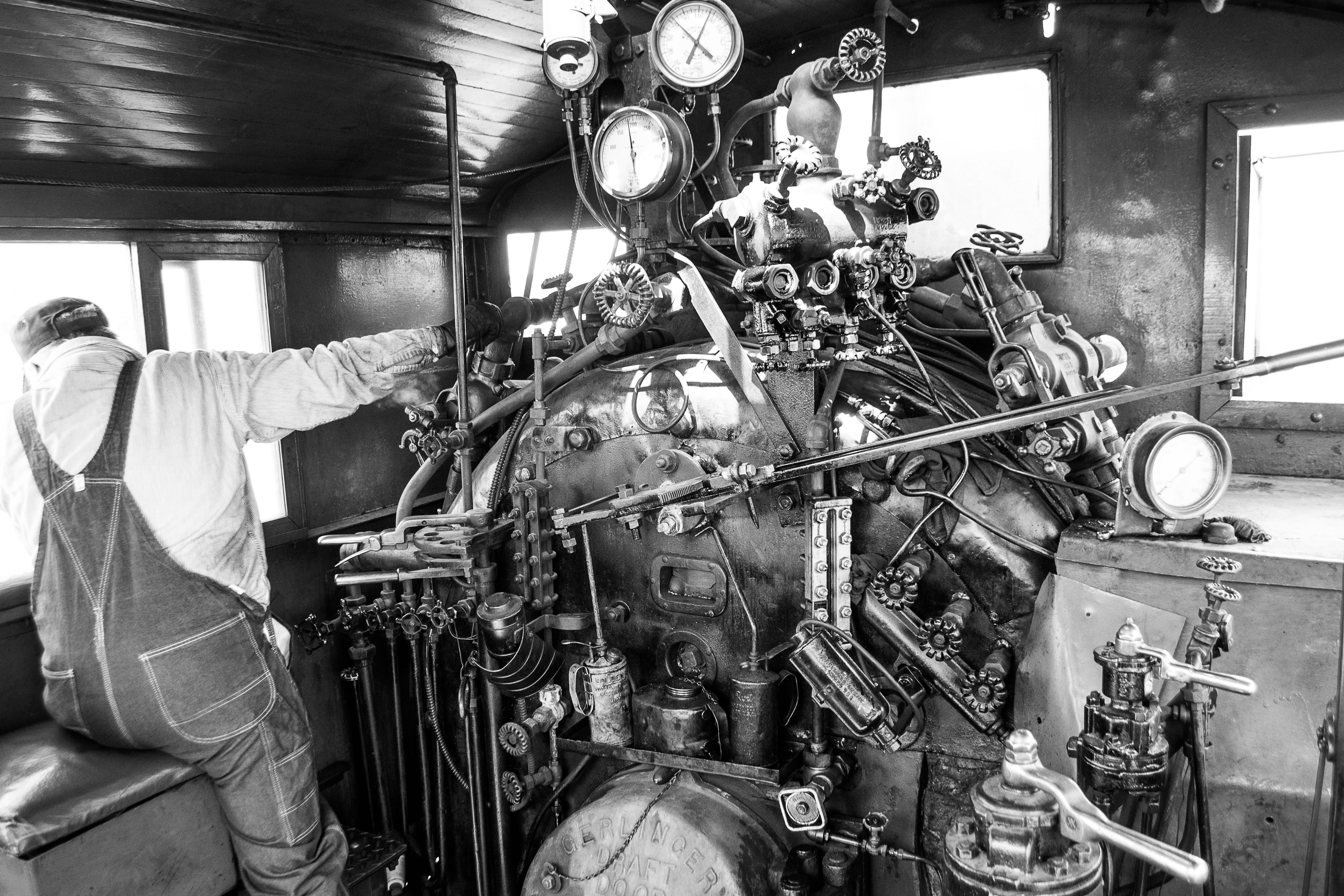
The interior of No. 1’s cab

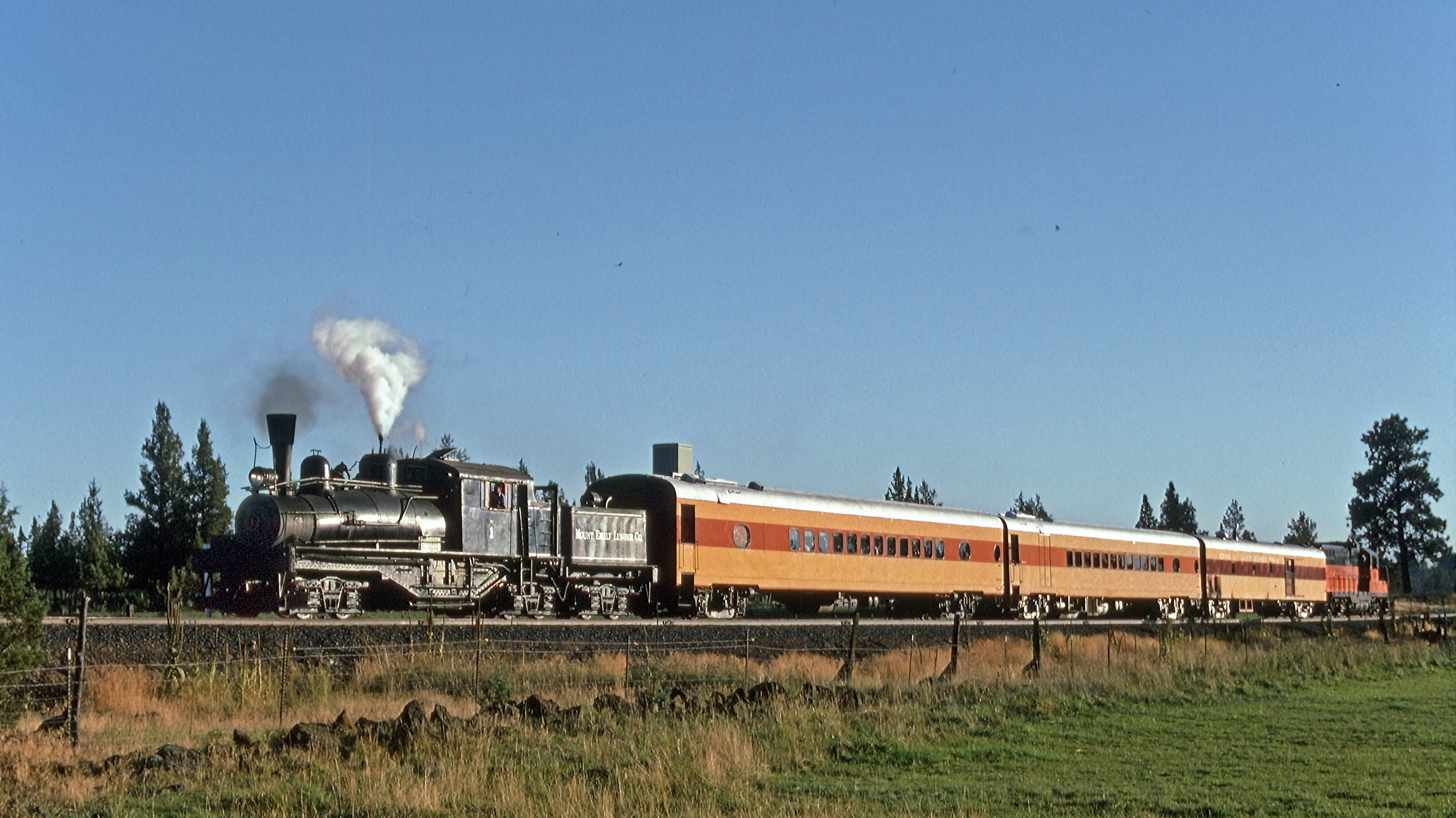
No. 1 pulling a tourist train during the annual Railroad Days event on September 13, 2003

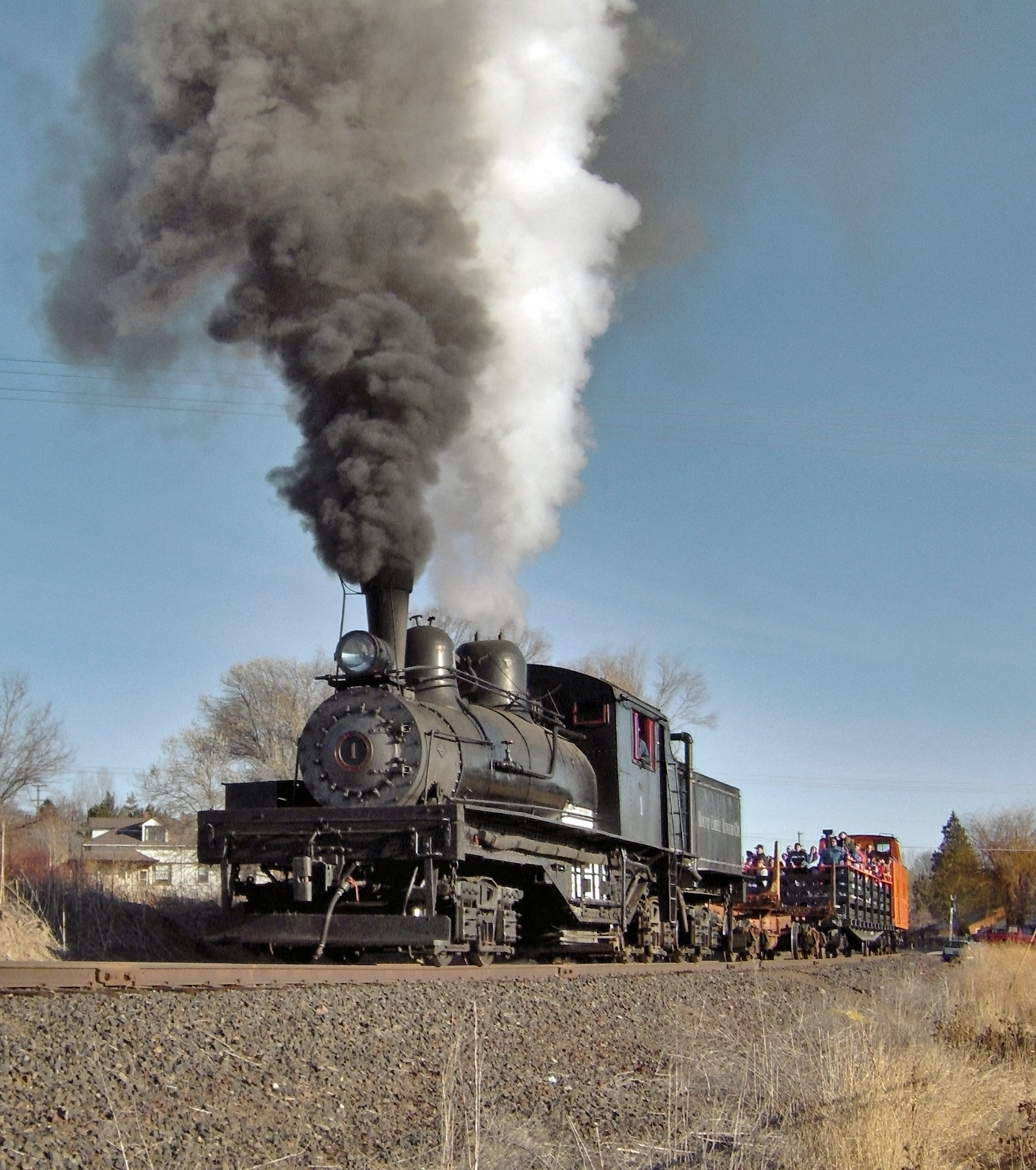
No. 1 making a tourist run on December 2, 2006

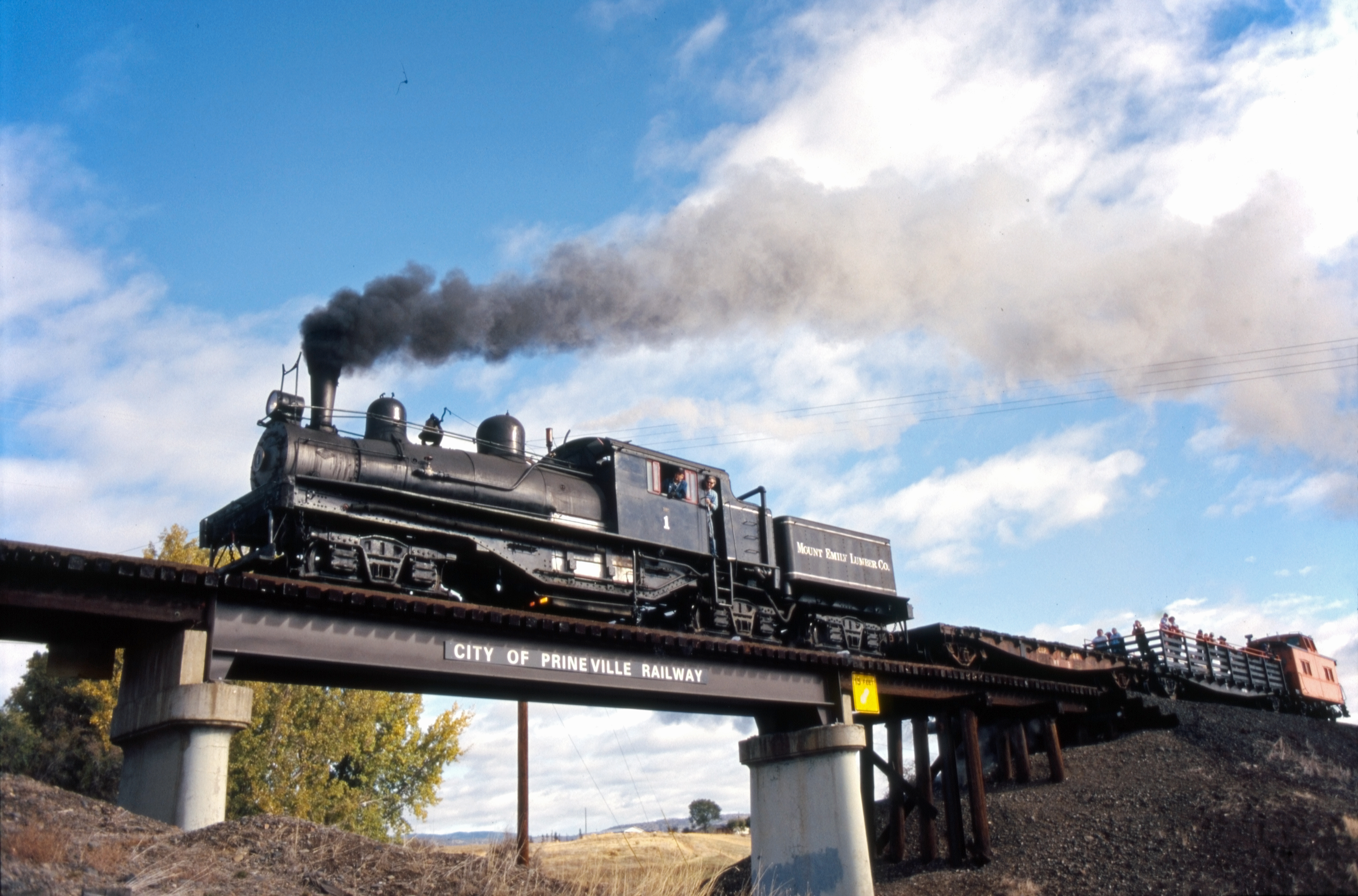
No. 1 pulling a tourist trip during the 125th Anniversary of Crook County on October 20, 2007

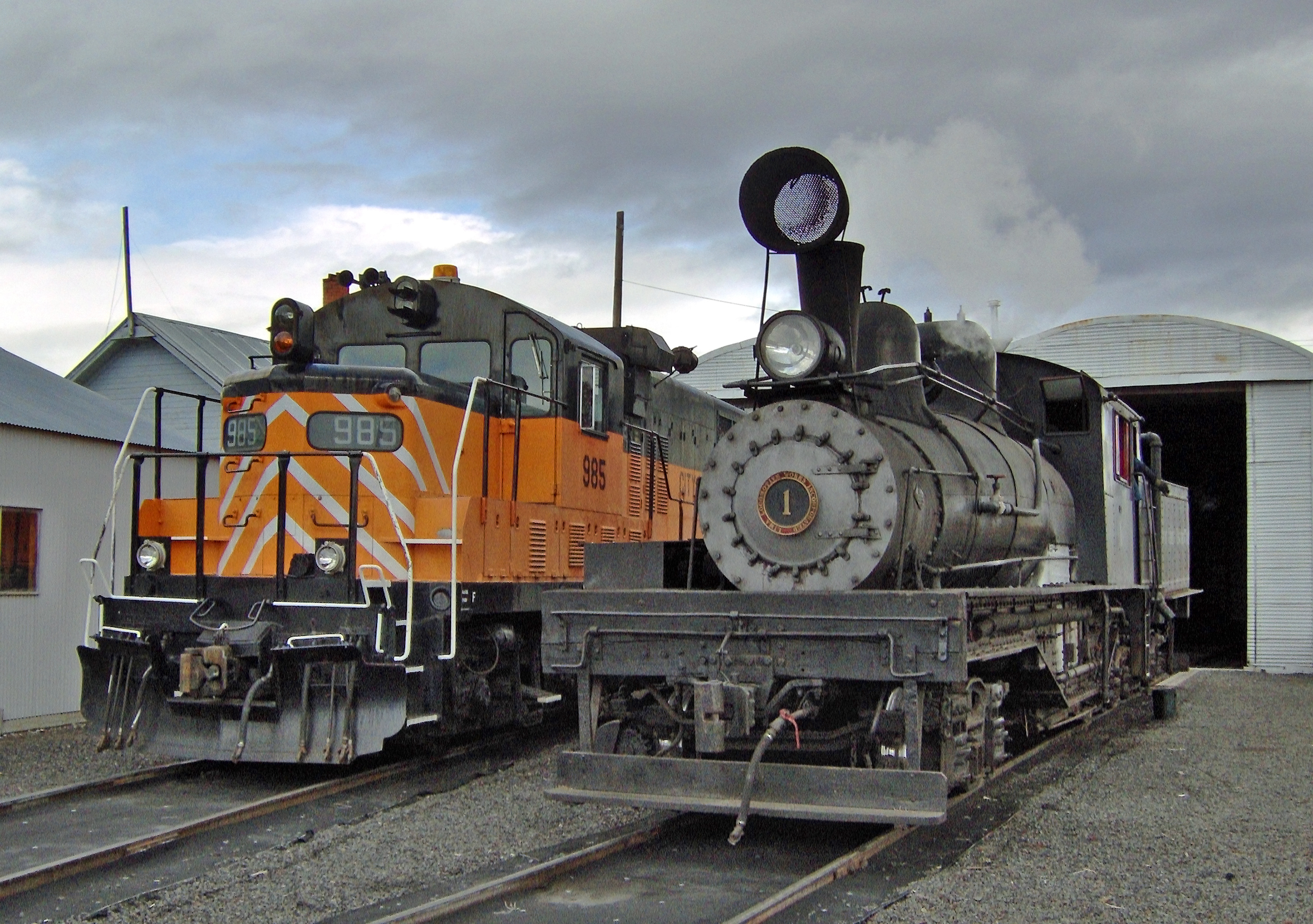
No. 1 sitting side by side with City of Prineville #985

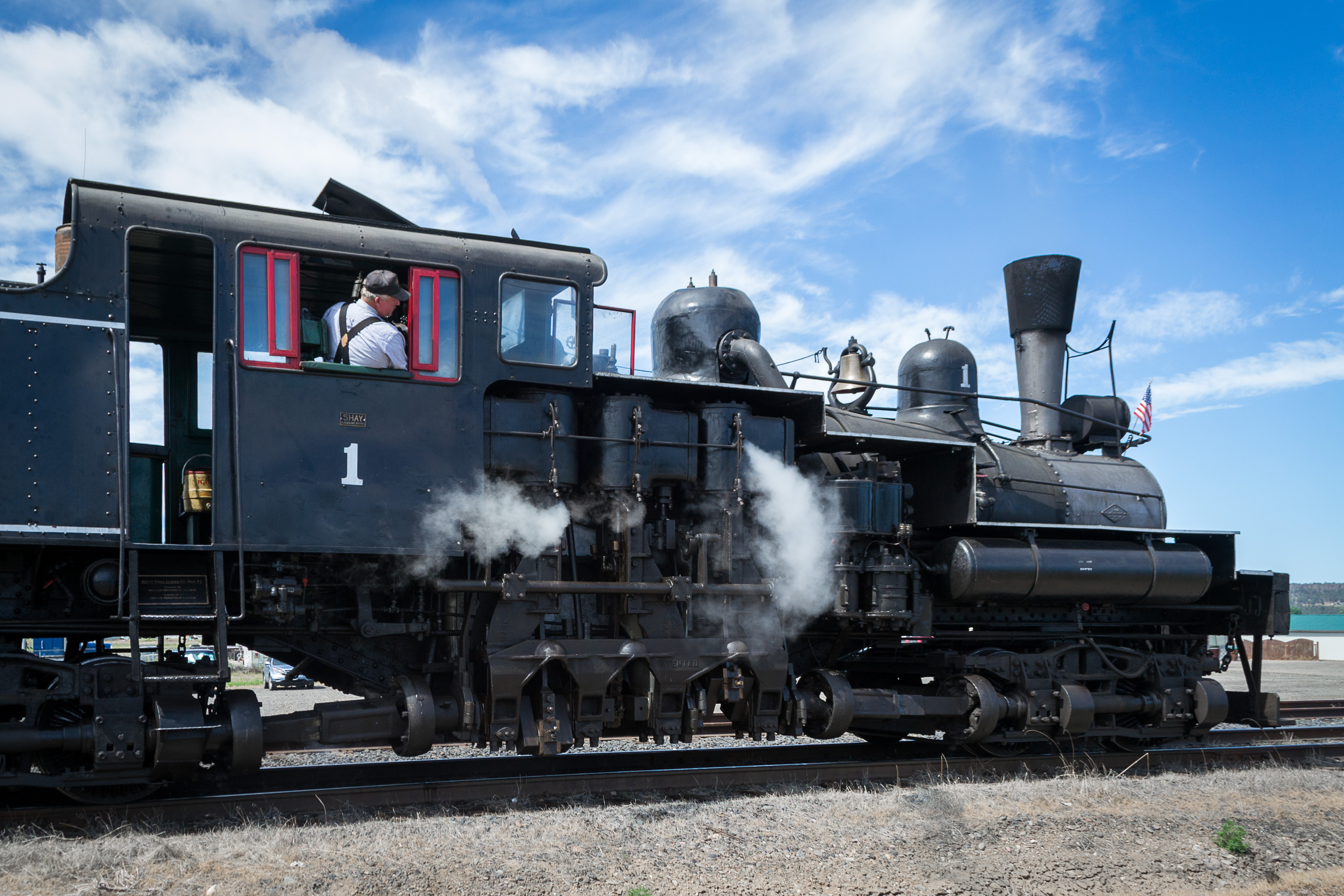
No. 1 operating on July 4, 2013

== See also ==
- Robert Dollar Co. No. 3
- Hetch Hetchy 6
- Virginia and Truckee 22 Inyo
- McCloud Railway 25
