= Middletown and New Jersey Railroad =

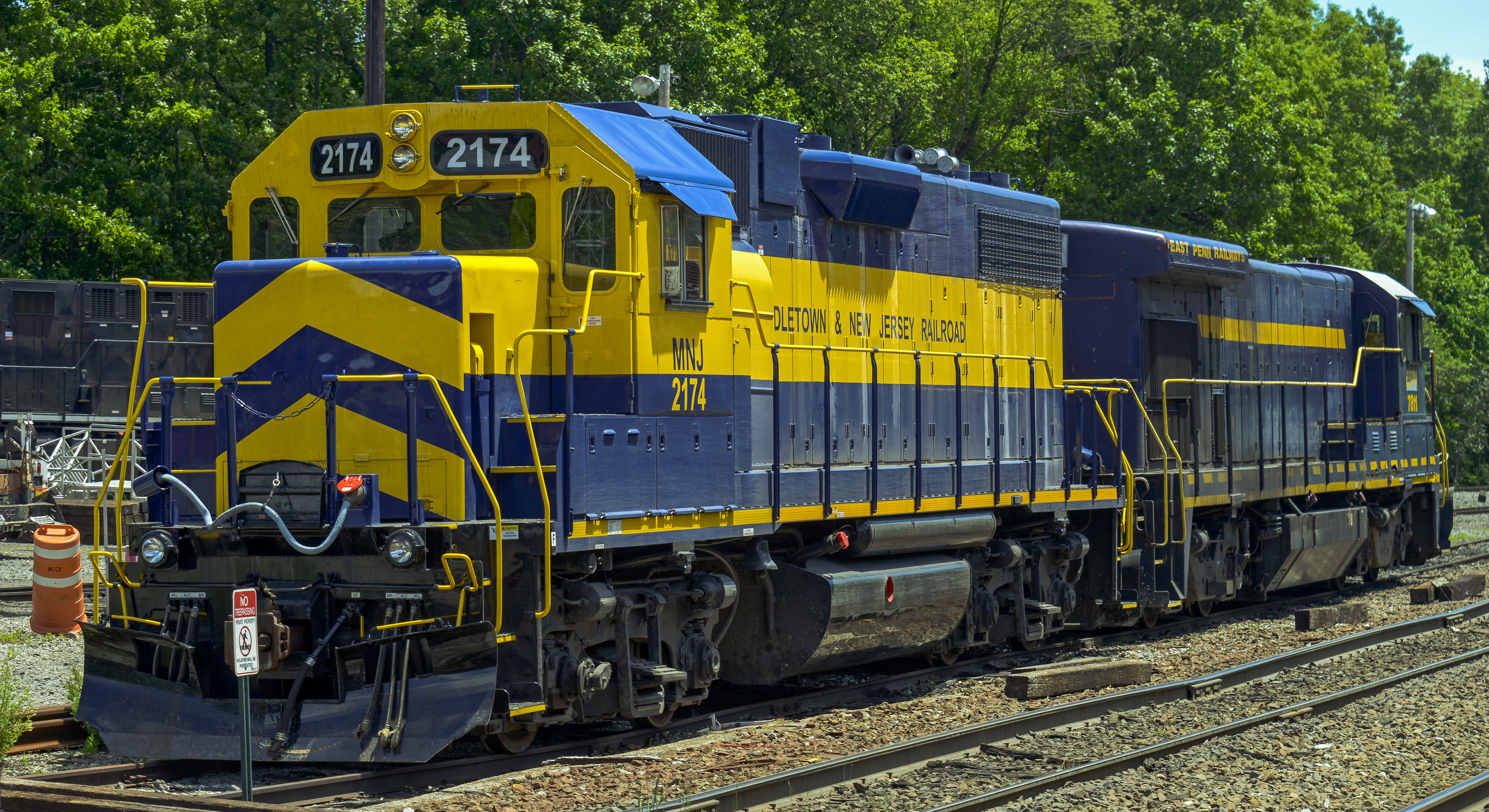
- M&NJ locomotive No. 2174 parked at Campbell Hall

Overview
- Headquarters: Kennett Square, Pennsylvania
- Reporting mark: MNJ
- Locale: Middletown, New York
- Dates of operation: 1947–present
- Predecessor: New York and Erie Railroad; Middletown, Unionville and Water Gap Railroad; New York and Oswego Midland Railroad; New York, Susquehanna and Western Railroad; Erie Railroad; Middletown and Unionville Railroad

Technical
- Track gauge: 4 ft 8 1/2 in (1,435 mm) standard gauge
- Previous gauge: formerly 6 ft (1,829 mm) broad gauge

Other
- Website: www.mnjrr.com

The Middletown and New Jersey Railroad (reporting mark MNJ) is one of two railroads in the city of Middletown, New York; the other being its interchange partner, Norfolk Southern Railway. The MNJ consists of 43 miles (69 km) of track in southeastern New York serving Orange County and the Hudson Valley. The railroad also operates and has trackage rights on three additional branch lines (the Hudson Secondary, Maybrook and Walden Industrials, and Southern Tier) totalling 40 miles (64 km) leased from Norfolk Southern in Orange County. It was known as the Middletown and New Jersey Railway until 2009, when East Penn Railroad parent Regional Rail, LLC bought the line through a new subsidiary. In 2015, Regional Rail was in turn acquired by Levine Leichtman Capital Partners ("LLCP").

In 2012, the Middletown and New Jersey Railroad, LLC, received a $1.6 million New York State Department of Transportation (NYSDOT) grant to perform rail upgrades on the four lines it operates in Orange County. The railroad rehabilitated the line between Campbell Hall and Warwick and portions of the track in Middletown and between Walden and Montgomery.

== History and predecessors ==
=== New York & Erie Railroad ===
The first railroad to reach Middletown was the New York and Erie Railroad, a predecessor of the Erie Railroad, which reached the hamlet on June 1, 1843 and remained the only railroad in the immediate region for over two decades. In the early 1840s, the NY&E fostered the growth of the Orange County dairy industry by developing the capacity to ship fluid milk to New York City without spoilage. This development provided the area's dairy farmers, who had hitherto been limited to the shipment of butter, with a far more profitable business opportunity. Furthermore, by greatly accelerating the expansion of Orange County's dairy industry, this development helped foster the creation of a number of small railroads in southeast New York State, including the predecessor of the Middletown and New Jersey, the Middletown, Unionville and Water Gap Railroad. The NY&E was reorganized as the Erie Railroad on April 30, 1861.

=== Middletown, Unionville and Water Gap Railroad ===
In 1866, public meetings were held in Middletown, Westtown and Unionville, New York, to discuss the viability of a railroad via these hamlets to Deckertown, Sussex County, New Jersey. A route was surveyed from there to Middletown, but, as built, the Middletown, Unionville and Water Gap Railroad only extended from a connection with the NY&E in Middletown to Unionville, which was reached on December 6, 1867, after fourteen months of construction. Freight cars received from the Erie made the 14-mile (23 km) trip to Unionville starting January 13, 1868. The MU&WG was built to the 6-foot (1.8 m) broad gauge of the Erie. The road was leased to the Erie and commenced regular operations as the Erie's "Unionville Branch" on May 15, 1868.

=== New York and Oswego Midland Railroad ===
On January 11, 1866, the New York and Oswego Midland Railroad was incorporated with the goal of linking Oswego, New York, on Lake Ontario, with the Hudson River at a point across from New York City. The NY&OM reached Middletown in 1871 and hoped to connect with three New Jersey companies to form a through route to New York Harbor. The three New Jersey roads merged in 1870 to form the New Jersey Midland Railroad, which built west in 1871 from Two Bridges (Beaver Lake) to the New Jersey/New York state line at Hanford, just south of Unionville. The link between the NY&OM and the NJM would be the MU&WG, which was leased by the NY&OM effective April 1, 1872. The MU&WG was standard-gauged, and the NY&OM built just over 1 mile (1.6 km) of track to bridge the MU&WG over the Erie and connect it to the NY&OM at East Main Street, Middletown. The NY&OM soon entered bankruptcy and dropped the lease on the MU&WG which was then leased by the NJM in 1873.

=== New York, Susquehanna and Western Railroad ===
The NJM reorganized into the Midland Railroad of New Jersey in 1880 and in 1881 merged with several other roads to form the New York, Susquehanna and Western Railroad. Meanwhile, the NY&OM reorganized as the New York, Ontario and Western in 1879, and the Erie reorganized as the New York, Lake Erie & Western in 1878. The MU&WG wound up in a very favorable situation, with connections to three major carriers, the NYLE&W (Erie) and O&W in Middletown and the NYS&W at Hanford. This offered the MU&WG's shippers the choice of multiple freight routings and enabled the shortline to gain better freight rates and a bigger share of the revenue by having the big carriers compete for its traffic. This advantage continued for decades and was enjoyed by its successors, the M&U and the M&NJ, until the late 1950s.

=== Erie Railroad again in control ===
The MU&WG was the west end of the NYS&W until the NYS&W built west in 1882 from Two Bridges to Gravel Place, near Stroudsburg, Pennsylvania, to gain a link to the anthracite fields via a connection with the Delaware, Lackawanna and Western. The MU&WG then functioned as the NYS&W's Middletown Branch. In 1898, the Erie Railroad, successor to the NYLE&W in 1895, gained control of the NYS&W and thus gained control of the MU&WG for the second time. The MU&WG was a very desirable property because of the tremendous milk traffic it originated, possibly the greatest in the United States at that time on a mile for mile basis. Milk was shipped to the New York metropolitan region via all three of the MU&WG's connections. Creameries and condenseries were built along the route at Pounds Station (just south of Middletown), Slate Hill, Johnson, Westtown and Unionville.

=== Middletown and Unionville Railroad ===
The MU&WG was taken over by the bondholders of its two mortgages on September 8, 1913 because the Erie failed to pay the interest on the bonds. The bondholders organized an independent shortline, the Middletown and Unionville Railroad, which began operations on December 1, 1913 under Vice President and General Manager J. A. Smith. The road enjoyed the revenues from its heavy milk traffic, fluid and condensed, as well as related commodities such as livestock, feed, bottles and coal for the powerhouses.

=== Middletown and New Jersey Railroad ===
The M&U was sold at a foreclosure sale on January 15, 1947 to the three feed dealers, Manning, Simmons and Clark, who reorganized the company as the Middletown and New Jersey Railway Company, Inc. on October 1, 1947. Traffic in the 1950s was dominated by a large GLF feed mill near Dolson Ave. in Middletown. By the mid-1950s, the three owners had died and the railroad was sold around 1956 to John Manning and Marc Suffern.

== Decline in traffic and revival ==
A substantial passenger service, often using railbuses, was offered with emphasis on carrying high school students from hamlets along the line to Middletown High School. Construction of a new high school far from the tracks resulted in cancellation of the school district's contract and the Middletown and Unionville abolished passenger service with the end of the school year in June 1940.

A multi-year, see-saw battle with truck competition ended with the final shipment of milk on August 18, 1941 from Borden at Johnson. Between 1938 and 1942, the NYS&W, newly independent from Erie control, and the O&W developed a very close relationship, reminiscent of the "Midland Route" of an earlier era, and for a short period routed heavy coal traffic from the O&W to the NYS&W via the M&U, once again serving as the link between the two.

In the late 1950s the M&NJ lost two of its three connections as the O&W ceased operations on March 29, 1957 and the NYS&W abandoned its Hanford Branch the next year. On February 20, 1960, the railroad was sold to three partners, Jay Wulfson, Jim Wright and Pierre Rasmussen. The GLF mill at Dolson Ave. burned down on March 30, 1962 but was rebuilt as a much larger facility including a custom mix plant and a bulk plant with an annual capacity of 50,000 tons. GLF soon merged into Agway. The complex received as many as a dozen loads daily. In the early 1960s, the Empire State Railway Museum ran diesel and steam excursions over the line until relocating to Essex, Connecticut, in the mid-1960s. The ESRM has returned to New York but is now located on the Catskill Mountain Railroad in Phoenicia, New York.

Service on the south end of the line was cut back about 7 miles (11 km) to Johnson with the last run to Unionville on December 31, 1968. Within two years service was cut back two more miles to Slate Hill. Agway opened a fertilizer plant near Dolson Ave. in 1966; Balchem opened a chemical plant in an old creamery in Slate Hill in 1968 and Polytherm Plastics (now Genpak) constructed a plant in Middletown in 1969 to produce plastic plates and dishes.

These three customers were the only customers in the late 1980s and through the 1990s as the Agway feed mill at Dolson Ave. closed in the mid-1980s. Agway Fertilizer closed in June 2000 and Balchem ended rail service soon after. Pete Rasmussen became majority owner and President/General Manager of the railroad when Wulfson left to start up the Vermont Railway in the mid-1960s and sold his stock to Rasmussen.

Upon President and General Manager Pierre "Pete" Rasmussen's death in 2004, his wife, Lucy, as administratrix of his estate, ran the railroad. In December 2005, Chartwell International of Morristown, New Jersey signed an agreement with the Rasmussen estate to purchase majority control of the Cranberry Creek Railroad, holding company for the Middletown & New Jersey. In February 2006, Chartwell Corp. finished the acquisition of the railroad begun in December 2005, acquiring 100% ownership. The failing Chartwell sold the line to Regional Rail, LLC, headquartered in Kennett Square, Pa and began operations in April 2009.

When Regional Rail purchased the rail line it was in deep decline, but with NYS DOT grants and aggressive marketing, the line has made big advances. The old Agway Fertilizer site was converted to an inter-modal and trans-load site and now boasts of 4 regular customers. Commodities include beer, paper, lumber, fertilizer, wheat, barley, salt brine, potatoes and onions and of course its original mainstay plastics and chemicals and the occasional carnival train. The railroad recently leased NS lines that provided much needed additional operating revenue that saved 3 lines from abandonment. The railroad had the only through line connection operating after the mainline devastation after Hurricane Irene in 2011. Some MTA and NS trains were diverted over MNJ trackage and all local and through freight traffic was handled by them and the NYSW via the Campbell Hall cluster and yard.

== Facilities ==
=== Main line ===
The railway operates 43 miles (69 km) of track and interchanges with the Norfolk Southern Railway in Middletown and Campbell Hall, and the New York Susquehanna and Western Railroad in Warwick.

A New York State Department of Transportation grant of $750,000 was expected in fall 2007, and an additional $2 million was slated for 2009, to rehabilitate several additional miles of track in order to serve various potential industrial sites. Rehabilitation began in October 2010, after the damage done by hurricane Irene. In late August 2011, the MNJ was granted an additional $1.6 million by the state Department of Transportation for storm damage repairs and upgrades.

In 2010, the railroad filed a petition with the Surface Transportation Board to lease three branch lines and yards formerly operated by Norfolk Southern Railway. The M&NJ assumed operations and received trackage rights on the Walden and Maybrook industrials and the Hudson Secondary from Metro-North RR's Southern Tier Line at Campbell Hall to Warwick from Norfolk Southern on October 6, 2010, adding 40 miles of leased lines and trackage rights.

=== Buildings ===
The M&NJ's offices are located in Middletown, New York in a converted train station originally built in 1872, with an engine shed located immediately behind the station. Nearby is the more-modern engine house that stores the railroad's sole operating GP9 diesel-electric locomotive.

== Rolling stock ==
Road Number	Photo	Manufacturer	Model	Notes
2174		EMD	GP38-2	
2175		EMD	GP38-2	
5615		EMD	GP38-2	ex-NS 5615, painted black
773		EMD	GP9u	ex-Amtrak 773
1		GE	44-ton	scrapped July 2021
2		GE	44-ton	sold December 2021, on display in Port Jervis, NY

The line currently uses its locomotives to pull the rolling stock of other railroads. In the past, it has owned steam and diesel locomotives, as well as boxcars.

=== Steam locomotives ===
The railroad and its predecessors would roster a total of eight steam locomotives over the years, all bought second hand and none with a trailing truck. Three of these were camelback locomotives and the wheel arrangements included 4-4-0, 2-6-0, 4-6-0, and 2-8-0. The line's predecessor, the Middletown and Unionville Railroad (M&U), relied on the nearby New York, Ontario and Western shops for locomotive repairs and inspections and rented fifty-six different O&W locomotives in thirteen classes while its own was in the O&W shops. On April 23, 1944, the M&U retired the last railroad-owned steam locomotive and thereafter leased O&W locomotives and then NYS&W 2-10-0 "decapod" steam locomotives.

The M&NJ purchased former Bath and Hammondsport Railroad 2-6-0 11 in the 1980s with the intent of restoring it for freight service. However it sat stored until 2006 when it was sold to the owner of the Everett Railroad. It is currently undergoing restoration to active service at the shops of the Western Maryland Scenic Railroad. In 2015 after 9 years of restoration it returned to services.

During the 1960s when the Empire State Railway Museum was based out of Middletown, NY locomotive 103, a 2-6-2 from the Sumter & Choctaw Railroad was operated in excursion service between Middletown and Slate Hill, NY as the Middletown & Orange Railroad. This locomotive has since returned to the collection of the Railroad Museum of New England in Thomaston, Connecticut, where it is stored awaiting a possible restoration.

=== Diesel locomotives ===
The brand new General Electric 44-ton switcher #1 arrived April 19, 1946. Three of the M&U's feed customers had purchased the diesel on behalf of the railroad. The O&W maintained M&NJ #1 and loaned its own 44-tonners, 101 and 105, when #1 was in their shop.

In 1963, the M&NJ purchased a second GE 44-tonner #2 from Calco Chemical of Bound Brook, New Jersey. M&NJ #2 was the railway's sole operating unit from about 1981 into July 2007. The #2 was leased to an East Penn Railroad customer in Pennsylvania, while the original 44-tonner #1 was stored inoperative in the Middletown engine house. The #1 was slated for restoration; however, the October 2021 issue of Railfan & Railroad magazine reported that it was scrapped in late July 2021 in Middletown along with two other GE locomotives. The #2 was sold in late 2021 to the non-profit Operation Toy Train of New York, Inc. (now renamed TOYX, Inc.) and moved to display at the Erie Turntable in Port Jervis, New York. The #2 is currently the only preserved piece of M&NJ rolling stock, and is undergoing a long-term operational restoration. The M&NJ donated many of the remaining parts from #1 to TOYX in April 2024 to aid in #2's restoration.

Current power is provided primarily by EMD GP38-2's 2174, 2175, and 5615 (which was recently acquired from Norfolk Southern). Additional power includes a Canadian-built EMD GP9u (formerly Amtrak) 773 which arrived in July 2007. The railroad has also leased GE B30-7 ESPN 7811 and GE B23-7 ESPN 5114 from its sister company, East Penn on October 1, 2010.

=== Railroad cars ===
Because it is a short-line railroad, the M&NJ does not ordinarily own or lease many railway cars. However, in the late 1970s, the M&NJ rostered 500 blue boxcars 50 feet (15 m) in length leased from NRUC, the National Railway Utilization Company. The cars were loaded with finished goods at Polytherm, then spent much of their time hauling loads in interchange service throughout the U.S. and Canada while the M&NJ collected 10% of the usage fees they generated. The boom in incentive per diem (IPD) boxcars ended by the early 1980s and the cars returned to the M&NJ which opened 2 miles (3.2 km) of unused track to store the cars until buyers could be found, a task which took almost a decade.

== See also ==
- List of New York railroads
