= Starkey, Oregon =

Unincorporated community in the state of Oregon, United States

Coordinates: 45°13′17″N 118°25′33″W

Starkey is an unincorporated community in Union County, Oregon, United States, about 26 miles southwest of La Grande. It is about two miles south of Oregon Route 244 in the Blue Mountains.

Starkey's post office was established in 1879 and named after the first postmaster, John Starkey, who settled in the area in the 1870s. The originally proposed name, Daleyville, was rejected. The post office closed in 1935.

Starkey was the headquarters of the Mount Emily Lumber Company. The population was 50 in 1919 and 75 in 1931. The town went through a significant population boom by 1940 because of a portable logging operation, but the townsite was liquidated by the Valsetz Lumber Company in 1955. Today Starkey has a store and a cemetery.
