= MNJ =

MNJ may refer to:

- Niger Movement for Justice, a rebel group in Niger
- Munji language, a language of Afghanistan
- Middletown and New Jersey Railroad, reporting mark
