= Johnson, New York =

- Hamlet
- Location within New York Location within the United States
- Coordinates: 41°21′58″N 74°30′24″W
- Country: United States
- State: New York
- County: Orange
- Elevation: 509 ft (155 m)
- Time zone: UTC-5 (Eastern (EST))
  - Summer (DST): UTC-4 (EDT)
- ZIP code: 10933
- Area code: 845
- GNIS feature ID: 954102

Johnson is a hamlet in the Town of Minisink in Orange County, New York, United States. The community is located near New York State Route 284 and is 7 miles (11 km) southwest of Middletown. Johnson has a post office with ZIP code 10933.
