= Westtown, New York =

Westtown
- Hamlet
- Location within New York
- Coordinates: 41°20′12.34″N 74°32′23.58″W
- Country: United States
- State: New York
- County: Orange
- Time zone: UTC-5 (EST)
  - Summer (DST): UTC-4 (EDT)
- ZIP Code: 10998

Westtown is a hamlet in Orange County, in the U.S. state of New York. It is located along New York State Route 284 north of Unionville and Minisink, and north of the New Jersey state border.

== History ==
A post office called West Town was established in 1816, the name was changed to Westtown in 1894, and the post office remains in operation. The community was named for its location on the west side of the town of Minisink.
