= New York State Route 284 =

State highway in Orange County, New York, US

New York State Route 284
- Map of Orange County with NY 284 highlighted in red

Route information
- Maintained by NYSDOT
- Length: 9.01 mi (14.50 km)
- Existed: May 1966–present

Major junctions
- South end: Route 284 at the New Jersey state line in Unionville
- North end: US 6 in Wawayanda

Location
- Country: United States
- State: New York
- Counties: Orange

Highway system
- New York Highways; Interstate; US; State; Reference; Parkways
← NY 283	→ NY 285
← I-84	NY 84	→ NY 85

New York State Route 284 (NY 284) is a north–south state highway located entirely within Orange County, New York, in the United States. It begins just south of the village of Unionville at the New Jersey state line in the town of Minisink, where it connects to that state's Route 284. From Unionville, the route heads through rural parts of Orange County for just over 9 miles (14 km) to an intersection with U.S. Route 6 (US 6) in the hamlet of Slate Hill, located 5 miles (8.0 km) southwest of the city of Middletown in the town of Wawayanda.

The highway has been part of a state route since 1924 when it became part of New York State Route 8, a road continuing northeast through Middletown and Montgomery to Newburgh. NY 8 was split into two routes as part of the 1930 renumbering of state highways in New York, with the portion of the highway south of Montgomery becoming New York State Route 84. When Interstate 84 (I-84) was built along a similar alignment to NY 84 in the mid-1960s, the state route was renumbered again in May 1966 to prevent confusion between the two roads. The section of NY 84 south of Slate Hill was redesignated as NY 284 while the rest of the highway was absorbed by other, pre-existing routes.

== Route description ==
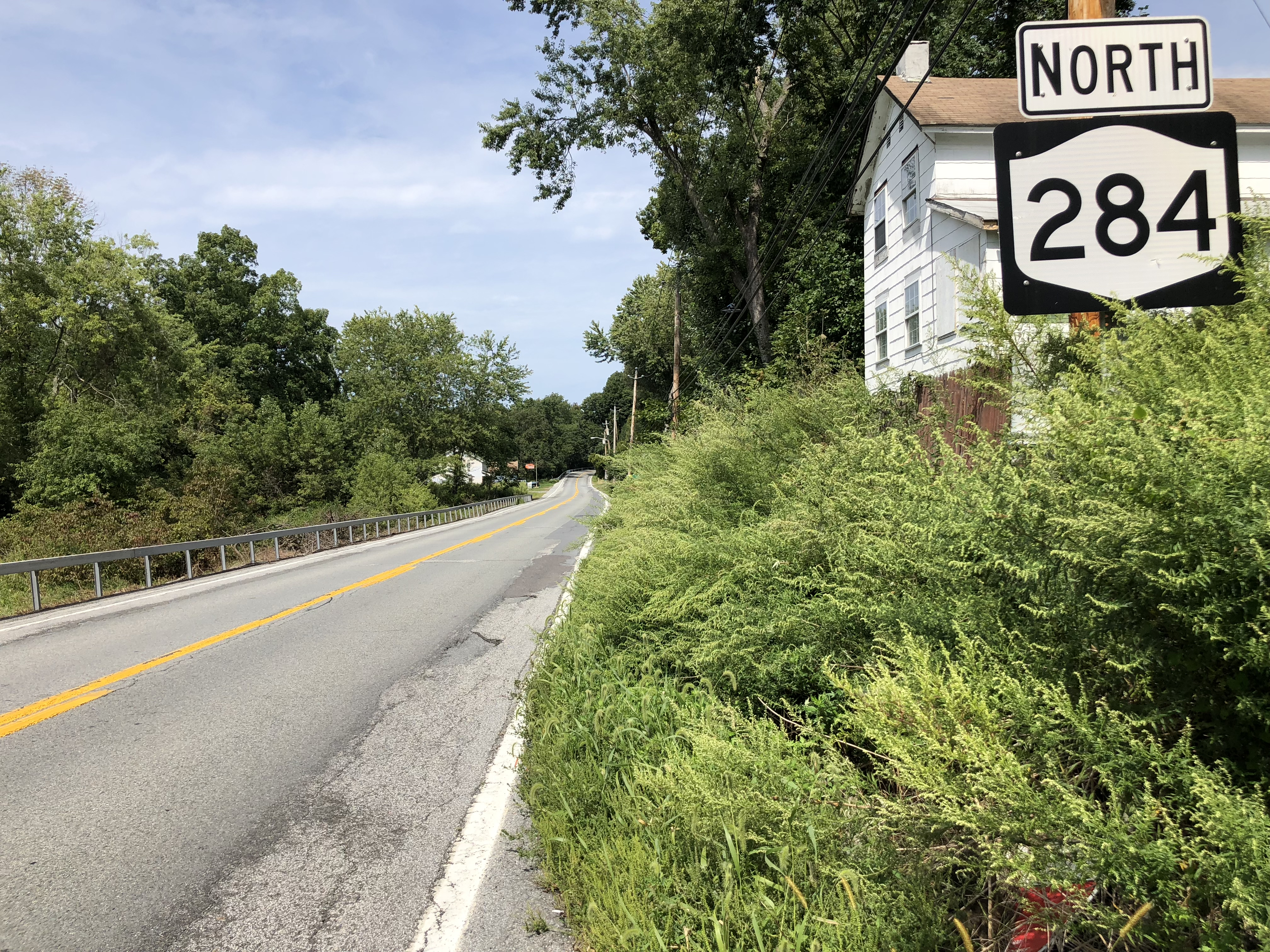
NY 284 northbound past its southern terminus at Route 284 at the New Jersey border in Minisink

NY 284 begins at the New Jersey state line in the town of Minisink as a northerly continuation of that state's Route 284. The route heads northwest for a short distance into the village of Unionville, where it serves as the main thoroughfare through the community. In the center of the village, the highway reaches an intersection with County Route 36 (CR 36, named Main Street), which heads west to the New Jersey state line and becomes CR 651 upon entering Sussex County. NY 284 turns north at this junction, passing a handful of homes before bending to the northwest and leaving the village limits for less developed areas of Minisink.

Outside of Unionville, the route slowly bends to the northeast, paralleling the former right-of-way of the Middletown and New Jersey Railroad (MNJ) as it runs northwest through farmlands. At the far eastern end of the hamlet of Waterloo Mills, the highway also begins to follow Rutgers Creek. The waterway, the former railroad right-of-way and the road take similar paths to the hamlet of Westtown, where NY 284 serves as the main north–south route through the community. It passes Lockenhurst Pond in the southern part of the hamlet before meeting CR 1 near Art Fords Lake. Past Westtown, NY 284 winds its way northeastward across another rural part of Minisink, intersecting CR 62 and CR 22 at back-to-back junctions near the northern town line. The latter route provides access to the hamlet of Johnson, which NY 284 bypasses to the southeast.

North of CR 22, Rutgers Creek merges with Indigot Creek, a small stream forming part of the Minisink–Wawayanda town line. The combined stream continues to serve as the boundary between the two towns as Rutgers Creek takes on a southeasterly course from this point. NY 284 crosses over the waterway, entering Wawayanda and connecting to CR 93 (Lime Kiln Road) just north of the town line. From CR 93, the highway runs northeastward across open, rolling terrain, following an active part of the MNJ Railroad to the hamlet of Slate Hill. NY 284 ends in the center of the community at a junction with US 6.

== History ==
New York State Route 84
- Location: New Jersey state line–Montgomery
- Existed: 1930–May 1966

Modern NY 284 was gradually acquired by the state of New York over the course of the early 20th century. The first stretch to be added to the state highway system was the section between the northern village line of Unionville and the hamlet of Slate Hill, which was improved by the state under a contract awarded on June 18, 1904. Work to bring the existing highway up to state highway standards cost $50,879 (equivalent to $1.82 million in 2025), and the rebuilt road was taken over by the state on December 19, 1906. It was designated but not signed as State Highway 160 (SH 160). A contract to improve the highway's continuation to the New Jersey state line south of Unionville was awarded on June 19, 1922, and the highway was reconstructed and taken over by the state by 1926 as SH 500.

When the first set of posted routes in New York were assigned in 1924, SH 160 and SH 500 became the westernmost portion of NY 8, which continued northeast to Newburgh by way of Middletown and Montgomery. In the 1930 renumbering of state highways in New York, the NY 8 designation was reassigned to another highway serving the Central New York Region and the North Country. The portion of its former alignment east of Montgomery became part of the new NY 215 while the rest was renumbered to NY 84. Another, much smaller renumbering was carried out in May 1966 after I-84 was built along an alignment similar to that of NY 84. To prevent confusion between the two nearby roads, the section of NY 84 south of Slate Hill was renumbered to NY 284 while the part east of Middletown became an extension of NY 211. From Slate Hill to Middletown, the road remained part of US 6 and NY 17M, which NY 84 had previously overlapped.

== Major intersections ==
The entire route is in Orange County.

Location	mi	km	Destinations	Notes
Minisink	0.00	0.00	Route 284 south	Continuation into New Jersey
Wawayanda	9.01	14.50	US 6	Northern terminus; hamlet of Slate Hill
1.000 mi = 1.609 km; 1.000 km = 0.621 mi
