= Minisink Angle =

The Minisink Angle was an angle created in a patent boundary during the 18th century, mostly within the present borders of Orange and Ulster counties in southeastern New York State. In creating this boundary adjustment, the proprietors of the 1704 Minisink Patent attempted to expand their patent boundary northeastward, at the expense of those with an interest in the adjacent 1694 Evans Patent, which had been resumed (reclaimed) by the English crown and was being subdivided by the colonial governors into grants to prospective settlers and investors. The lands of the Evans Patent had in turn originated as two large, contiguous tracts purchased by Governor Thomas Dongan in 1684-85 from the Esopus Indians and the Murderer's Creek tribe.

== Litigation ==
The boundary disputes resulting from the Minisink proprietors' actions resulted in extensive litigation during the 18th century. These disputes were important in the context of colonial landholdings and were argued at the highest levels of colonial government. They also resulted in the amassing of a sizeable documentary record useful to later historians in exploring questions concerning the true boundaries of the Evans Patent (Dongan purchases) and in shedding light on various other historical matters.

There were actually two Minisink Angles: the first in 1711 and the second, bolder expansion in 1765, which included and enlarged upon the earlier one. The painfully contrived geographical logic used to justify these attempted land grabs led to the eventual demise of the Minisink proprietors' grander ambitions.

== Documentation ==
The story of these machinations, set in the larger context of solving the mystery of the Evans Patent's original southwest bounds, is presented by Marc B. Fried, who provides extensive documentation from items in the NYS Archives and the archives of the New-York Historical Society as well as from other sources, both published and archival.

== See also ==
- Minisink, New York
- Minisink Ford, New York
