= Unionville, Orange County, New York =

Unionville
- Village
- Village of Unionville
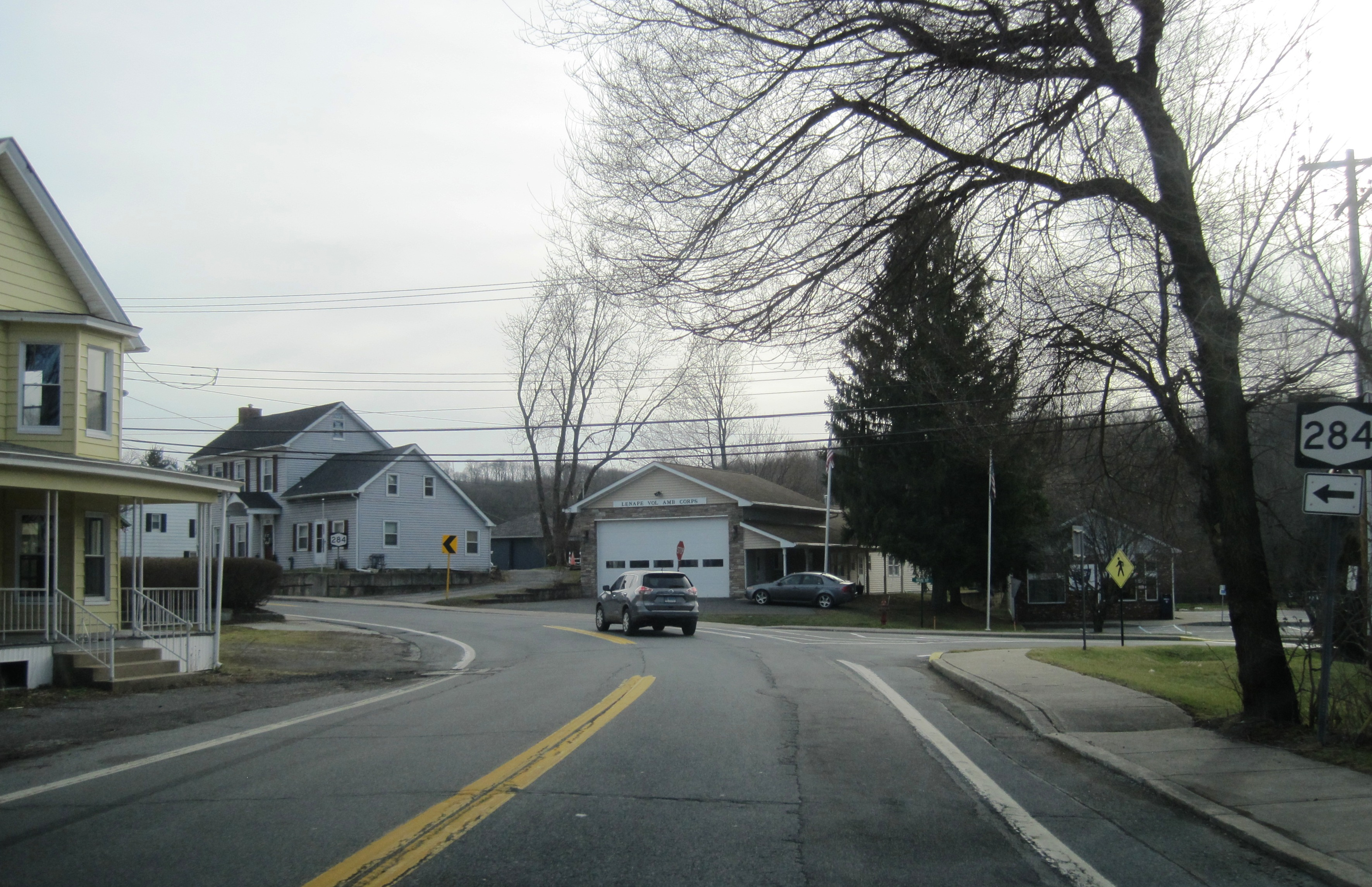
- Center of Unionville along NY 284

- Location in Orange County and the state of New York.

- Location within the state of New York
- Coordinates: 41°18′1″N 74°33′42″W
- Country: United States
- State: New York
- County: Orange
- Incorporated: 1871

Area
  - Total: 0.31 sq mi (0.79 km^{2})
  - Land: 0.31 sq mi (0.79 km^{2})
  - Water: 0 sq mi (0.00 km^{2})

Population (2020)
  - Total: 592
  - Density: 1,936.2/sq mi (747.58/km^{2})
- Time zone: UTC-5 (Eastern (EST))
  - Summer (DST): UTC-4 (EDT)
- Area code: 845
- FIPS code: 36-76210
- GNIS feature ID: 2391176
- Website: www.unionvilleny.org

Unionville is a village in Orange County, New York, United States. The population was 592 at the 2020 census, making it by far the smallest village in Orange County and one of the smallest in New York State.

The village is within the town of Minisink, southeast of Port Jervis, and is part of the Kiryas Joel-Poughkeepsie-Newburgh metropolitan statistical area as well as the larger New York City-Newark, New Jersey-Bridgeport, Connecticut and New York-New Jersey-Connecticut-Pennsylvania combined statistical area.

== History ==
The settlement was founded in the early part of the 18th century, and became known as Unionville around 1820. According to tradition, the name "Unionville" was applied to the place after a land dispute had been settled. Unionville was incorporated as a village in 1871. Once an important economic zone in the area, its decline followed the changes in transportation which favored other locations: the Middletown and Unionville Railroad shuttled agricultural products (especially milk) as well as high school students in the first half of the 20th century. By World War II, however, improved roads and a high school built far away from the train tracks led to the end of these services; passenger service on the line ended in 1968.

== Geography ==
Unionville is located at 41°18′1″N 74°33′42″W.

According to the United States Census Bureau, the village has a total area of 0.2 square mile (0.6 km^{2}), all land.

The village is located on NY Route 284. The Appalachian Trail runs just south of the village along the New York/New Jersey state line. Unionville is adjacent to the Town of Wantage in New Jersey.

== Demographics ==
Historical population
Census	Pop.	Note	%±
1880	316		—
1890	316		0.0%
1900	454		43.7%
1910	351		−22.7%
1920	402		14.5%
1930	438		9.0%
1940	387		−11.6%
1950	454		17.3%
1960	511		12.6%
1970	576		12.7%
1980	574		−0.3%
1990	548		−4.5%
2000	536		−2.2%
2010	612		14.2%
2020	592		−3.3%
U.S. Decennial Census

As of the census of 2000, there were 536 people, 197 households, and 140 families residing in the village. The population density was 2,140.2 inhabitants per square mile (826.3/km^{2}). There were 210 housing units at an average density of 838.5 per square mile (323.7/km^{2}). The racial makeup of the village was 95.34% white, .37% African American, .37% Pacific Islander, 2.24% from other races, and 1.68% from two or more races. Hispanic or Latino of any race were 8.21% of the population.

There were 197 households, out of which 36.5% had children under the age of 18 living with them, 52.8% were married couples living together, 12.2% had a female householder with no husband present, and 28.9% were non-families. 22.3% of all households were made up of individuals, and 5.6% had someone living alone who was 65 years of age or older. The average household size was 2.70 and the average family size was 3.16.

The population of the village was spread out, with 26.3% under the age of 18, 6% from 18 to 24, 31.7% from 25 to 44, 25.7% from 45 to 64, and 10.3% who were 65 years of age or older. The median age was 38 years. For every 100 females, there were 88.7 males. For every 100 females age 18 and over, there were 87.2 males.

The median income for a household in the village was $37,222, and the median income for a family was $41,000. Males had a median income of $31,250 versus $30,000 for females. The per capita income for the village was $16,753. About 7.0% of families and 8.4% of the population were below the poverty line, including 6.3% of those under age 18 and none of those age 65 or over.
