= Independence, Washington =

- Unincorporated community
- Interactive map of Independence, Washington
- Coordinates: 46°47′56″N 123°09′19″W
- Country: United States
- State: Washington
- County: Thurston
- Time zone: UTC-8 (Pacific (PST))
  - Summer (DST): UTC-7 (PDT)

Independence is an unincorporated community in Thurston County, in the U.S. state of Washington. The area is situated on the Chehalis River and is approximately southeast of Chehalis Village.

== History ==
Independence had a post office from 1878 until 1890, and again from 1911 until 1944, when it was discontinued.
