= Mount Emily Lumber Company =

American lumber company (1920-1956)

- Industry: Lumber
- Founded: 1920
- Defunct: 1956
- Fate: Defunct
- Headquarters: La Grande, Oregon, United States

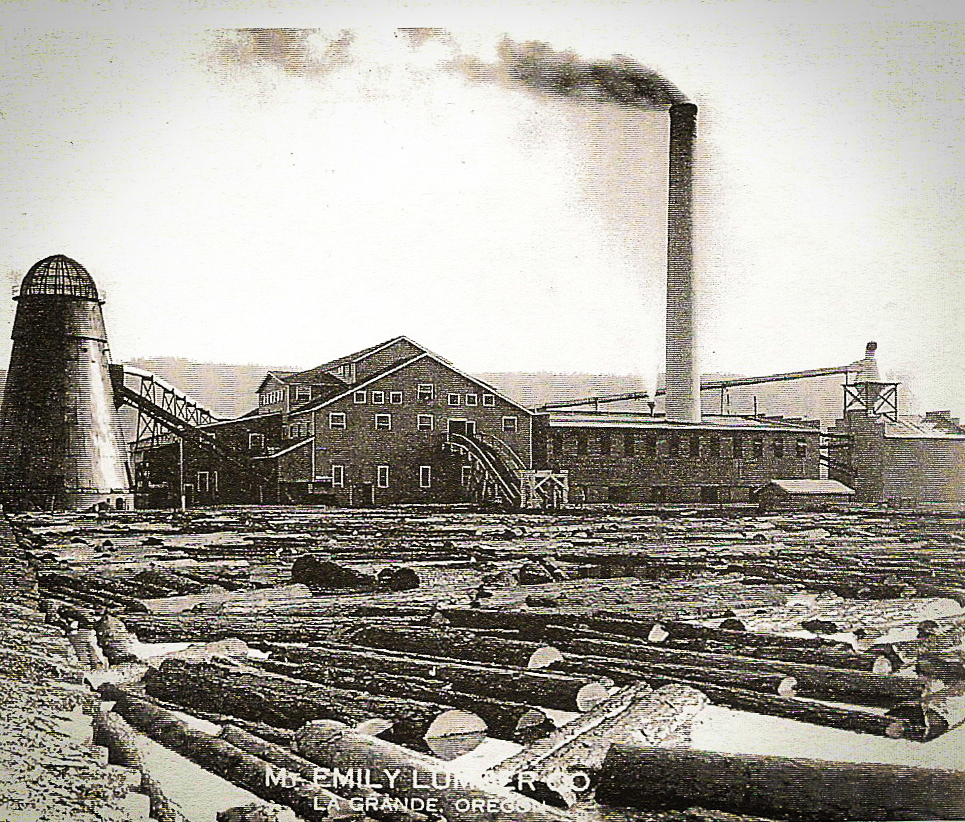
Early 1920s photograph of the Mount Emily Lumber Company.

The Mount Emily Lumber Company operated in La Grande, Oregon from 1920 until 1956. After becoming a subsidiary of the Valsetz Lumber Company in 1955, the name was changed to Templeton Lumber Company. In 1960, the company was again sold and the name changed to Boise Cascade, La Grande. In 2018 the mill was sold and is currently operated by "Woodgrain"

== History ==
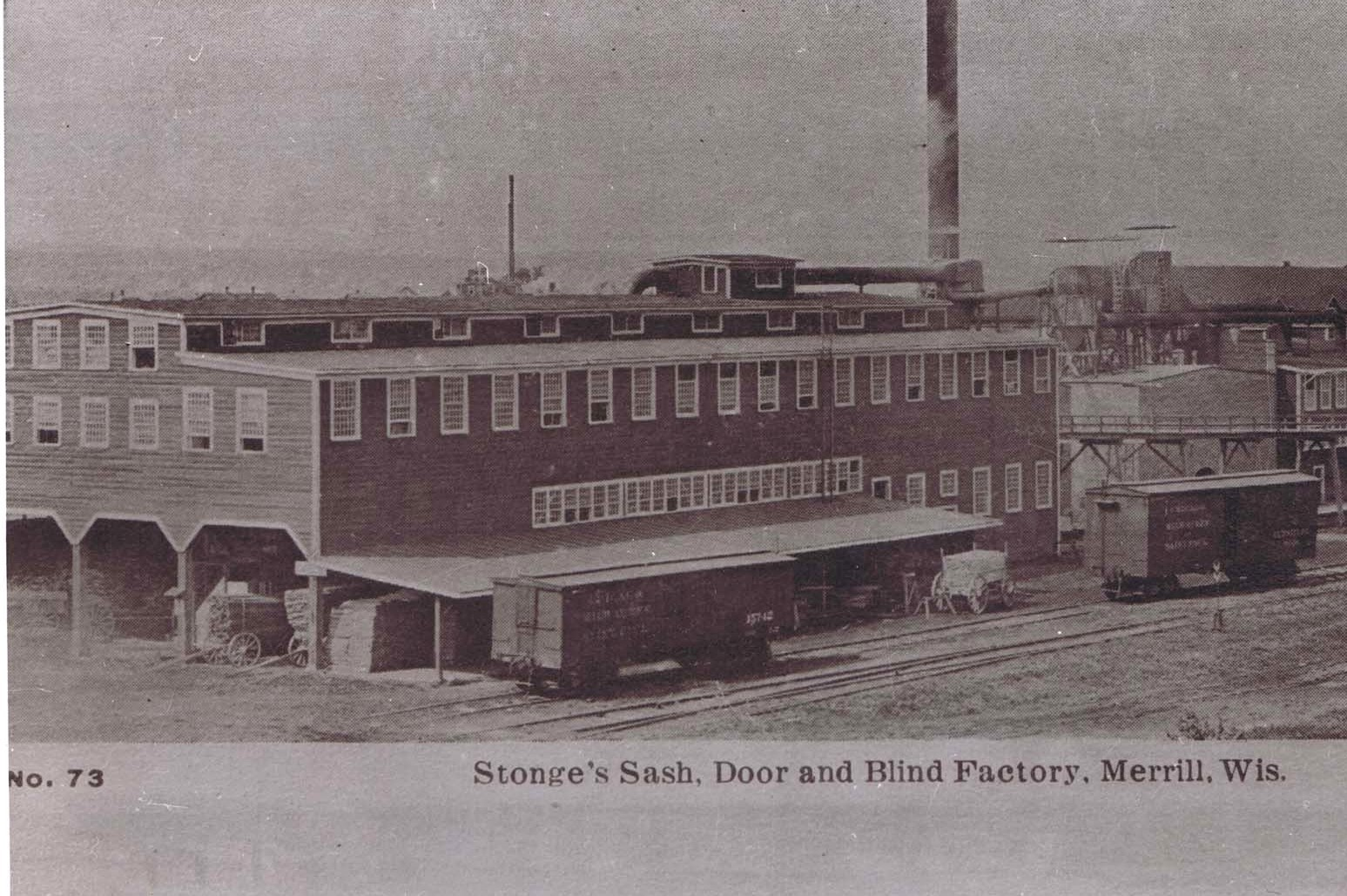
Stange's Sash, Door and Blind Factory in Merrill, Wisconsin.

Early in the 20th century August H. Stange, owner of the Stange Sash, Door, and Blind Company in Merrill, Wisconsin, began to understand that the forests around Merrill could no longer support his need for lumber. For economic reasons, loggers had clear-cut their land without reforestation, and the demand for timber was approaching its supply. On average, the Merrill plant needed 125,000 board feet of lumber each day. Stange may also have known that the United States Forest Service had begun to award large timber contracts to lumber companies in the Pacific Northwest. For example, the Oregon Lumber Company would soon receive an award of sale of 124 million board feet of lumber in 1916.

Stange had been impressed with the quality of Pacific Northwest lumber that arrived by Union Pacific railroad, and in 1910 he and his son, August J. Stange, ventured west to survey the forests around Mt. Emily in Eastern Oregon.

With his father's money, A. J. Stange formed the Mt. Emily Timber Co. and purchased in excess of 100,000 acres of forest land, estimated to contain over one billion board feet of lumber. He lived in La Grande, Oregon until 1913. During that time he prepared to build a sawmill with access to the Union Pacific railroad. From there he would send lumber by rail to his father's door and sash company. When his land acquisitions had concluded, Stange returned to Wisconsin to continue work in his father's business interests. He owned a land speculation company and worked for the Charles Kinzel Logging Company, owned by his brother-in-law, until 1920. In that year he returned to La Grande and created the Mount Emily Lumber Company from the assets of the Mt. Emily Timber Co.

The company officers were

- August J. Stange, President (President and General Manager of the Union Land Co. of Merril, WI, Officer of Charles Kinzel Lumber Co., and son of August H. Stange)
- August H. Stange (father of August J. Stange, owner of Stange Sash, Door, and Blind Co. and officer of the First National Bank of Eagle River, Wisconsin)
- Charles H. Stange (vice president of Stange Sash, Door, and Blind Co. and son of August H. Stange)
- Charles J. Kinzel (owner of Charles Kinzel Logging Co. and son-in-law of August H. Stange)
- Leslie K. Kinzel (son of Charles J. Kinzel)
- E. W. Ellis (President of Wisconsin-Michigan Lumber Co., president of the First National Bank of Eagle River, Wisconsin, and son-in-law of August H. Stange).

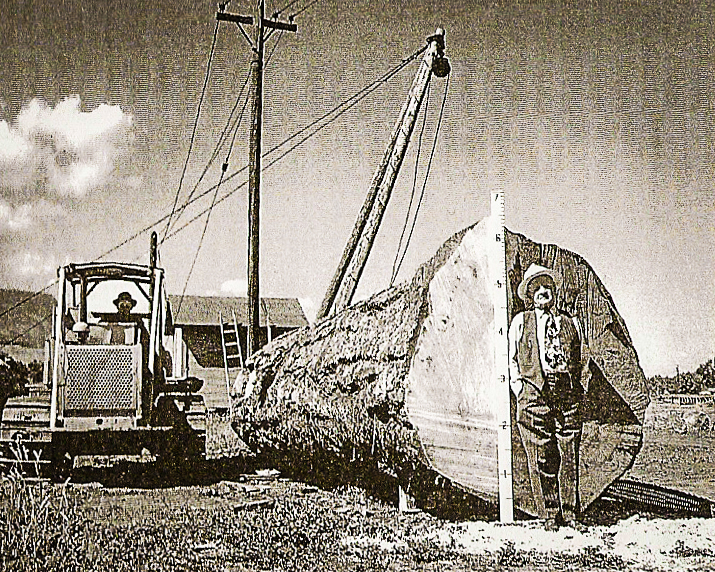
August Stange stands next to a log at the Mount Emily Lumber Company, 1922.

Only August J. Stange and Leslie K. Kinzel relocated to Oregon when the new company began. The other officers remained in Wisconsin.

The sawmill was sited next to La Grande's failed sugar mill, part of the Amalgamated Sugar Company. The first log entered the mill on November 15, 1925.

The log pond of the new lumber company leached various toxins, and nearby residents complained for years that they could taste the log pond in their drinking water.

In 1925 the company purchased The Grande Ronde Lumber Co. and its short-line railroad. Railroad access enabled the movement of logs from Mt. Emily to the sawmill in La Grande.

The rated capacity of the new sawmill was 50,000,000 board feet per year. By comparison, the Wisconsin-Michigan Lumber Co. milled about 15,000,000 board feet per year.

Charles Kinzel continued his logging operations in Wisconsin for a time, ending his own rail operations in 1926 and closing his sawmill in 1930. The 1939 Polk Directory placed him in La Grande and revealed that he had become president of the Mount Emily Lumber Company. Former president August J. Stange had been demoted to vice president. Upon the death of Kinzel in 1942, Stange was once again named president of the company.

== The Camas Creek timber sale ==
In 1930 the Forest Service began mapping the Mount Emily Lumber Company holdings in the Umatilla National Forest. The Forest Service anticipated a purchase application by the company for over 221,000,000 board feet of lumber and began a survey of sites in the Umatilla National Forest and the Wallowa–Whitman National Forest. A Forest Service prospectus was prepared in 1937 that contained many confidential financial records of the company, including a description of the short line railroad and revenue and expense information. Armed with this information, the Milton Box Company of Milton, Oregon was able to outbid Mount Emily Lumber Co. by over $35,000 and subsequently received the contract. The Milton Box Company moved to Pendleton, Oregon and received pre-arranged free land from city leaders and an incentive of $10,000 cash. After many public protests and an investigation, no criminal charges were filed.

== Sale to Valsetz Lumber Company ==
In January, 1955, Stange announced that Valsetz Lumber Company had bought all of the corporate shares for an undisclosed amount. In February, the Stange's celebrated their 50th wedding anniversary.

Valsetz immediately increased wages and production. The mill closed 1955 with 58,000,000 board feet of lumber shipped, up 22,000,000 from 1954. Valsetz also shut down the short line railroad, which had become more expensive to operate than a fleet of logging trucks.

== Camp Elkanah ==
In November, 1956, Valsetz donated Mount Emily's main logging camp to the Blue Mountain Conservative Baptist Association of Eastern Oregon. The camp included residences and other structures plus 12 acres of forest.

== The Mount Emily Shay steam locomotive in Prineville ==
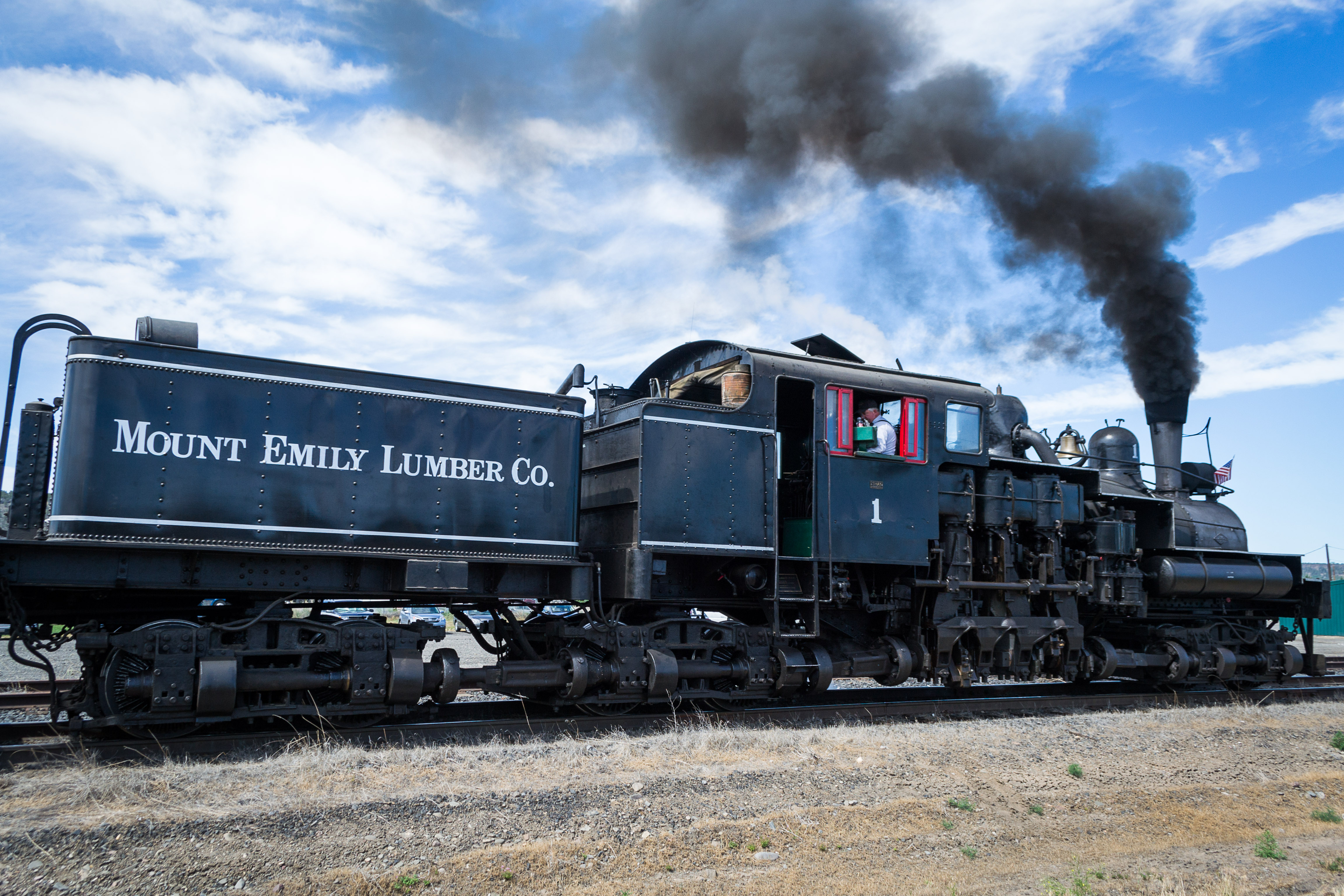
The Prineville Railroad Shay originally owned by the Mount Emily Lumber Company.

Since the beginning of the Mount Emily Lumber Company, logs were transported down the mountain behind a Shay steam locomotive on a short line railroad. This practice was common in the logging industry until the development of more powerful log trucks and better logging roads. Mount Emily owned four Shays, and after Valsetz bought the company and began hauling with trucks, one engine was donated to the Oregon Museum of Science and Industry. From there it was donated to the Oregon Historical Society, and through a lease agreement the Shay is operated by the City of Prineville Railroad.
