= Minisink, New York =

- Town
- Town of Minisink
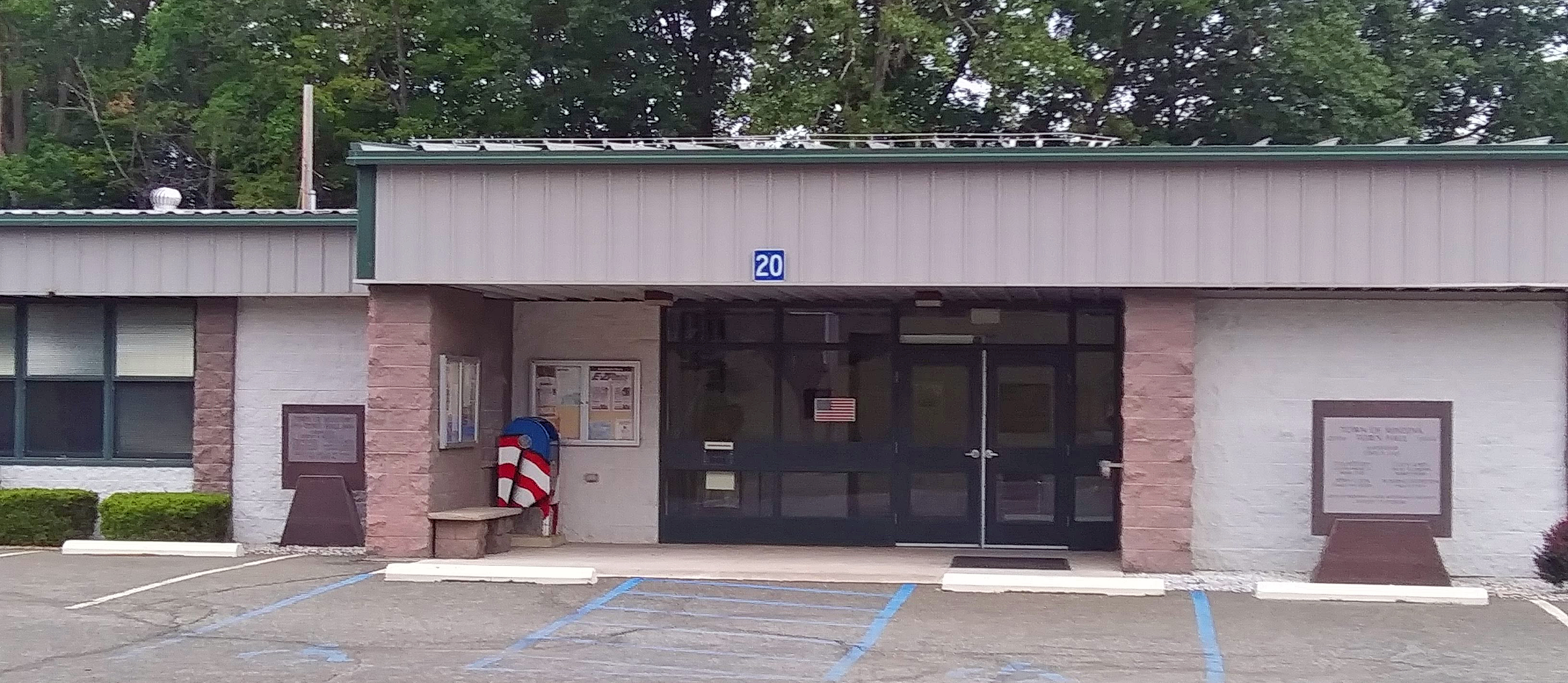
- Town hall

- Location in Orange County and the state of New York.

- Location within the state of New York
- Coordinates: 41°20′N 74°32′W
- Country: United States
- State: New York
- County: Orange

Area
  - Total: 23.15 sq mi (59.95 km^{2})
  - Land: 23.00 sq mi (59.57 km^{2})
  - Water: 0.14 sq mi (0.37 km^{2})
- Elevation: 554 ft (169 m)

Population (2020)
  - Total: 4,621
  - Density: 200.9/sq mi (77.57/km^{2})
- Time zone: UTC-5 (EST)
  - Summer (DST): UTC-4 (EDT)
- FIPS code: 36-47713
- GNIS feature ID: 0979226
- Website: www.townofminisink.com

Minisink is a town located in southwestern Orange County, New York, United States, northeast of the New Jersey border between the Town of Greenville and the Town of Warwick. The population was 4,621 at the 2020 census. The town is located near Interstate 84 and New York State Route 17 and lies approximately halfway between New York City and Scranton, Pennsylvania. Minisink is one of the oldest settlements in the region, with its origins tracing back to the early eighteenth century and the Minisink Patent, a significant colonial land grant.

== History ==
The name Minisink is derived from the language of its original inhabitants, the Munsee. Its use dates to the mid-seventeenth century and historically applied to a large area traditionally bounded north-to-south by the Minisink Ford and Delaware Water Gap, and east-to-west by the Kittatinny Ridge and Pocono Mountains (See ). The Minisink Patent, granted in 1704, established a defined plot within this broader area. The current municipal borders were fixed in 1800. Due to the fact that the New York - New Jersey border was previously seven or eight miles north of its present location, Minisink was once in New Jersey.

First settled by Europeans around 1725, the jurisdiction was organized by Americans as a town in 1788 following the Revolutionary War. In the following decades, the Town of Minisink lost territory to newer towns: Deerpark (1798), Wawayanda (1849), and Greenville (1853). In 1871, the community of Unionville set itself off from the town by incorporating as a village.

== Geography ==
According to the United States Census Bureau, the town has a total area of 23.2 square miles (60 km^{2}), of which 23.1 square miles (60 km^{2}) is land and 0.1 square miles (0.26 km^{2}) (0.39%) is water.

The southern town line is the border of New Jersey (Sussex County).

NY-284 is a north–south highway in Minisink.

== Demographics ==
Historical population
Census	Pop.	Note	%±
1820	5,053		—
1830	4,979		−1.5%
1840	5,093		2.3%
1850	4,972		−2.4%
1860	1,266		−74.5%
1870	1,443		14.0%
1880	1,360		−5.8%
1890	1,269		−6.7%
1900	1,505		18.6%
1910	1,304		−13.4%
1920	1,252		−4.0%
1930	1,360		8.6%
1940	1,343		−1.2%
1950	1,367		1.8%
1960	1,433		4.8%
1970	1,942		35.5%
1980	2,488		28.1%
1990	2,981		19.8%
2000	3,585		20.3%
2010	4,490		25.2%
2020	4,621		2.9%
U.S. Decennial Census

As of the census of 2000, there were 3,585 people, 1,182 households, and 945 families residing in the town. The population density was 155.2 inhabitants per square mile (59.9/km^{2}). There were 1,245 housing units at an average density of 53.9 per square mile (20.8/km^{2}). The racial makeup of the town was 89.00% white, 1.42% African American, 0.03% Native American, 0.59% Asian, 0.06% Pacific Islander, 1.03% from other races, and 0.92% from two or more races. Hispanic or Latino of any race were 10.60% of the population.

There were 1,182 households, out of which 44.8% had children under the age of 18 living with them, 69.3% were married couples living together, 7.6% had a female householder with no husband present, and 20.0% were non-families. 15.9% of all households were made up of individuals, and 6.2% had someone living alone who was 65 years of age or older. The average household size was 3.02 and the average family size was 3.39.

In the town, the population was spread out, with 29.8% under the age of 18, 6.3% from 18 to 24, 31.3% from 25 to 44, 24.3% from 45 to 64, and 8.3% who were 65 years of age or older. The median age was 36 years. For every 100 females, there were 97.3 males. For every 100 females age 18 and over, there were 95.2 males.

The median income for a household in the town was $55,561, and the median income for a family was $58,906. Males had a median income of $36,912 versus $28,750 for females. The per capita income for the town was $20,967. About 4.5% of families and 5.8% of the population were below the poverty line, including 6.8% of those under age 18 and 3.7% of those age 65 or over.

== Government ==
Since January 1, 1980, the town is governed by a town board consisting of four councilmen, elected for staggered four-year terms, and a town supervisor, elected every two years. Prior to 1980, the town justices also served on the board, alongside two councilmen, and the supervisor. Minisink is governed under New York town law, by which the board holds executive and legislative powers. The day-to-day operations of the town are administered by the supervisor. The town voters also elect a town clerk, two town justices, a tax collector and a highway superintendent. Town elections are held on the Tuesday after the first Monday in November in odd-numbered calendar years. Elected officials take office the following January 1. Prior to the 1980s, Minisink also elected three assessors. Those functions are now performed by a sole assessor appointed by the town board.

=== Federal, state, and county representation ===
The town of Minisink lies in the 18th Congressional district, the 42nd State Senate district, the 98th State Assembly district, and the 3rd Orange County legislative district.

== Education ==
- Minisink Valley Central School District

== Communities and locations in Minisink ==
- Johnson – a hamlet near the northern town line on NY-284.
- Laurel Hill – an elevation in the eastern part of Minisink.
- Millsburg – a location near the northern town line.
- Unionville – village near the New Jersey border on highway NY-284.
- Waterloo Mills – a hamlet northwest of Westtown.
- Westtown – a hamlet north of Unionville on NY-284 on County Road 1.
