= City of Prineville Railway =

Shortline railroad in Oregon, U.S.

Coordinates: 44.3036°N 120.8455°W

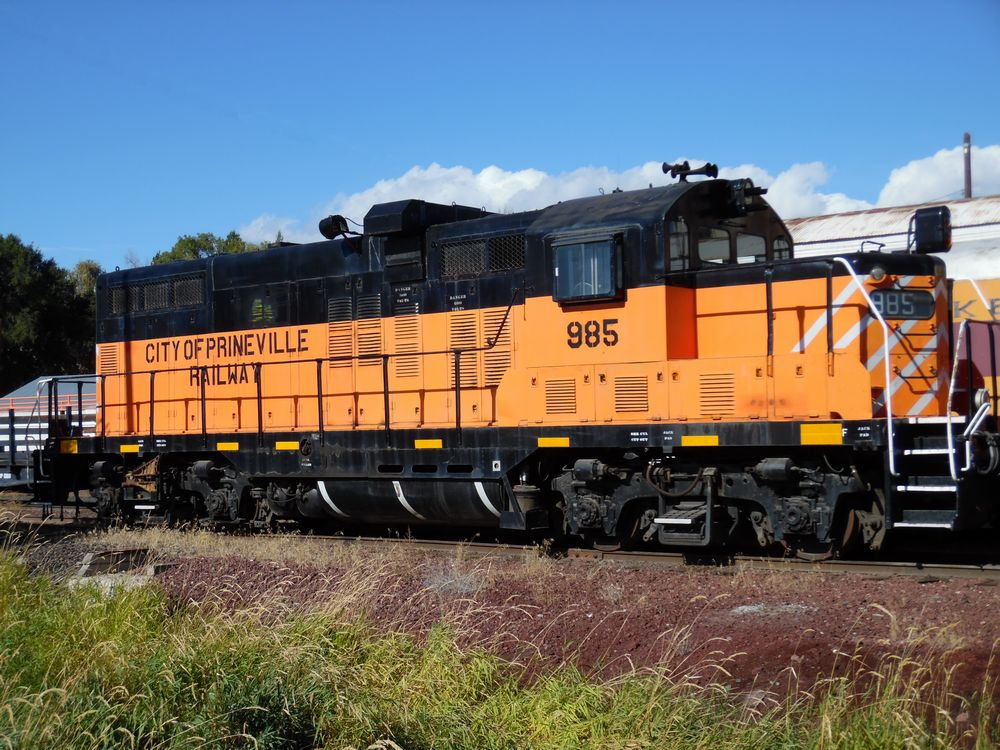
- Engine 985 on siding in Prineville

Overview
- Headquarters: Prineville, Oregon
- Reporting mark: COP
- Locale: Central Oregon
- Dates of operation: March 1913–present

Technical
- Track gauge: 4 ft 8 1/2 in (1,435 mm)
- Length: 18-mile (29 km)

Other
- Website: https://www.cityofprineville.com/railway

The City of Prineville Railway (reporting mark COP) is an 18-mile (29 km) class III shortline railroad connecting the U.S. cities of Prineville and Redmond, Oregon. Trains can connect with the BNSF and UPRR at Prineville Jct. 3 miles north of Redmond, Oregon.

== History ==
The railroad had its origins in the late 1800s, when the city of Prineville was bypassed by the Oregon Trunk Railroad, resulting in the city losing business to nearby towns that did have railroad service, such as Bend. After two failed attempts in the early 1910s, the city decided to take matters into its own hands and in 1916 chartered a railroad. The line opened in 1918. After struggling early on, the railroad eventually was able to gain new customers in the sawmills that opened up near Prineville to take advantage of the recently opened timber of the Ochoco Mountains east of the city. In 1939, two significant events took place on the COP. First, the railroad was able to finally turn its first profit and second, the railroad terminated its passenger service, which had been declining since the early 1920s. The railroad joined the diesel age in 1950 when it purchased its first diesel locomotive, and in 1955 it scrapped the last of its steam locomotives.

The railroad stabilized in the 1960s and 1970s with four sawmills as customers, but by the 1990s and 2000s, the railroad lost revenue when the final two mills being served shut down, leaving the COP with only inbound lumber loads for the Woodgrain Millworks facility. In 2004, business picked back up when the railroad built a transload facility out of an abandoned sawmill. This facility had garnered the attention of Louisiana Pacific (LP) who used it to receive wood for laminated beams and ship out completed beams. Both the raw goods received and the finished product would be shipped by truck either to or from an LP facility in Hines. While this did help the COP, it would turn out to be short lived as LP eventually had to close the Hines plant. Today the railroad still serves Prineville and several of its industries and it also remains one of the oldest municipally built railroads in the U.S.

== Livery ==
COP Locomotives have historically used a black and orange color scheme. The ALCO S-1 (#101 & 102) and ALCO S-3 (#103) units used by the railroad were primarily orange with two black horizontal stripes including white edging that tapered downward on the front and rear. The lower of the two stripes continued around the locomotive with the road-name "City of Prineville" in white text along the sides of the carbody.

As of 2014, the railroad owns two EMD GP20 and one EMD GP9. The GP20s retain the paint scheme of their previous owner, the Milwaukee Road.

In 2014, the COP purchased an EMD SW1500 of Southern Pacific heritage that carries a paint scheme resembling the older ALCO locos the ran in the 1950s, 1960s, and 1970s.

== Freight livery ==
The railroad also purchased several boxcars during the IPD Boxcar craze of the late 1970s, these cars were painted orange with a white outline of Oregon and a star where Prineville is located.

== Active locomotive roster ==
Number	Builder/model	Heritage
989	EMD GP20	MILW
1551	EMD SW1500	SP
1859	EMD MP15DC	MP
1873	EMD GP9	GN
