= Incentive per diem =

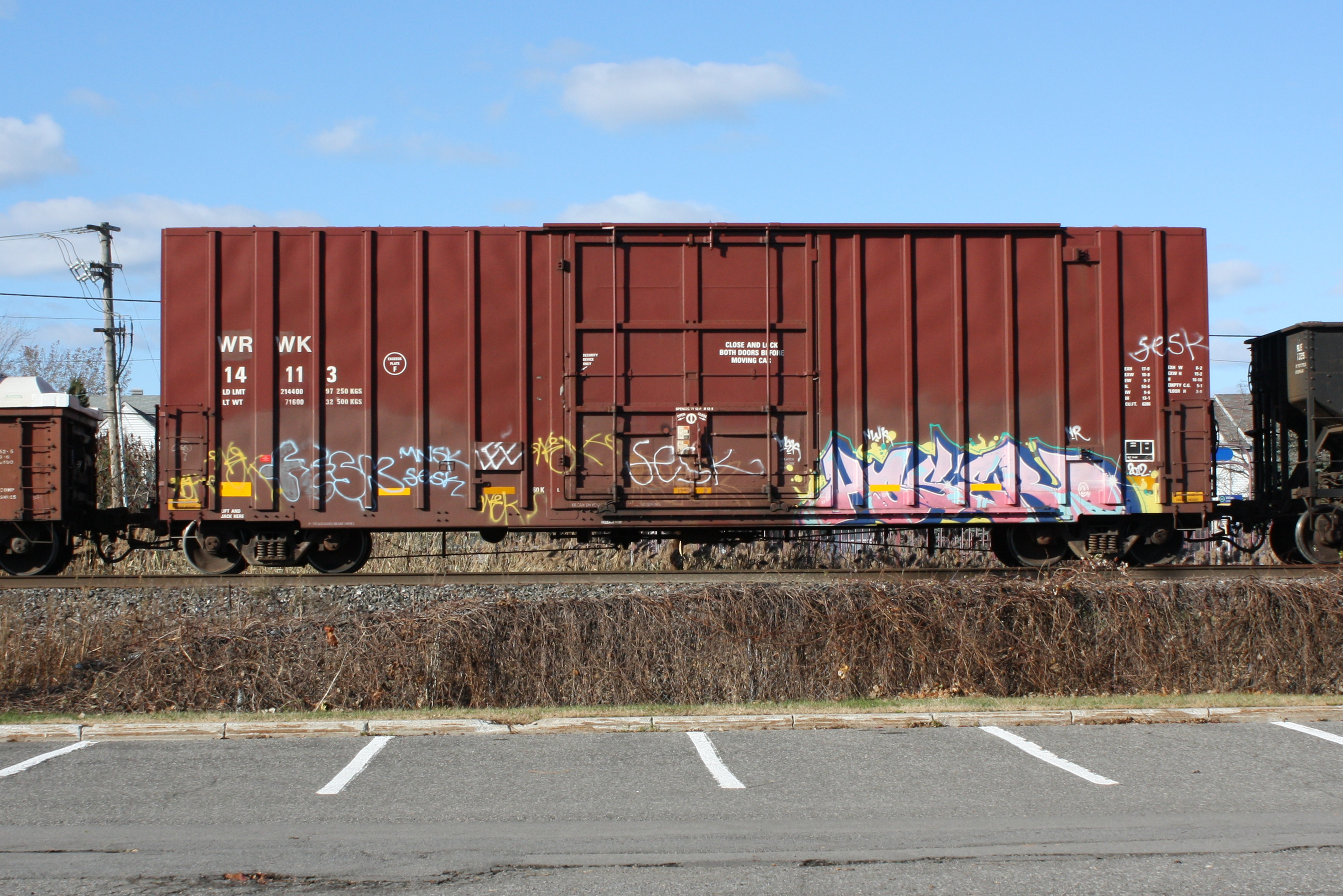
An incentive per diem boxcar, bearing the reporting marks of the 1-mile-long Warwick Railway

Incentive per diem (IPD) was a program created in the United States in 1970 to encourage railroads to purchase new boxcars. Established by the Interstate Commerce Commission (ICC), a regulatory agency overseeing railroads, the program offered significant payments to railroads that purchased new boxcars. Intended to relieve a perceived shortage of boxcars, the program was instead exploited by small railroads who worked with financial firms to exploit a loophole in the program and purchase large numbers of boxcars that generated extra revenue and were exempt from normal shipping rules. As many as 40,000 boxcars were built as a result of the program.

The railroads and financers that were exploiting IPD made profits until the early 1980s recession in the United States caused the scheme to collapse. Lowered demand for boxcars caused many of the IPD boxcars to sit idle, in many cases sent back to owners that didn't have space to store them. The ICC ended the program in 1980, and several of the firms invested in IPD boxcars ended up bankrupt.

== Background ==
From the 1950s onward, the general service (meaning used for a wide variety of shipments) boxcar fleet owned by American railroads significantly shrank. From a starting point of approximately 780,000 boxcars in the middle of the 1950s, boxcar inventory shrank to 637,000 by 1960 and 329,000 in 1973, a more than 50 percent decrease. Most production of new boxcars was oriented towards specialty uses, such as the shipment of automobile parts, leaving shippers who relied on general service boxcars facing a shortage and delays in the arrival of needed train cars. This took place amidst a general downturn in the railroad industry, and many railroads were in poor financial condition if not bankrupt. Cash-strapped railroads were unwilling to invest significant funds in new purchases of freight cars as a result. Shippers therefore began to complain to regulators that they were unable to get their goods shipped in a timely manner.

In reality, sufficient numbers of boxcars likely existed to meet demand, with the perceived shortage caused by poor utilization that saw boxcars spending as little as ten percent of their time carrying paying cargo. This was in part attributable to the Association of American Railroads (AAR) regulations followed by railroad companies which restricted the movement of boxcars. Under the AAR's car-service rules, when a boxcar owned by a railroad reached its destination, it had to then be returned to its owner regardless of whether there was any demand for transportation in that direction. If no loads could be found, the boxcar would return empty, and therefore not generating revenue. Additionally, any time a boxcar was on a railroad other than its owner, that railroad was required to pay the boxcar's owner a fee (known as a per diem) for every day it remained with that railroad. This fee was intended to support maintenance costs of the boxcars, as the more traffic a railroad handled, the more boxcars it was expected to own. The per diem was also intended to discourage railroads from delaying boxcars of other railroads. A typical per diem fee in the 1970s was around $12 per day.

== The incentive per diem program ==
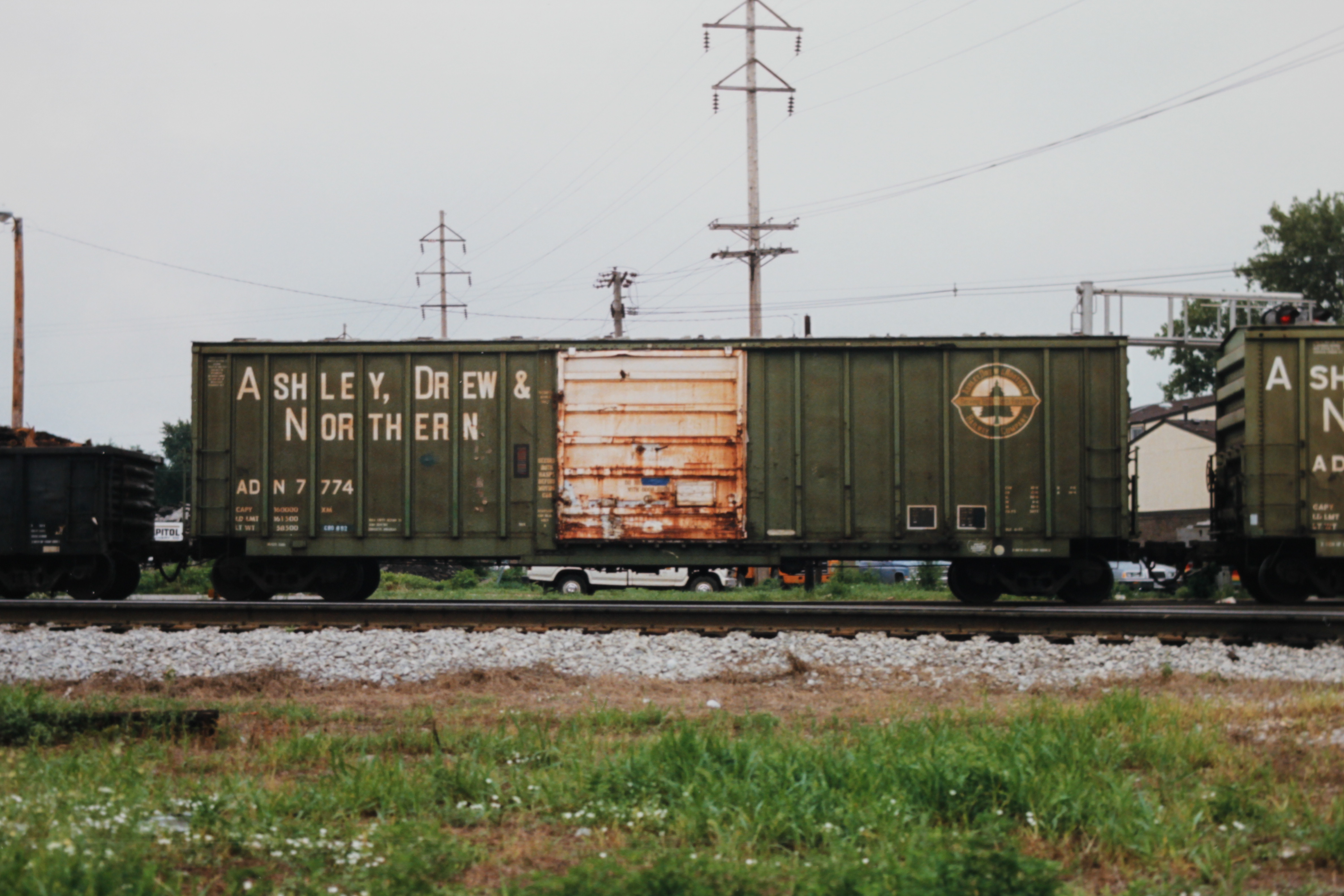
An Ashley, Drew and Northern Railway IPD boxcar

The Interstate Commerce Commission (ICC), which regulated railroads in the United States, announced it was considering a remedy to the perceived shortage in 1967. Responding to complaints by railroad shippers, the United States Congress passed legislation authorizing the ICC to modify per diem rates to incentivize more rapid movement of railcars in 1968. The ICC established an "incentive per diem" program in 1970. This added two new payments to qualifying boxcars (those less than five years old): a flat addition of around $10 to the normal per diem, and a new 4.7 cents per mile payment based on mileage traveled. These payments took effect between September and February, the busiest months for shipping. On top of these payments, the boxcars covered by the incentive per diem program were not subject to the normal AAR car-service rules, meaning that after a load was delivered, it could then be sent anywhere it was needed rather than only back to its owner.

To prevent abuse of the system, railroads with existing boxcar fleets were limited in how many new boxcars could be used in the program based on their existing fleet size. However, a loophole existed in the program: railroads that had owned no boxcars at all could introduce as many new incentive per diem boxcars as they wanted. A number of shortline railroads that had no boxcars of their own saw a business opportunity through the program. The only challenge was getting the funds to buy new boxcars, as most shortlines did not have the funds of larger railroads. This was solved by using financing, with lenders funding the purchase of new boxcars and then leasing them to shortline railroads for operations. Both the shortline railroads and the financers stood to make a profit from this system, while the boxcar fleet rapidly grew with newly built cars.

Financial firms rapidly began exploit the incentive per diem program for profit, some even buying entire shortline railroads and establishing boxcar repair facilities that could also assemble new boxcars from kits shipped by manufacturers. 11 years after the program's formation, approximately 40,000 boxcars had been built under incentive per diem.

== Collapse and aftermath ==
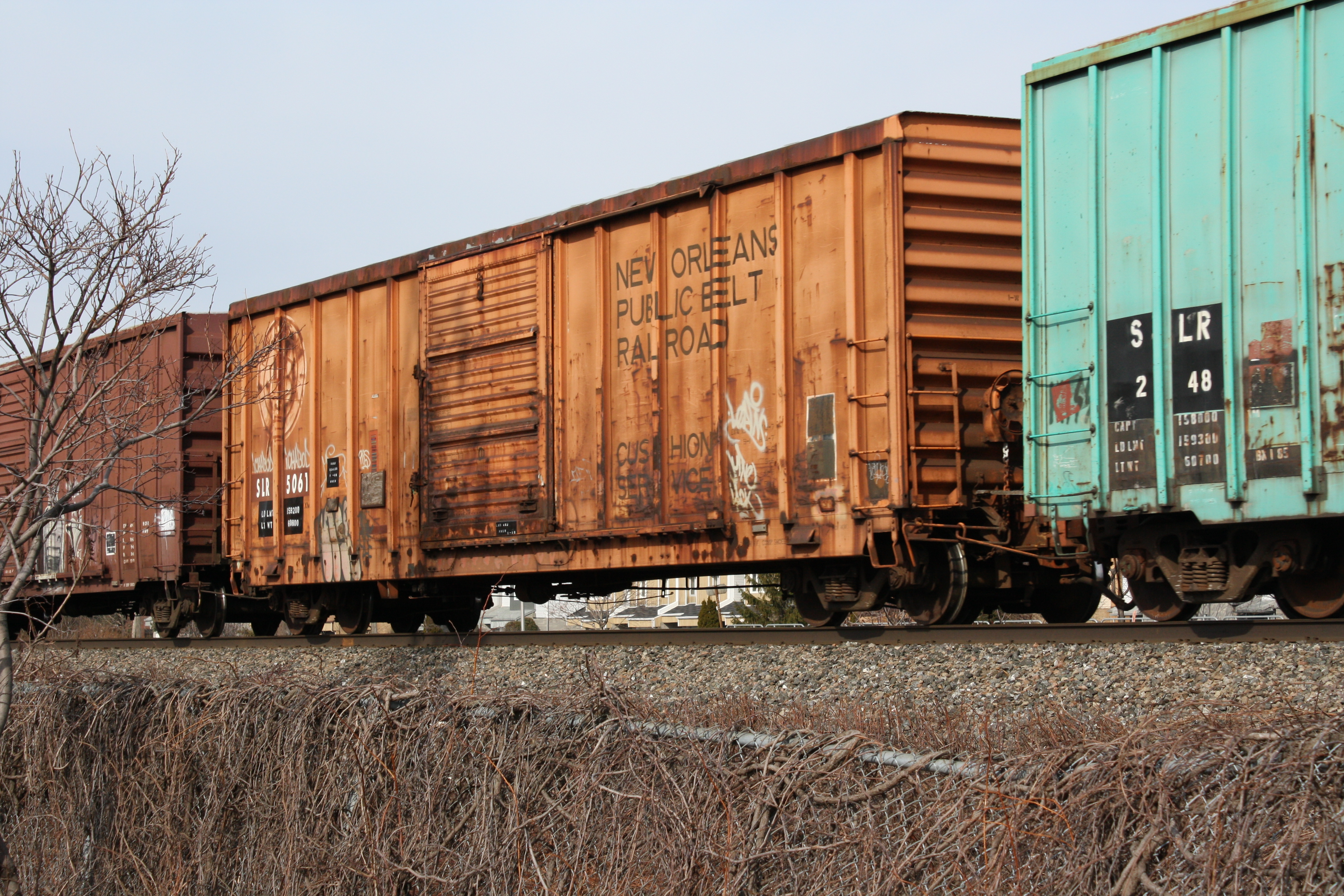
A New Orleans Public Belt Railroad IPD boxcar in 2009

While the incentive per diem program produced large profits for all involved, those exploiting the program were hit with a major reversal of fortunes during the recession that hit the United States in the early 1980s. Demand for boxcars dropped off significantly, and much of the remaining shipments now traveled in boxcars owned by the major railroads. Most of the incentive per diem boxcars now returned to their shortline railroad owners. Some of these shortlines directed portions of their boxcar fleets to serve shippers on their lines, but many of the railroads in question had few or no such shippers. Some had bought so many boxcars that, if they were all lined up, they would take up more space than their owners' entire railroad systems. More than 10,000 IPD boxcars sat idle.

Finally heeding the demands of aggrieved larger railroads who had watched shortlines exploit the incentive per diem system, the ICC discontinued the program in 1980. A number of financial firms that had invested heavily in IPD either divested from boxcars or went bankrupt, with firms including Railvest and Itel collapsing entirely. The IPD boxcars largely found new owners, including larger railroads and private owners that shipped by rail. IPD boxcars still owned by shortlines on December 31, 1981, were allowed to keep their increased per diem rate until their retirement. As boxcars can serve for a maximum of 50 years if rebuilt during their service lives, some IPD boxcars have survived into the early 2020s.
