= William G. LeDuc House =

Historic house in Minnesota, United States

- U.S. National Register of Historic Places
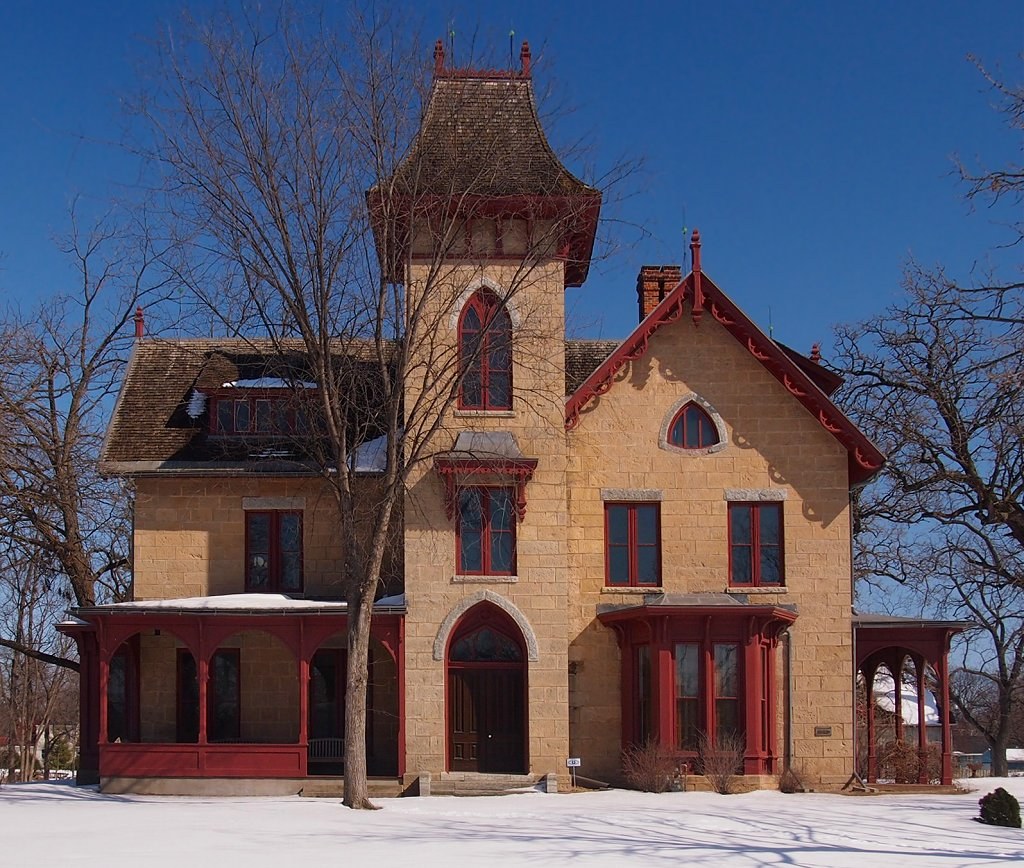
- The William G. LeDuc House from the west

- Location within Minnesota Location within the United States
- Location: Hastings, Minnesota
- Coordinates: 44°43′44.67″N 92°51′6.9″W
- Built: 1865
- Architect: based on plans by Andrew Jackson Downing
- Architectural style: Gothic Revival
- NRHP reference No.: 70000292
- Added to NRHP: June 22, 1970

The William G. LeDuc House, also known as the LeDuc Historic Estate, located at 1629 Vermillion Street in Hastings, Minnesota, United States, is listed on the National Register of Historic Places. It was built over several years, and completed in 1865, by William Gates LeDuc who came to Minnesota in 1850 from Ohio. He was an attorney who represented a party to a suit involving Vermillion Falls, 1,500 feet (457 m) southeast of the homesite. As payment for his services, Le Duc received the land where he built his house. LeDuc was a Civil War veteran and U.S. Commissioner of Agriculture under President Hayes (1877–1881).

The estate is an unusually complete example of the Carpenter Gothic style of Andrew Jackson Downing, a pioneer in American landscape architecture. William, and his wife Mary, used Downing's book, Cottage Residences, as inspiration for their home (Downing himself had died in 1852). The home was the first property to be acquired by the Minnesota Historical Society in the late 1950s but sat empty until 2005, when it was acquired by the City of Hastings. The Dakota County Historical Society partnered with the city to provide programing and interpretative services. $1.2 million was raised to restore the home and grounds to their former glory.

Construction on the LeDuc house began in 1862 and was completed in 1866. Following LeDuc's service as Quartermaster in the Civil War, the family moved into the unfinished home in August 1865. In March 1865 he had been brevetted a brigadier general for "efficiency, intelligence and zeal in the discharge of his duties".

William G. LeDuc came to St. Paul, Minnesota Territory in 1850 from Ohio to open a book store and law office. In 1854 he purchased a quarter share in the town of Hastings from Alexander Faribault. In 1856, he and his wife Mary Bronson LeDuc, with their two daughters moved downriver to Hastings, where they had also acquired two wheat farms and 160 acres with a small grist mill on the falls of the Vermillion River. It was on this property that William and Mary decided to build their dream home.

They chose a Gothic Revival home featured in a later edition of Andrew Jackson Downing's Cottage Residences. Downing was a landscape architect and author, whose reputation as a horticulturist was widespread. He inspired Americans to surround their homes with the beauty of nature and encouraged the use of good design even in planning farmsteads. William and Mary chose three Downing designs for their rural home site; their residence, Carriage Barn and Ice House. The estate is an unusually complete example of the Gothic Revival style of Andrew Jackson Downing.

Carroll Simmons, a friend of the LeDuc grandchildren, purchased the home in 1940 for his antique business. In 1958 he donated the home and outbuildings with 4 acres of land to the Minnesota Historical Society, with the agreement that he would continue using it for his antique business until he retired, which wasn't until 1986. Between 1986 and 2003 the future of the property was uncertain. Although it was the first property acquired by MHS, they had opened other house museums by the time they took possession. Needed repairs were done on the house and carriage barn, but the property stood empty.

Citizen groups actively sought out ways to fulfill Carroll Simmons' vision of having the LeDuc house open to the public. In 2002 the Minnesota Legislature apportioned 1.2 million dollars in bonding funds for MHS to preserve the house and bring it up to current building codes. Agreements were executed between the Minnesota Historical Society, the City of Hastings and the Dakota Country Historical Society, which resulted in city ownership and DCHS management of the site.

The site opened for tours on May 22, 2005. June 24, 2005, the Society deaccessioned the LeDuc House to the City of Hastings. As part of the agreement, the Society transferred $604,000 of net assets provided by Carroll Simmons for endowment, repairs and maintenance of the LeDuc House.
