= Joel T. Headley House =

Historic mansion in New York

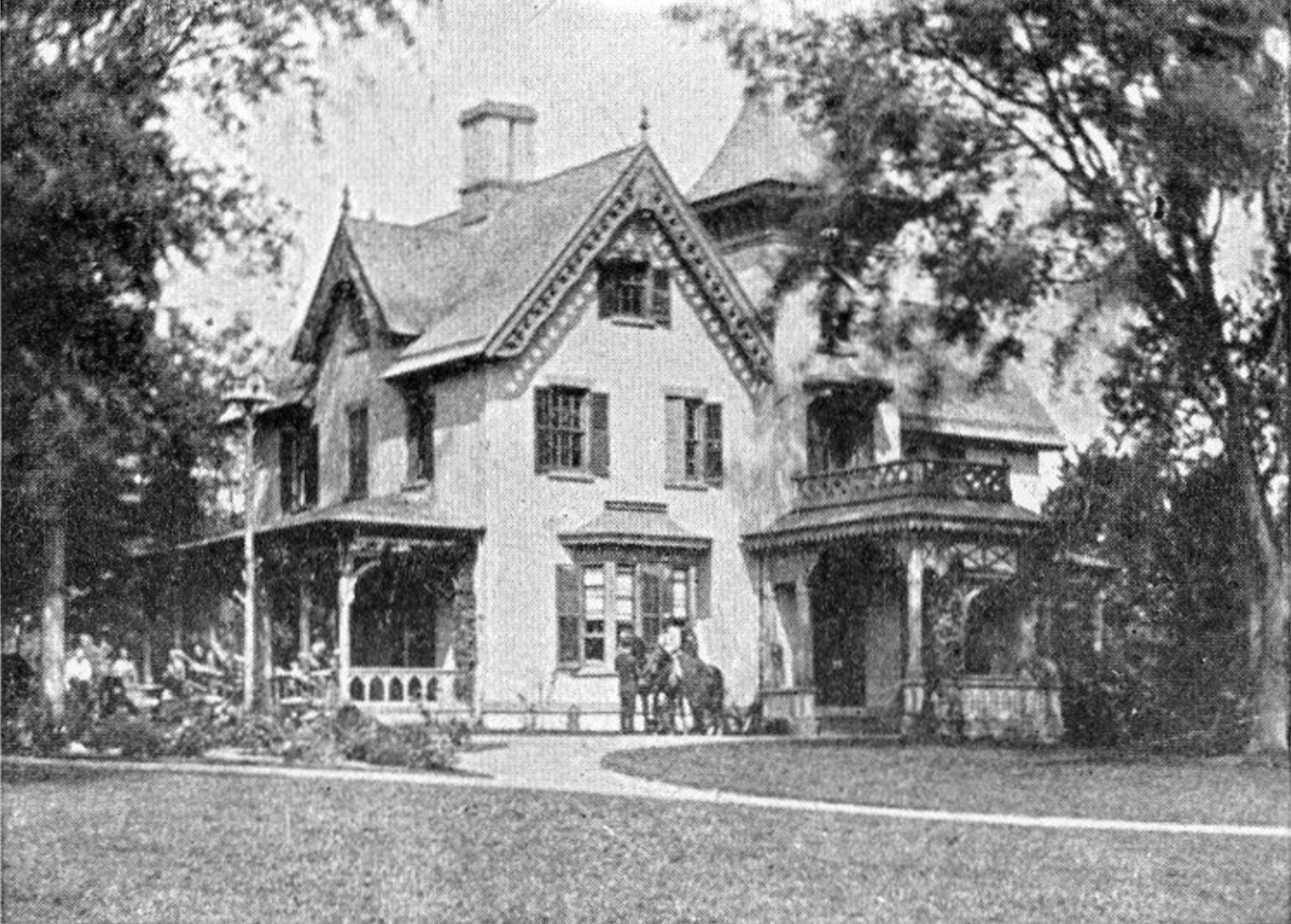
- Main entrance in 1904
- Former names: Glenhurst, Lucas Estate
- Alternative names: Cedar Lawn, Headley House

General information
- Type: Private residence
- Architectural style: Gothic Revival
- Location: New Windsor, New York, United States
- Completed: 1851
- Cost: $4,800

Technical details
- Material: Brick
- Floor count: 3
- Floor area: 6,300 sq ft
- Grounds: 4.9 acres

Design and construction
- Architects: Andrew Jackson Downing and Calvert Vaux (house); George E. Harney (addition and outbuildings)

The Joel T. Headley House is a historic mansion in New Windsor, New York, built for historian and writer Joel T. Headley (1813–1897), who later served as a New York State Assemblyman for Orange County and the New York Secretary of State (1856–1857). Headley commissioned the house and grounds from local architectural theorist and landscape designer Andrew Jackson Downing with assistance from his partner, English architect Calvert Vaux. Subsequent owners were unaware of the house's significance until the 1990s. The design, No. 14 "A Cottage in the Rhine style" featured in a later edition of his book Cottage Residences, also inspired the William G. DeLuc House in Minnesota, considered a rare example of Gothic-inspired architecture there.

== History ==
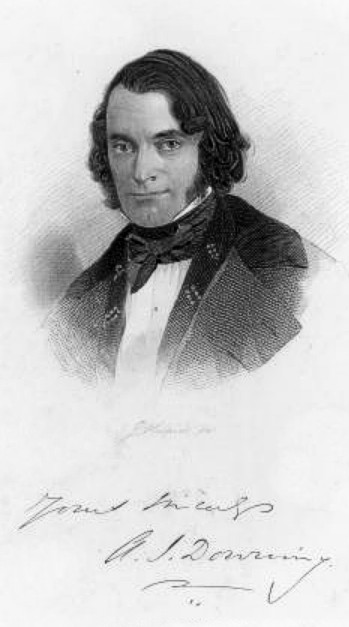
A. J. Downing

In 1709, William Chambers and William Sutherland received part of land patent by Colonel Peter Matthews, overlooking the Hudson River and adjoining Palatine farmland across Quassaick Creek. Their families attempted to cultivate the land's rocky soil, remaining there until the Revolutionary War. In the early part of the 19th century, Thomas W. Chrystie came to own the tract, part of which Robert Boyd, a blacksmith, used to farm. On the Boyd farm above the creek, a later occupant, the Walsh family, erected a Greek Revival house.

Due to its privacy and proximity to Newburgh, the area aroused great interest. Chrystie began to parcel off lots, two of which Joel T. Headley purchased for approximately $2,600 in 1850. The picturesque setting, which included the river and Highlands, thoroughly matched his expectations. This concluded his property search between New York City and upstate, which he admired for its natural beauty, himself a native of Delaware County.

=== Construction ===
A probable reader of Downing's work, Headley decided to approach the newly organized architectural firm Downing & Vaux with designs in mind. He wished to preserve the semi-rural atmosphere and heritage of the land while still being able to boast an impressive residence. Aside from accommodations to host guests, the Headleys also intended to raise a family in the house. With additional costs for construction, the house and property totaled to about $8,000, though Headley could have afforded more with his book royalties.

The Headleys decided to sell the house in 1870, possibly because maintaining the entire property proved toilsome. They shortly after moved into a row house, 172 South Street in Newburgh, with more accessible conveniences. In 1877, the family moved to 277 Grand Street, where Headley died of paralysis at age 84 in 1897.

==== Musgrave Country Seat ====
Harriet Pardee Musgrave took ownership of the house in 1871, purchased by her father, R. Harris Pardee, a merchant. Harriet and her husband, Stephen B. Musgrave, supervised subsequent renovations paid for by Pardee and had a child that same year. George E. Harney, architect of the renovations, did business in Newburgh. In 1873, he contributed revisions to the new edition of Downing's Cottage Residences.

He made many interior changes on the upper floor, removing a dressing room and attic stairs to extend the central hallway. It joined the main house with the principal kitchen wing, allowing for more servant bed chambers and general space on the second floor. Harney's most dramatic change to the main house was a Stick Style porte cochere, since replaced and demolished.

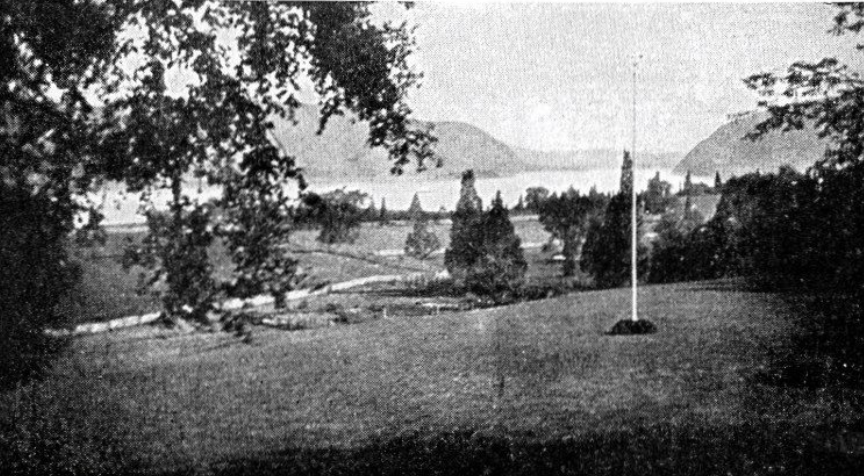
View of the Hudson, now obstructed by overgrowth and development along Route 9W

=== 20th century and rediscovery ===
Ownership shifted to John A. Corcoran in the early 20th century, who commissioned New York architecture firm Rogers & Haneman to construct the current back wing. The firm's work included demolishing the wall between the original dining room and library to create a larger space. Following the Corcorans, a carpet distributor named O'Connor came to own the house, furnishing it according to Newport tastes.

For an unknown period, the house sat semi-abandoned, similar to the condition of other nearby mansions during this time. In the 1940s, Andrew E. Lucas purchased the house for his family, priced inexpensively. They remained there until the 1980s, but initially found living conditions difficult due to its small number of bedrooms and bathrooms. Artist Kenny Scharf owned the house during the late 1980s and early 1990s, using it as a studio and weekend residence. It was not until the late 1990s that Scott Henry, a subsequent owner, discovered the house had been a Downing & Vaux design. The latter 20th century brought a period of historic home renovations to Newburgh, sparking a renewed interest in the abundance of local work by the partners.

== Design and description ==
When first tasked with designing the house, Downing and Vaux used a similar approach echoed by their partner Frederick Clarke Withers in his 1858 design for the Calvary Presbyterian Church in Newburgh. The building would harmonize with its natural landscape, incorporating steep roof-lines and colors akin to the mountain scenery. Such a decision proved convenient, as Downing favored Rhenish-style architecture; the Hudson would supplement the Rhine.

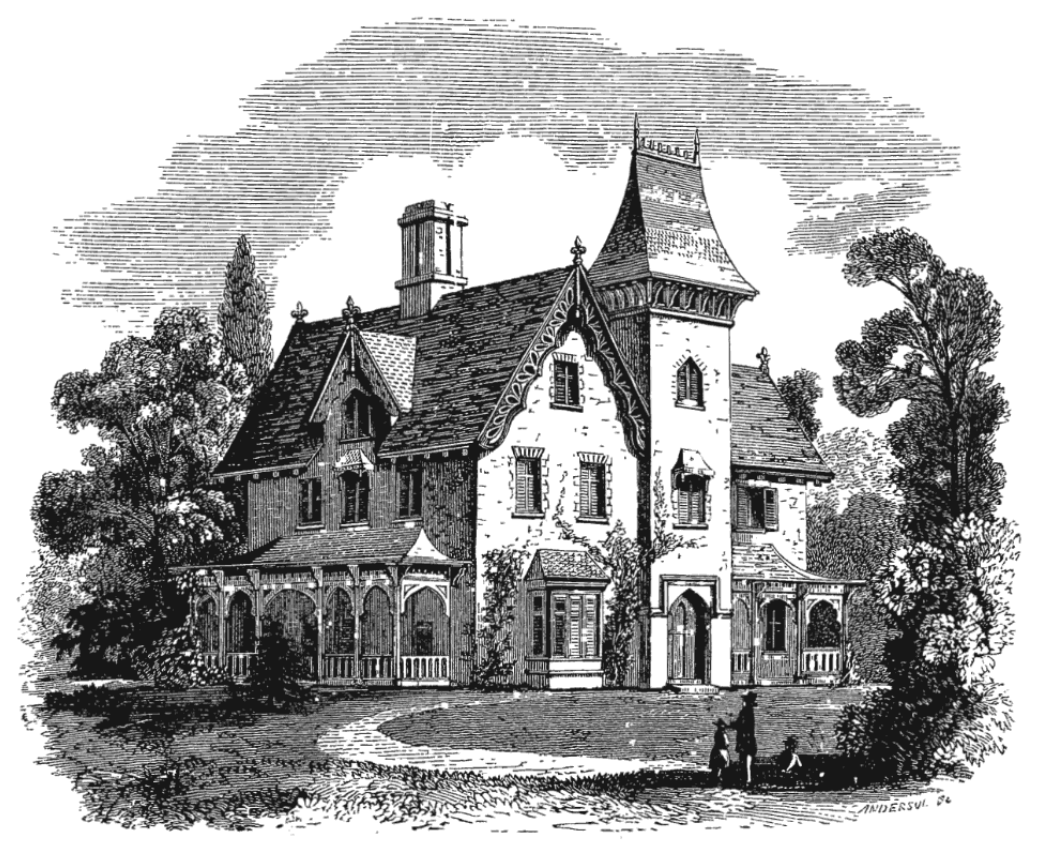
Frontispiece for a later edition of Cottage Residences, Downing's approved engraving of the house

=== Exterior ===
The house is placed at an angle, facing the eastern sunrise, with its front entrance hidden from Quassaick Avenue. Visitors would be taken down the driveway through a technique known as "the approach," conveying the impression that the house was turning towards them. In this style of laying pathways, the house also appears to grow in magnitude and grandeur.

Of the house's initial appearance, Downing and Vaux wanted a spirited and irregular composition with simple details to appease Headley. The heavily pierced bargeboard and tower cresting (now removed) are indicative of the architect's delicacy, as the rest of the exterior initially appeared rather plain. Other ornamental features included finial-capped bargeboards on the dormer windows and edges of rooflines. Decorative brick once lined the edges of front windows, visible in the frontispiece sketch for the house.

The foundation consists of Hudson bluestone, traditionally quarried in Kingston, but the remainder of the house is done in brick, over time, painted with several schemes. The architects despised plain white, and opted for a fawn color appropriate for the rural setting, translated by mixing ochre and sand shades, which mistakenly gave the impression of stucco.

A chief Rhenish feature, the house's four-story curved tower, contains the slightly recessed front entrance. Downing included an explanation for the tower's relevance to the design in Cottage Residences.

"It is in this mental delight awakened by the contrast of symbols of repose and action, of beauty and power, in the lake that slumbers peacefully, and the hills that lift themselves boldly or grandly above it, that we find the explanation of part of the peculiar charm which belongs to those picturesque towers and 45 campaniles of the edifices and villas of the Rhine and Italian lakes. The same good effect will follow from the introduction of buildings composed upon similar principles, and placed on our picturesque river banks."

Headley recollected a particular fondness for the Rhine, as he recalled his travels there, but remarked that the setting was "inferior to the Hudson." During the writing of 1847's The Alps and the Rhine, Headley makes note of the Rhine Gorge and its "ruined castles—gaping towers—dilapidated fortresses."

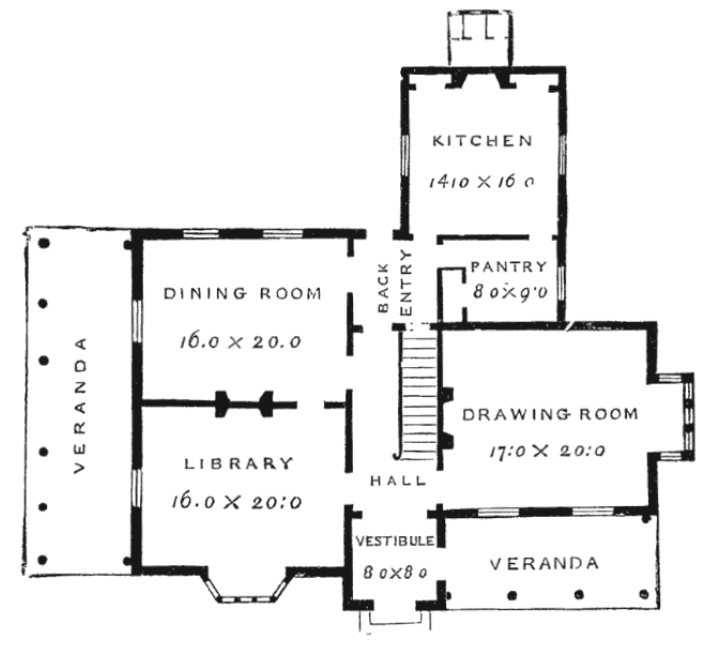
Principal floor plan

=== Interior ===
It is through the tower's Moorish-style entranceway that one enters the house, with a repeated larger one into the main hallway, suggesting a Vaux implementation as seen at Olana.

The first floor, larger than the others, stands at 12' with walls 1' thick. The second, or chamber floor, is 9 1/2' with an 8" thickness.

==== Drawing Room ====
The original drawing room, located to the visitor's direct right, now serves as the house's dining room due to its proximity to the current kitchen. It is characterized by tall recessed panel wainscoting of three rows, each of a different height, nearly reaching the top of the three windows. The deep bay window at the furthest end also carries some paneling near the baseboard, and aligns with the marble fireplace across the room. Above, the crown molding is emphasized through painted ceiling ornamentation, which includes the likeness of a scallop shell.

==== Library and Dining Room ====
As the dividing wall of recessed bookcases between the library and dining room has been demolished, one large, substantial room serves as the house's current living room. Tiger oak or black walnut paneling dominates the space, as does the pressed plaster ceiling. The Art Nouveau fireplace, added later, also adopts the Moorish figure, with a mantle of four pilasters.

=== Grounds ===
Harney erected brick stables south of the house and a cottage to the north end of the property.

Downing and Vaux do not explicitly mention a landscape design, and the property occupied a much smaller ground than Downing's own estate or his plans for Matthew Vassar's Springside. An estimation of the landscape design's scale and beauty comes from the Headley's sale of the house, priced unusually high, indicating the grounds played a part in the value. The deed of sale indicates multiples species of trees on the property, including chestnut, oak, cedar and cherry. Today, the property hosts many more varieties of trees and plants, with some thought to date to the 19th century. Although the majority of New Windsor during this period was farmland, including the area above Headley House, the family did not maintain a barn. The fruit trees comprised a kitchen garden, only to be used for their benefit. Acreage decreased from almost 14 acres to below 5 acres over time, as Route 9W developed in the 20th century and the neighboring property became a private airfield.

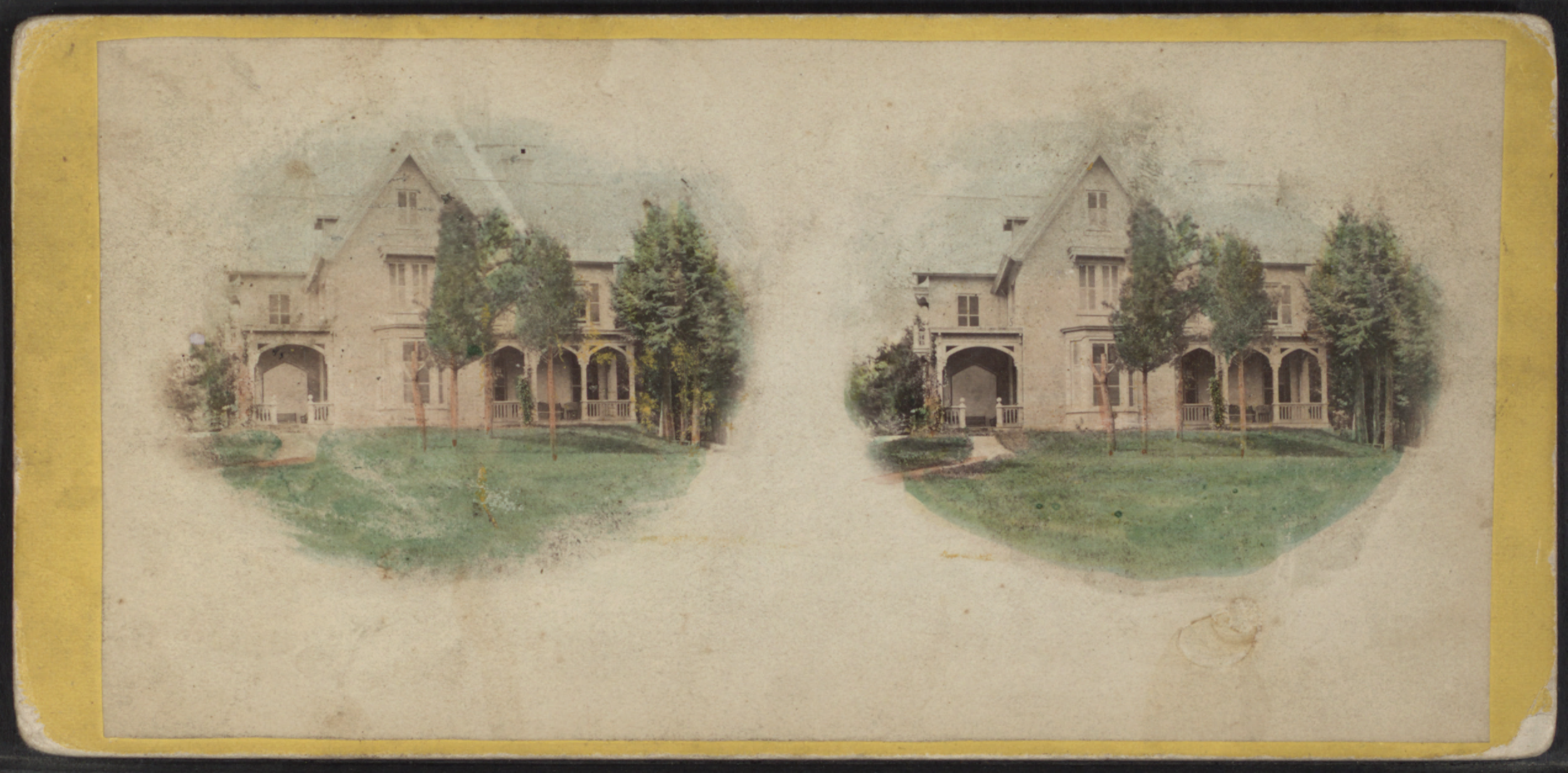
Idlewild, the Vaux-designed estate of Willis

Scott Henry uncovered a forgotten 300-foot grape arbor and the remains of a 40' x 60' porcelain swimming pool dated to 1903–1911.

An artificial pond of Downing's creation has since vanished, linking it with a still existing, albeit dry stream that forms the north boundary. The stream originally fed a little waterfall, with the runoff descending into the Hudson. This sunken boundary eliminated the need for a wall or fence, thereby keeping the property's sloping lawns undisturbed. Today, this stream is visible from Holly Drive in the Lacey Field neighborhood bordering the estate.

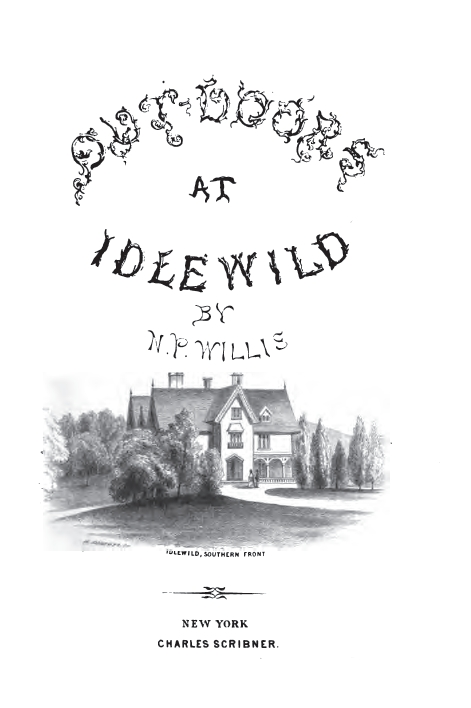
Outdoors at Idlewild (1855) describes Headley House

Nathaniel Parker Willis, the renowned magazine writer and poet, often visited his contemporary Headley. Willis's estate, the Vaux-designed Idlewild in nearby Cornwall-on-Hudson, stood approximately 4 miles from Headley's Cedar Lawn. The estate's name, fallen into obscurity, is less remembered than simply, "Headley House." Willis describes the road connecting Newburgh and Cornwall, which encapsulates parts of the present-day Route 94. Its New Windsor stretch, Quassaick Avenue, has existed for centuries.

"‘Round by Headley's’" we commonly call it – an upper road, along the bank of the Hudson, on which our friend the hero-grapher built his beautiful house, and 64 of the most charming of carriage-drives, avenued with cedars and country seats for miles. As the finest rural outlet from the handsomest streets of Newburgh, we drove over it often, particularly with friends and strangers, whom we wished to impress agreeably with the scenery between Idlewild and there."
