= Senator St. John =

Senator St. John may refer to:

- Daniel B. St. John (1808–1890), New York State Senate
- John St. John (American politician) (1833–1916), Kansas State Senate
