= Ambrose S. Murray =

American politician

Ambrose Spencer Murray
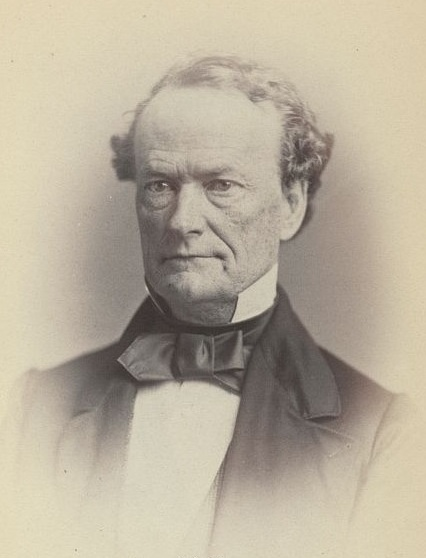
- From 1859's McClees' Gallery of Photographic Portraits of the Senators, Representatives & Delegates of the Thirty-Fifth Congress

Member of the U.S. House of Representatives from New York's 10th district
- In office March 4, 1855 – March 3, 1859
- Preceded by: William Murray
- Succeeded by: Charles Henry Van Wyck

Treasurer of Orange County, New York
- In office 1848–1851
- Preceded by: None (position created)
- Succeeded by: Benjamin F. Edsall

Personal details
- Born: November 27, 1807 Wallkill, New York
- Died: November 9, 1885 (aged 77) Goshen, New York
- Resting place: Saint James' Cemetery, Goshen, New York
- Party: Whig (before 1855); Republican (from 1855)
- Spouse: Frances Wisner (m. 1836-1885, his death)
- Relations: William Murray (brother)
- Children: 6
- Occupation: Bank president Businessman

Ambrose Spencer Murray (November 27, 1807 – November 9, 1885) was an American businessman and politician from New York. He is best known for his service as a U.S. Representative from New York.

Murray was a native of Wallkill, New York, and attended the local schools. He worked for several years as a clerk in his uncle's Middletown, New York, store, then moved to Goshen, New York, to begin a career in banking and business. He became the president of the Orange County Bank in 1845, and served until his death. Murray was also active in other businesses, including serving on the board of directors for several railroads and financial institutions.

As an opponent of slavery, Murray became active in politics as a Whig, and migrated to the Republican Party as the abolition movement coalesced. He served as Orange County Treasurer from 1848 to 1851.

In 1854, Murray ran successfully for a seat in the U.S. House of Representatives as a Whig. He was reelected in 1856, and served from 1855 to 1859. His tenure was noted for his continued opposition to slavery. In 1856, he was one of the two Congressmen who came to the aid of Senator Charles Sumner when Representative Preston Brooks committed his attack on Sumner on the floor of the U.S. Senate.

After leaving Congress, Murray resumed his banking and business activities. As a director of the Erie Railroad, he used his connections to obtain free tickets and passes for runaway slaves, facilitating their escape to Canada. During the American Civil War, Murray was a member of the committee that raised and equipped the 124th New York Volunteer Infantry Regiment. Murray died in Goshen on November 9, 1885, and was buried at Saint James' Cemetery in Goshen.

== Early life ==
Murray was born in Wallkill, New York, on November 27, 1807, the seventh of nine children born to William Murray and Mary Ann (Beakes) Murray. His siblings included William Murray, who also served as a member of Congress from New York.

== Start of career ==
Murray was raised on his family's farm and attended the local schools. At age seventeen he became a clerk in the Middletown, New York, store which was owned by his uncle. He remained at the store from 1824 to 1831, when he moved to Goshen, New York, to become a clerk at the Orange County Bank. In 1834, Murray was promoted to cashier. In 1845 he was chosen to serve as the bank's president, and he served in this position until his death. Murray was involved in several other businesses, including member of the board of directors for the Wallkill Valley Railroad, Erie Railroad, and Farmers' Loan and Trust Company (a predecessor firm of Citigroup).

Murray was a delegate to the 1848 Whig National Convention. He served as treasurer of Orange County from 1848 to 1851. (Note: Some sources indicate 1851 to 1854, but Ruttenber and Clark's History of Orange County makes clear that the dates were 1848 to 1851.)

== Congressman ==
Originally a Whig, after the party's collapse following the 1852 elections, in 1854 Murray was elected to the Thirty-fourth Congress as a member of the Whig Party. In 1856, he won reelection to the Thirty-fifth Congress as the nominee of the new Republican Party, which had become the main anti-slavery party. Murray served from March 4, 1855, to March 3, 1859, and his committee assignments included Revolutionary Claims (first term) and Mileage (second term).

In October 1855, Murray was a vice president of the final New York State Whig Convention, which took the initial steps to align the declining Whig Party with the recently formed Republican Party. His tenure was noted for his opposition to slavery; when Congress considered approval of the pro-slavery Lecompton Constitution for Kansas in 1858, Murray was in mourning for the death of one of his sons and attending to his ill wife, but left Goshen to return to Washington in time vote no. In 1856, Murray was one of two Representatives who interceded in the Caning of Charles Sumner, stopping Representative Preston Brooks' attack on Senator Charles Sumner and obtaining medical aid for Sumner.

=== Electoral history ===
New York's 10th congressional district election, 1854
Party	Candidate	Votes	%
Whig	Ambrose S. Murray	5,209	44.05
Hard Shell Democrat	Charles S. Woodworth	4,564	38.59
Soft Shell Democrat	Jonathan Stratton	462	17.36
Total votes		10,235	100.00
Whig gain from Democratic			

New York's 10th congressional district election, 1856
Party	Candidate	Votes	%
Republican	Ambrose S. Murray (incumbent)	6,156	39.28
Democratic	Samuel S. Fowler	5,581	35.61
Know Nothing	Charles W. Trotter	3,936	25.11
Total votes		15,673	100.00
Republican gain from Whig			

New York's 11th congressional district election, 1864
Party	Candidate	Votes	%
Democratic	Charles H. Winfield (incumbent)	9,976	50.61
National Union	Ambrose S. Murray	9,736	49.39
Total votes		19,712	100.00
Democratic hold			

== Later life ==
After leaving Congress, Murray resumed banking in Goshen, New York. He served as a delegate to the 1860 Republican National Convention. In the years before slavery was ended, Murray used his connection to the Erie Railroad to provide fugitive slaves free passes and tickets to aid them in escaping to Canada. During the American Civil War, Governor Edwin D. Morgan appointed committees of leading citizens in each of New York's counties to facilitate the recruiting and equipping of troops for the Union Army. Murray was Goshen's member of the Orange County Committee, and played a key role in raising the 124th New York Volunteer Infantry Regiment, which consisted primarily of soldiers from Orange County, and was nicknamed the Orange Blossoms. Two of Murray's sons, George and Wisner, served in the Union Army as members of the 7th New York Volunteer Infantry Regiment.

== Death and burial ==
Murray died in Goshen, New York, on November 9, 1885. (Note: Murray's Congressional biography indicates November 8, but contemporary newspaper articles including the obituary in the November 9 edition of his hometown newspaper, The Argus (Middletown, NY), and the New York State Death Index for 1885, indicate that he died at about 1:00 AM on November 9.) He was interred at Saint James' Cemetery in Goshen.

== Family ==
In 1836, Murray married Frances Wisner (1814-1906), a daughter of Henry G. Wisner and Sarah (Talman) Wisner. They were the parents of six children—Ellen, George W., Wisner, Ambrose S. Jr., Russell, and Francis W.

== Notes ==
U.S. House of Representatives
Preceded by William Murray	Member of the U.S. House of Representatives from New York's 10th congressional district March 4, 1855 – March 3, 1859	Succeeded by Charles Henry Van Wyck
