= City Club (Newburgh, New York) =

Historic ruin in New York, US

- U.S. Historic district – Contributing property
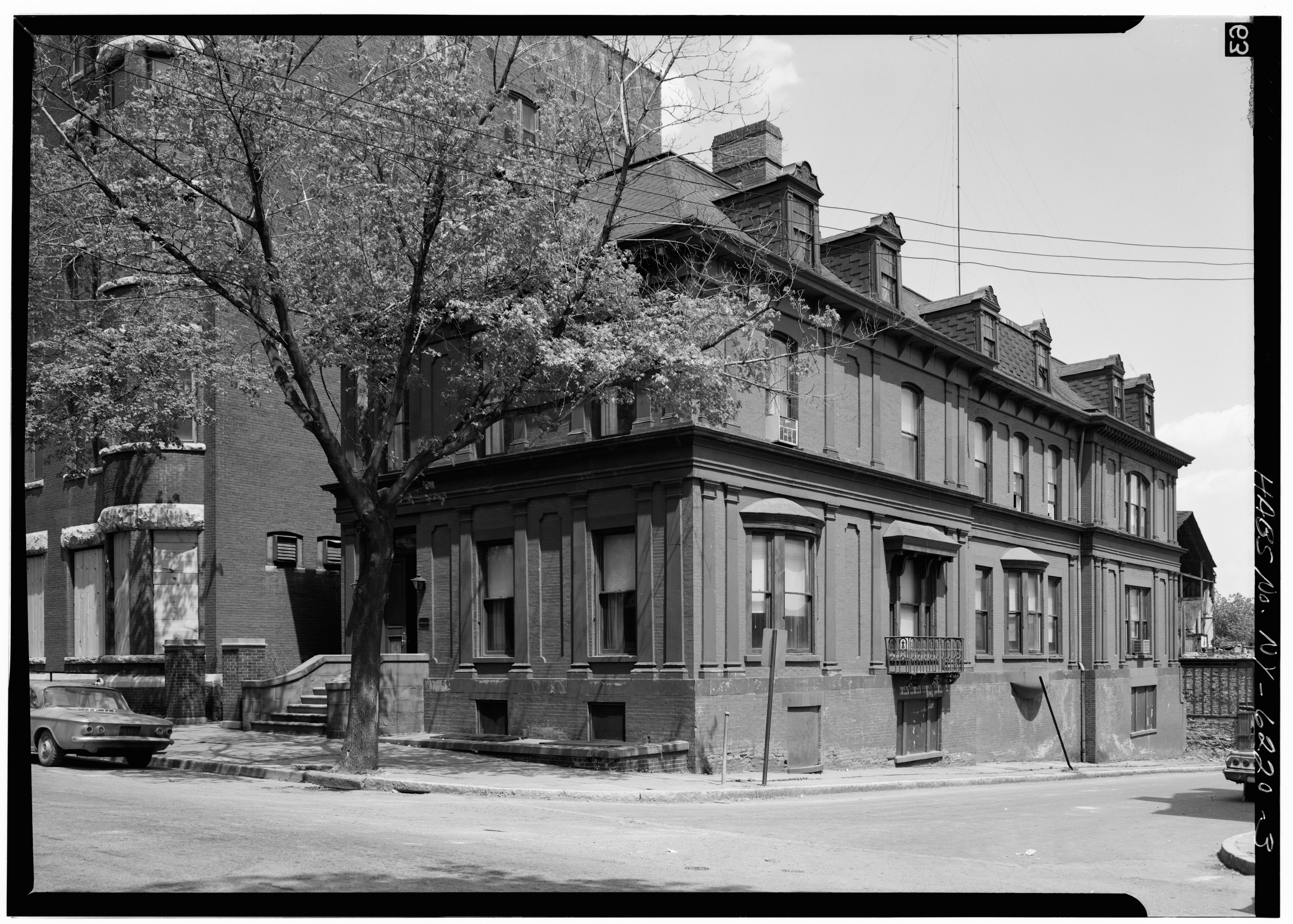
- The City Club in May 1970

- Location within New York
- Location: 120 Grand Street Newburgh, New York
- Coordinates: 41°30′13.29″N 74°0′33.23″W
- Built: c. 1851-1852
- Built by: Franklin Gerard
- Architect: Calvert Vaux, Andrew Jackson Downing; Frank E. Estabrook (rear expansion)
- Architectural style: Second Empire
- Part of: Montgomery–Grand–Liberty Streets Historic District (ID73001246)
- Designated CP: 1973

The City Club, known also as the William Culbert House, is a historic ruin at the corner of Grand and 2nd Streets in Newburgh, New York. Designed in the early 1850s by Calvert Vaux and Andrew Jackson Downing, the house survived Urban Renewal efforts but succumbed to fire in 1981. Plans have been made since its destruction to reconstruct the interior, a project often paired with restoration of the nearby Dutch Reformed Church, but none have ever been executed. The house appears in Vaux's most celebrated work, Villas and Cottages (1857) as Design No. 22. It is one of the earliest Second Empire houses in the United States, designed just after Detlef Lienau's now lost Hart M. Shiff House (1850) and the earlier Edward Deacon House in Boston's South End. For a brief time in the late 1970s, the former City Club housed the offices of restorer Brian Thompson. Due to its centralized location, it has become a symbol of the restoration movement in Newburgh, also representing the city's decay.

== History ==
=== Culbert ===
Dr. William A. M. Culbert (1822 — 1890) was born in New York City to a merchant family, newly arrived there following the Revolution. He attended the University of the City of New York, graduating from the Academic and Medical Departments with a BA, and pursuing homeopathy. Culbert studied under Professor of Surgery at the university, Dr. Valentine Mott, who at the time was deemed one of world's most esteemed surgeons. In the fall of 1847, Culbert arrived in Newburgh to begin his practice.

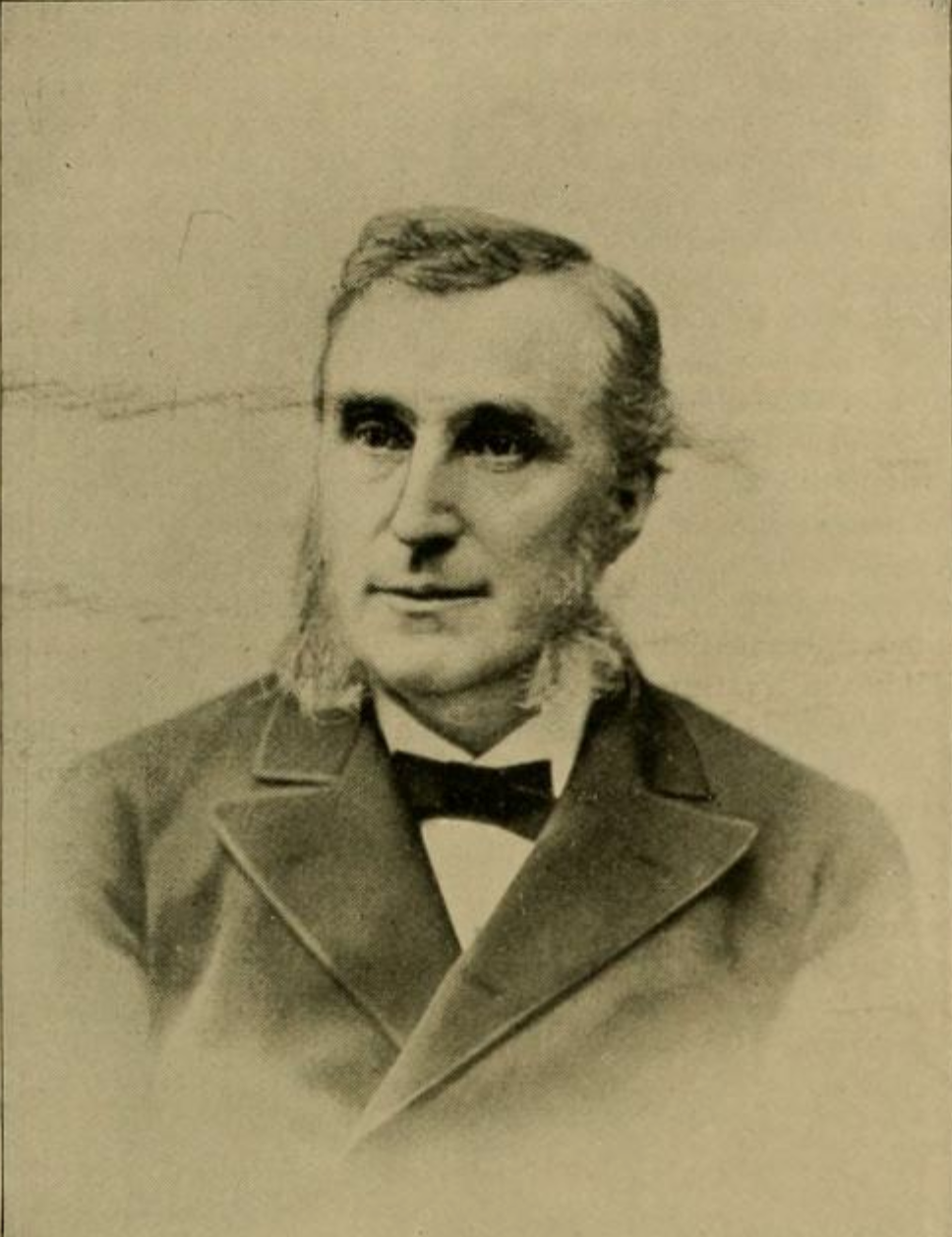
Dr. William A. M. Culbert

On October 12, 1852, he married Henrietta Powell (1832 — 1908), granddaughter of Thomas Powell (1769 —1856), an upstanding Newburgh citizen and merchant. Powell helped establish Newburgh as a shipping center, adding docks to village's bustling port for his freighting business. Originally from Hempstead, Powell came to the Hudson Valley with his mother and brother after the death of their father, Henry. Beginning in 1823, Thomas continued the mildly lucrative mercantile business he had begun with his brother, eventually amassing a fortune and ordering the construction of a steamboat fleet. One of the ships was named for his wife, affectionately known as the Mary Powell. Thomas and Mary had one son, Robert Ludlow Powell (1805 — 1833), who married Louisa A. Orso (1806 — 1896), the parents of Henrietta and several daughters. Due to Henrietta's status, it became necessary for Culbert to earn the village's respect.

Sometime before the wedding, Culbert commissioned Downing & Vaux to build him a house and office on Grand Street. The exact date of erection is unknown, but city historian Helen VerNooy Gearn first estimated 1852 or earlier in conjunction with the wedding. Gearn also recognized that this may have been one of the last collaborations between Downing & Vaux, as Downing perished in a steamboat accident on July 28, 1852. In Villas and Cottages, the mark "D&V" indicates Design No. 22 is the firm's work. The house's corner lot inherently made planning its street-facing side crucial, as it needed to be congruous with the slope and also keen to the eye. Due to the success of the architects at this task, the building is sometimes pictured from its 2nd Street side to capture its length. They anticipated Grand Street would become the main promenade of Newburgh; the house had to be impressive from every angle, suiting the occupiers.

Of Culbert's medical career, John J. Nutt remarked that he was:

"Carefully educated, possessed of an unusually clear and logical mind, fully alive to every advance in his profession and allowing no one dogma to fetter his judgment — he was a physician in the broadest sense of the term. Ever true to the interests of his patients, Dr. Culbert soon won and maintained to the time of his death the reputation of an accurate diagnostician, an independent thinker and an unusually practical and successful prescriber."

William A. M. Culbert died on November 10, 1890, leaving Henrietta and their son, Francis Ramsdell Culbert, named for the one of Newburgh's most notable families at the time, the Ramsdells. After the Culberts, one of the founders of Sweet, Orr & Co., Clayton E. Sweet, purchased the house. The Sweet Brothers, Clayton E. and Clinton W., entered business with their uncle, James A. Orr, in 1871, establishing an East Coast base for the overall business in Wappingers Falls. By 1880, expansion of the company's operations prompted a relocation to Newburgh. Clayton E. Sweet and his wife Charity sold the house on March 1, 1904 to be used as a headquarters for the City Club.

=== City Club Usage ===
The City Club, a gentleman's social organization, formed in 1891. As membership and status within the club began to decline in the 1960s, the house became shared by tenants. One upstairs office, serving as chambers for the justice of the State Supreme Court, Ninth Judicial District, underwent a remodeling to hold a law library. This library was originally to serve the purpose of the Newburgh Bar Association as a private, non-profit organization, but soon after came under state control, which assumed costs of operation.

With the surge of Urban Renewal demolition projects below Grand Street in 1970, the Newburgh URA finished the year by razing the Club's neighbor, the defunct Palatine Hotel. After the collapse of inner-city hotels during the 1940s, and failed attempts to revive the original splendor of the establishment, the hotel closed in 1957 following a bankruptcy filing. It sat abandoned for a decade. In the period between its shutdown and demolition, the hotel and club both suffered periodic vandalism and neglect.

=== Law Library ===
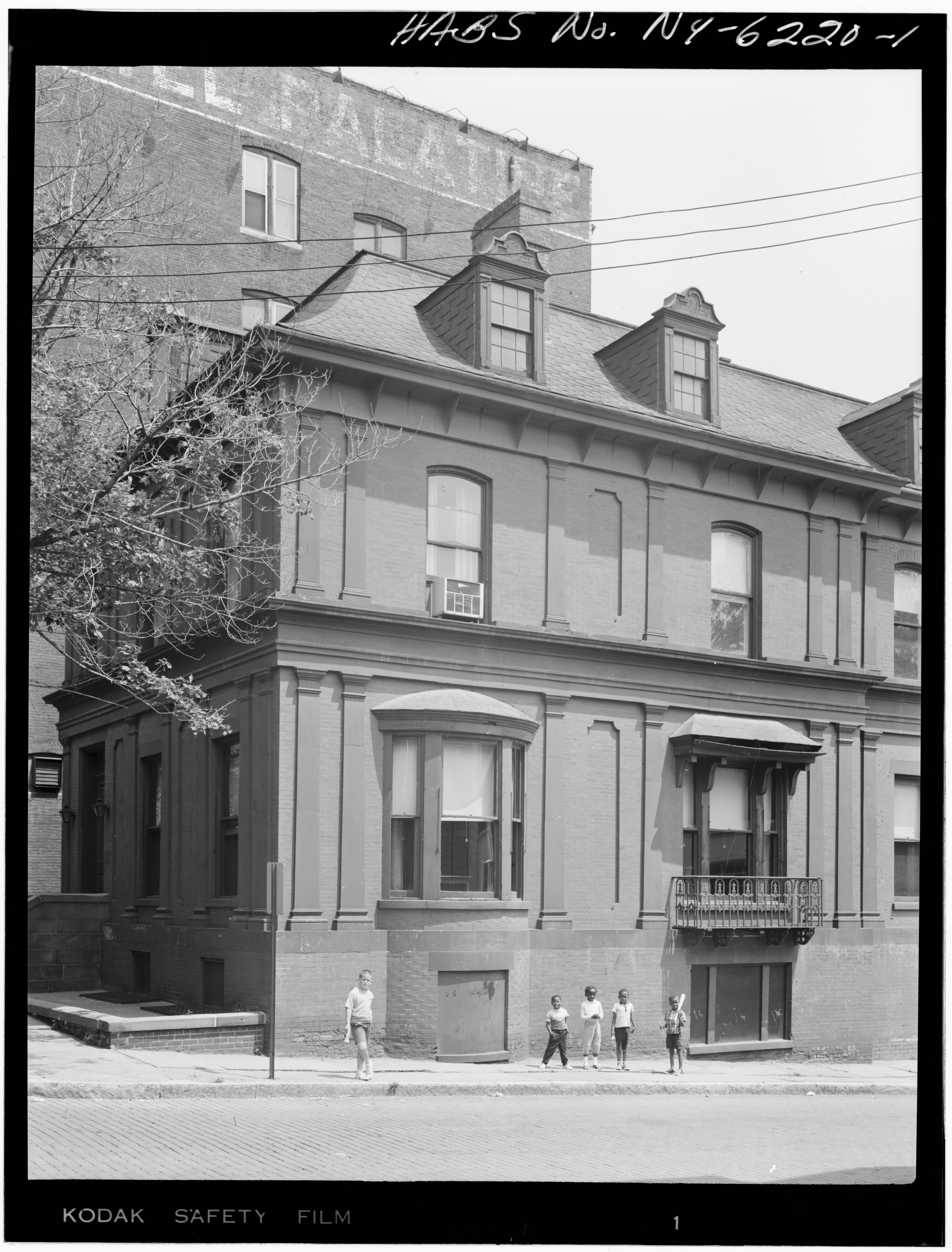
The City Club adjoining the Palatine Hotel, whose faded lettering and windows are visible

In the 1960s, the law library became a valuable resource for local lawyers and judges, open to the public on weekdays from 9 am to 5 pm.

Following the December 1970 demolition of the Palatine, preservationists and the general public resented the Newburgh URA for its apathy. In January 1971, the Orange County Legislature, realizing the situation in Newburgh, petitioned to move the Ninth Judicial Law Library to the new county office building in Goshen. Recognizing this as a possible collusion meant to clear out the City Club for demolition, many were immediately skeptical. Daniel F. Ahearn of the Newburgh Bar Association stood up against the underlying scorn the county had acquired for the city.

Though the City Club itself was not keen on letting the building fall, they only attested a dwindling roster – about 85 men. Club President John S. Steegmuller announced plans for a building renovation, which crumbed by 1973 after facing scrutiny from the URA. In 1975, a member of the club claimed that "Half of the members belong just for the sake of their obituaries – they never come in here." In the first decades of the club's existence, most of the members lived within the city limits, but white flight meant most men had to travel from Balmville or further in the Town of Newburgh into the city, which had become undesirable.

==== First Removal Plans (1971) ====
On February 11, 1971, the legislature set a vote to remove the library, a measure sponsored by George R. Bartlett, Jr., R-Walden, chairman of the County Protective Educational Services Committee. County Executive Louis V. Mills had announced on January 8 that the county contributed $8,000 annually to the library, dispelling local claims that it was an autonomous institution. Bartlett wanted Orange County judges to have more convenient access to the materials, and all operations had been centralized in Goshen by October 1970. Ahearn contested the county, additionally because court terms at the City Courthouse had been absent in 1970; the undersheriff office in the city also closed. As no terms had yet been scheduled for 1971, his claim had grounds, and the association's attorney, Bernard Loth, encouraged Ahearn to fight for more terms. The progress of Courthouse Square, the only semi-successful Urban Renewal project in the city, was expected to protect the law library. Due to the county being tied with the developers of the project, Loth also feared tension with the county would induce removal of the City Club.

Sketches for Courthouse Square, or "Plaza" depicted the building intact beside a large public plaza on the site of the Palatine Hotel. Architectural firm Marvel, Whitfield and Remick, based in Newburgh, were responsible for the tentative plans, commissioned originally for $16,000 by Mills. County involvement was for the sake of possible additions to the 1841 Thornton Niven-designed City Courthouse, which served the eastern part of the county. These new additions would replace an older one, known colloquially as the "Law Building" but called by lawyers the Brewster Building after Eugene Augustus Brewster. They would also hold the law library in addition to various social services, now held in the New York State Armory on Broadway.

One of the project's successes was the completion of a Brutalist building to house the Newburgh Free Library and Board of Education, placed on the plaza; it originally had been placed on the site of the current parking lot.

At the February convening of the legislature, Ahearn arrived with a bargain, claiming that Newburgh mayor George McKneally would be able to convince the city council to pay $5,000 rent to keep the law library where it was. Backed by a state-appointed board of trustees, the library agreed to donate federal reports to the separate, county-operated library. Bartlett postponed action on his resolution to March as Ahearn and the Bar Association sorted matters out. In March, after the legislature's difficulty in legally removing the library from the City Club, they called upon the State Legislature for assistance. Bartlett, not swayed by Ahearn's offer, reminded the legislature that the county could not afford two libraries. A 4-5 vote caused indecision within the library board of trustees, and the situation lost its forward movement.

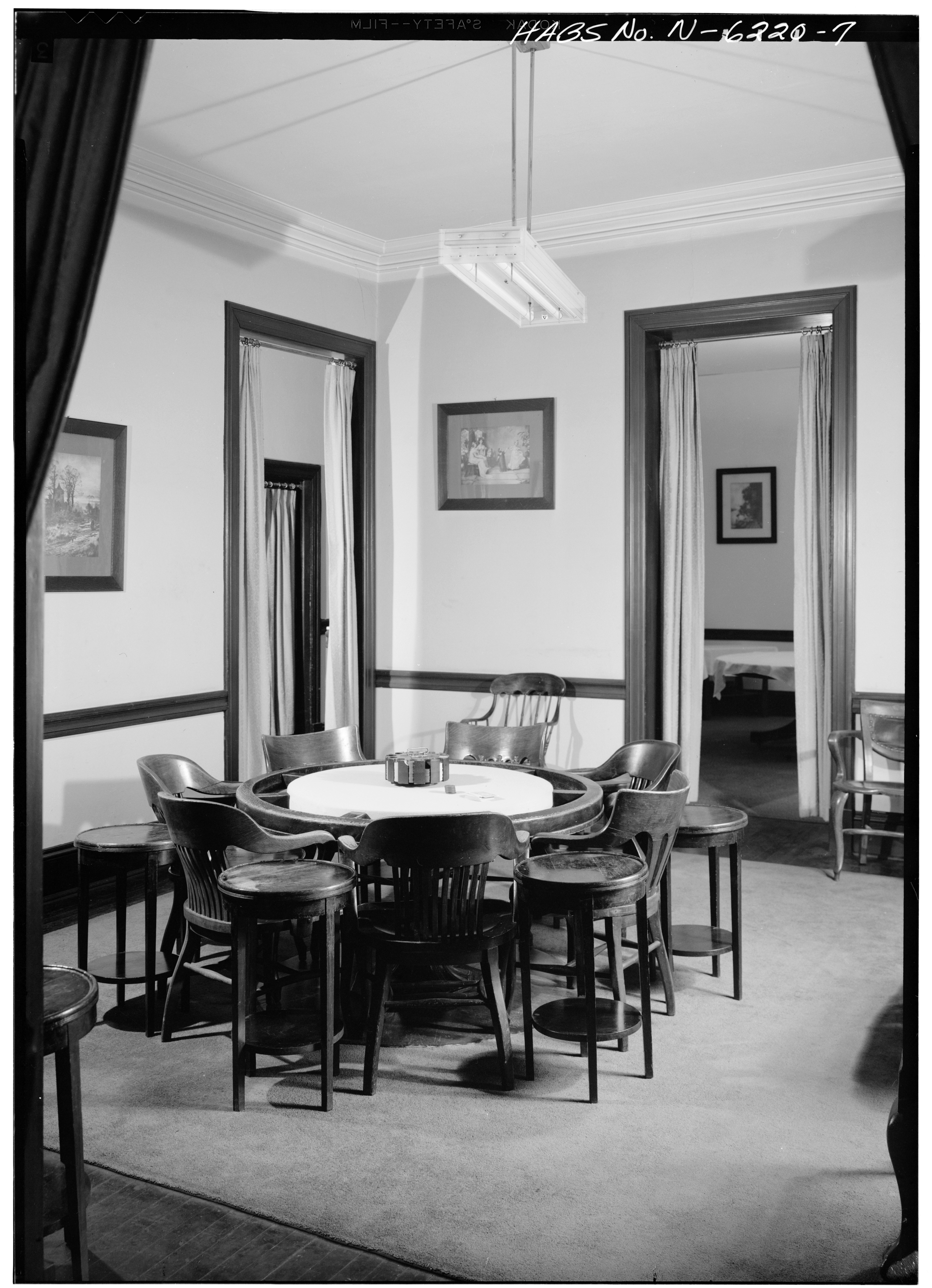
Poker room

By involving the Board of Education, the City Club's inclusion in the plans for Courthouse Square ultimately saved it for the time being. As plans for the new building underwent consideration, Ahearn even proposed that the library be partly contained within the Newburgh Free Library, serving as one complete library for public use. Others believed that the legal literature would be too difficult to access removed from its reach of the law librarians.

==== Eviction and Preservation (1972 - 1976) ====
Out of the URA's hands, the Board of Education undertook responsibility for the City Club, perceived as the monitor for all Courthouse Square dealings. Just as the Bar Association had faith in the Board of Education, it took four years for them to decide on a definite fate for the building. They chose demolition, as it "offended the eye." In its place, they wanted an unobstructed view of the library, and planned to landscape the 45" x 122" land with taxpayer dollars, in addition to the $30,000 demolition cost.

Elsie Moores Pyburn, a consistent supporter of historic preservation in Newburgh, formed Historic Ventures, Inc. after the success of Elizabeth Lyon on Montgomery Street in 1974. With the help of Lyon, Pyburn also formed the general Committee for Saving the City Club, which received anonymous support via donations. In October 1975, Pyburn and Terri Holbert, representing the Greater Newburgh Arts Council, urged the city to apply for $14,000 of federal funding to rescue the building. With the donations from private individuals, a total of $28,000 could be matched to secure the building from its owners. The City Club, barely using the building except for occasional luncheons, had been served a demolition permit from the city for November 24. The exact reason for the permit at this date is unclear, but likely attributed to pressure from the Board of Education, who would want to begin landscaping in the spring to celebrate the opening of the new library.

City Club members were reluctant to let the building fall, but sale of the land plot to the Board of Education for $30,000 would be enough to liquidate their debts. Rent was paid by the library to upkeep the building, and with the club's forced eviction of their tenant, both groups faced hardship. The library was given 30 days to remove its contents, which were placed temporarily in the unfinished new courthouse addition, where they stayed inaccessible, frustrating lawyers. Steegmuller expressed regret for the situation, and was not entirely appreciative of Pyburn and other preservationists, who he felt arrived at the "last minute", as he and Ahearn had stressed the building's historic significance years earlier.

Pyburn summoned Irish restorer Brian Thompson to assist in her cause. Newly arrived to the city, Thompson was surveying possible abandoned or derelict properties to restore. Pyburn and other native preservationists notified him of the City Club's impending demolition. Agreeing it should be preserved, he was able to lessen the Board of Education's pressure on the demolition, pushing plans back until after the holidays. At a Board Meeting on January 27, 1976, president Murray Cohen gave Thompson six months to restore the building, notifying him it would be torn down if he did not deliver satisfactory results. While he began to plan his restoration, Cohen and school trustees contacted lawyers to ensure the building would not be protected by historic preservation laws. Many supported Thompson's efforts and reasoned that a commercial occupancy could fill the vacant building. Even if Thompson failed, with public support for the City Club's preservation expanding, the National Park Service approved a $14,000 grant the city could use to purchase of the building, which would could then sold to a private developer.

In May, the city council became involved as City Manager James R. Taylor contemplated signing an agreement between Thompson and the Board of Education. The former party had apparently ignored Murray Cohen's request for a new agreement, afraid he had changed his mind. Thompson instead involved the preservationists, who were not legally connected to the agreement in any way, and could be trusted for their support. A new four-part agreement included Thompson, the Board of Education, City Club members, and Taylor. Throughout the process, Thompson avoided entrapping himself.

=== Thompson Building ===
After negotiations with the club's lawyer, Thompson agreed to sign the four-part agreement. The Board and Thompson were not on good terms. Cohen was insulted that Thompson showed reluctance to the agreement, and had eagerly begun his work in March assuming the deal would work itself out.

On June 1, the new law library in the courthouse addition opened. The Newburgh Free Library opened on February 2.

As Thompson began to undertake more restoration projects in the city, he began renting out offices within the building, later taking an office for himself. Exterior restoration continued into the summer of 1977, as Thompson had become preoccupied with settling business. Acid was used to remove a maroon-colored paint from the original brick; windows were restored after a cleaning of the exterior took place. Shingling on the mansard roof was replaced, as well as corbels. Interior heating and air conditioning were also added for the new office suites. By September 1978, the Orange County District Attorney, a law firm, and Avon had offices, with an additional one left for a tenant.

Thompson's office displayed photographs of the castles and manor houses he was renowned for restoring in the British Isles, among them Cloghan Castle, his residence in Ireland. A 4" replica of the Thompson family crest hung beside ancestral portraits. In the outside hallway on the second floor hung the Union Jack and Maple Leaf flags; Thompson did not consider himself very American, but once considered obtaining citizenship.

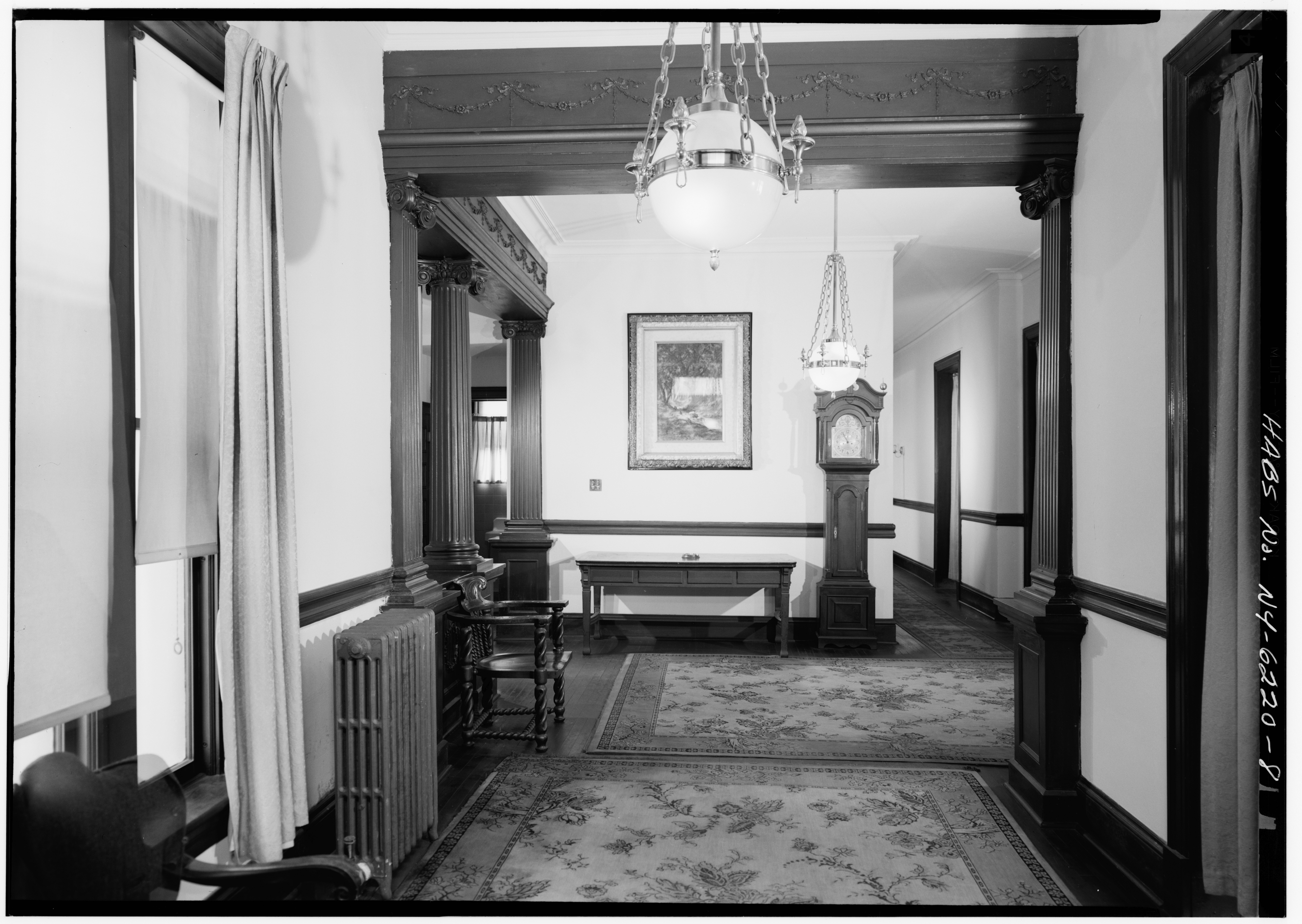
Second floor hallway

Business at the newly-renamed "Thompson Building" was conduced smoothly, assisted by mainly white suburbanites who had been raised in the city but fled with white flight. They conducted Thompson's office work while Blacks and Latinos completed restoration work with Thompson's crew. Due to the superiority of his presence in the city, he suspected that slumlords harbored a disdain for his favor with the city council. Some retaliated against his methods in violent ways. In October 1976, one of his early restoration projects, 235 Montgomery Street, had been firebombed. Months earlier, a fire injured 4 men at his first project, 87 Broad Street, built by Downing's brother. He immediately suspected the work had been that of a disgruntled slumlord. Resentment towards Thompson only worsened.

==== Fire (1981) ====
On December 6, 1981, at approximately 7:00 PM, a fire began at the Thompson Building. Newburgh and New Windsor fire companies rushed to the scene, the street being filled with heavy smoke on arrival. The source of the smoke was identified as the basement, seeping from one of the windows that had been covered with plywood for a decade. Flames rushed through the building between its walls, scorching the attic and beginning a collapse of the roof. Fireman battled the blaze in chilling winds until 3:30 AM, and issues with water pressure in the hoses prolonged the flames. Several fireman were rushed to the hospital for injuries, mainly burns. Immediately, the fire was concluded as being "suspicious" and arson was considered, being that the fire had emerged from two locations. A crowd gathered outside the charred remains on December 7, remarking the great loss. The public formed three theories to explain the mysterious fire.

1. An enemy of Thompson decided to set the building alight over a dispute, hoping to halt restoration efforts by removal of his Newburgh office. A friend of Thompson's penned a letter to the editor, published in The Evening News, titled "Arson in Newburgh" detailing the context of this theory. Instead of welfare recipients or insurance policyholders, thought to be perpetrators of arsons in the historic district, the writer argued that "Only the super-leftist, Maoist-like, anti-preservation extremists enhance their goal by the arson-shrinking of the historic district the goal of frightening preservation out of Newburgh. But they were emboldened to such a feverish combustion rate by a worsening City Hall attitude towards preservation that condones mutilation of the historic district, that belittles restorers, that almost makes acts of brutality against architecture respectable."
2. Thompson committed arson himself because he had incriminating documents stored in the building. This theory is complicated by his efforts to obtain a city tax break a week following the fire. City Councilman Donald Presutti denied Thompson the right to make install payments for 30 of his restoration projects, saying it would set a precedent the city tax base could not handle. Loss of the City Club actually crippled Thompson's efforts, forcing him to beg for exemptions on tax laws.
3. The fire was caused naturally, by faulty wiring, overheating, etc.

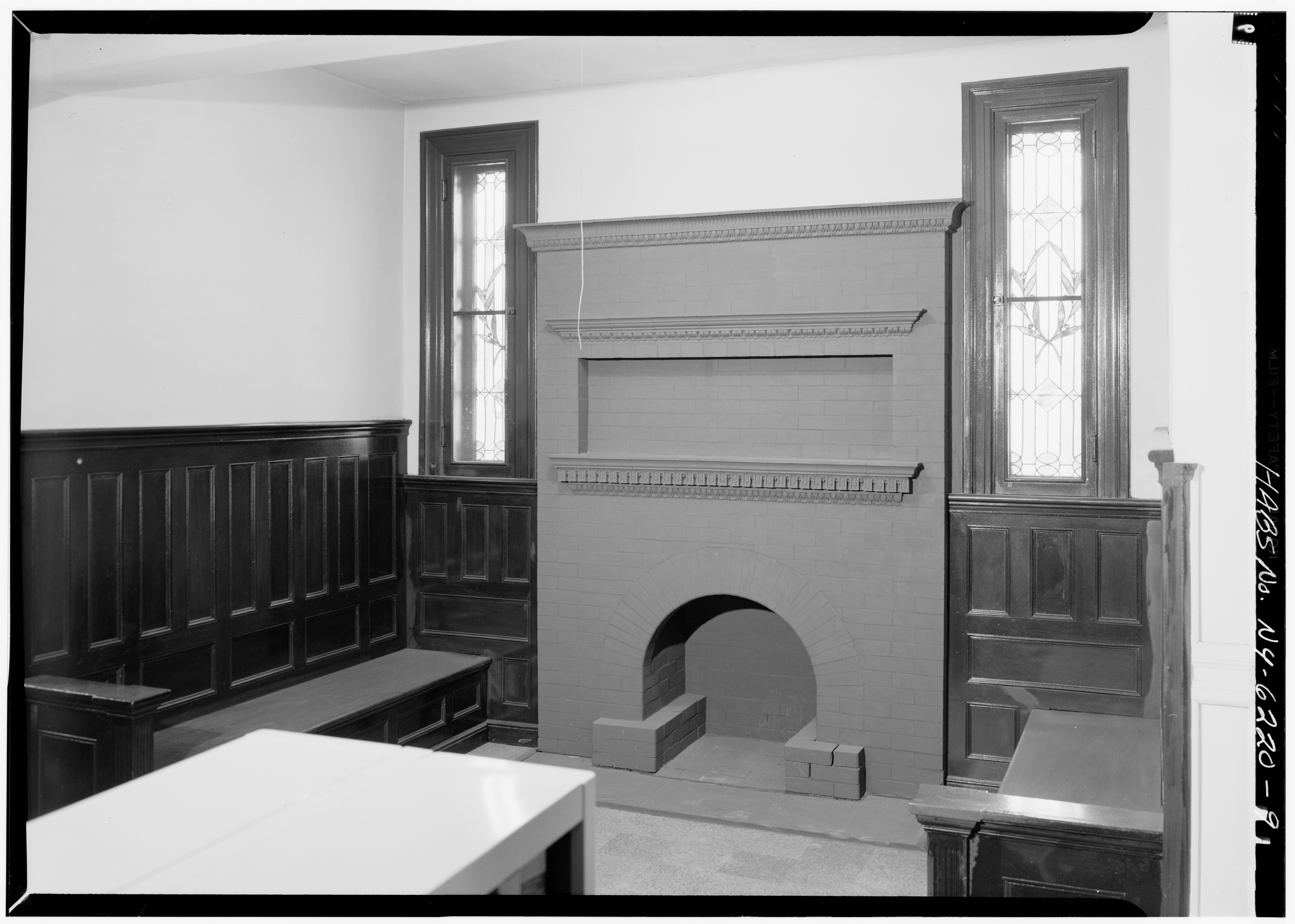
Second floor fireplace niche with stained glass windows

The City Club was mourned for years after the fire, and an architect even completed sketches in 1986, showing interest in possibly restoring it again. Steel beams were placed in between the building's remaining outer brick walls to prevent collapse. Plans to make the building a commercial or mixed use space were developed as late as 2018.

Artist Martin Roth (1977–2019) planned to transform the City Club into a "plant concert" or sound garden using the plants and flowers that have grown throughout the abandoned building. Using bio-sonification, a system that translates the internal frequencies of plants into musical notes, he planned to create an electronic soundscape that shifts as the plants grow or sway in the wind, or if visitors interact with them. His death in 2019 complicated plans for the installation. As of June 2021, curator Kelly Schroer of the Newburgh-based public art organization Strongroom says the project will come to life.
