= York Imperial =

Apple cultivar

Malus pumila 'York Imperial'
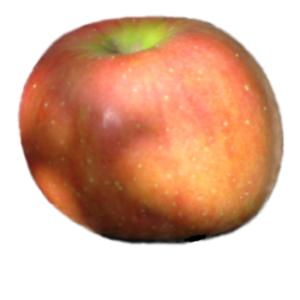
- Genus: Malus
- Species: Malus pumila
- Hybrid parentage: Unknown
- Cultivar: 'York Imperial'
- Origin: York, Pennsylvania, USA

The 'York Imperial', or 'York', is a cultivar of apple (Malus pumila) from which a number of other valuable strains and cultivars have arisen, including four sport varieties: Commander York, Ramey York, Red Yorking, and Yorking.

Most York apples are sold to food processors to be turned into pantry ingredients, such as sauces, cider, and vinegar, rather than sold directly to consumers. Pennsylvania is the top producer of York apples, with 2.7 million out of the 3.7 million bushels produced in 2025 coming from the state; the rest are primarily grown in Virginia and New York.

== History ==
In 1820, Quaker nurseryman Jonathan Jessop (also Jessup) developed this variety of apple on his "Springwood Farm" near York, Pennsylvania, United States, from grafts of a tree from John Kline's farm at Hellam, Pennsylvania. Some sources have reported that Jessop had noticed school children selectively choosing leaf-covered apples that were in a well preserved in the early spring, and later grafted another variety onto it. Though lop-sided, this new cultivar quickly became popular because of its taste and long keeping properties—which were especially important in the era before refrigeration. This cultivar was originally known as 'Jonathan’s Fine Winter' (sometimes reported as 'Johnson’s Fine Winter'), after Jonathan Jessop. Some sources credit John Kline of Hellam and some say it was William Johnson, nearer to York. Kline was reported to be the one who found the apples under the leaves and took them to Jessop, yet Jessop got the credit for the continued development of the apple. Scientific publications credit the long keeping trait to the density of the apple.

In the early 1850s, Andrew Jackson Downing called this apple the “Imperial of Keepers” due to its excellent storage ability. From this moniker, this apple became better known as the 'York Imperial'. Jessop carried the tree to the Friends’ yearly meeting in Baltimore, Maryland, and from there the tree first spread into Virginia. Jessop carried York Imperial trees to several other Friends’ meetings.

A distinct yet closely related variety, the 'Spencerville Red', was discovered in 1992 growing in a field in Spencerville, Maryland. The 'Spencerville Red' ripens about a week after the 'York Imperial' and is also lop-sided. The 'Spencerville Red' is thought to be a cross between the 'York Imperial' and a crab apple.

== Characteristics ==
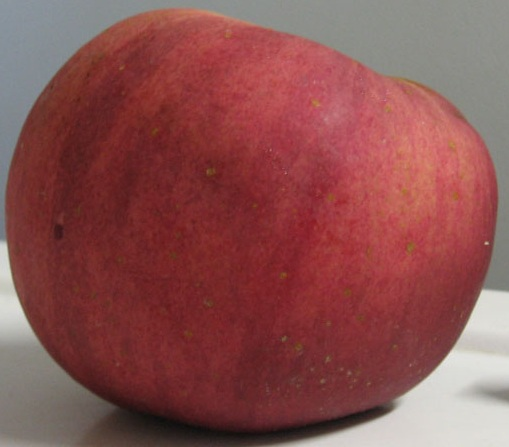
A 'York Imperial' apple

The 'York Imperial' is easily identified by its lop-sided shape. It is consistently one of the top-ten-selling apple varieties. The fruit is medium to large, and varies from an oblate-oblique shape to an oval-oblong shape, and the skins are deep red with greenish-yellow streaks and specks, as well as occasional patches of yellow or green. It can be streaked with grayish scarfskin. 'York Imperial' apples ripen in October and are harvested through December.

This cultivar has a tart yet sweet taste, and keeps extremely well, becoming sweeter and mellower-tasting over time. It sweetens in flavor for 5–6 months after it is picked. The York Imperial is excellent for baking, cooking, apple sauce, cider, preserves, jams, dried apple slices, and juice, as well as eating fresh. It quickly spread from Pennsylvania southward into Virginia. A properly cared for mature tree can average 20 bushels a year. The 'York Imperial' is one of the few apple cultivars to have survived for 180 years. It is still commonly grown in orchards and backyards in the continental United States, especially Pennsylvania, Virginia, and North Carolina. It was often exported to Europe before import restrictions were implemented.

In addition to its native region of south-central Pennsylvania, the 'York Imperial' is now also grown along the Shenandoah Valley and the Blue Ridge Mountains.

== Disease susceptibility ==
- Scab: high
- Powdery mildew: high
- Cedar apple rust: high
- Fire blight: high

== Recognition ==
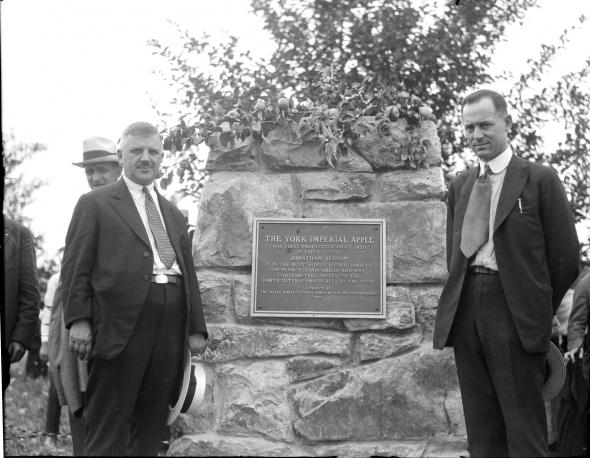
Dedication of a Pennsylvania historical marker in 1920 on Jessop's farm

In 1920, the State Horticultural Society of Pennsylvania dedicated a marker to the 'York Imperial' apple for its contributions "to the horticultural prosperity of the state." The Apple Hill Medical Center now sits on part of the Jessop farm. A bronze plaque on the medical center's lower level reads:

"THE YORK IMPERIAL APPLE Was First Propagated About 1820 In This Field By JONATHAN JESSOP It Is the Most Widely Known Variety of Pennsylvania Origin and Has Contributed Largely to the Horticultural Prosperity of the State A Tribute by The State Horticultural Association of Pennsylvania 1920"

A blue historical marker with yellow writing is located at South George St (SR 3001, old US 111), two miles south of York, erected on April 5, 1948, recognizing the 'York Imperial' that says “YORK IMPERIAL APPLE Here, at a nursery located on Springwood Farms, a new variety of apple was propagated by Jonathan Jessop in 1820. In 1855 it was named the "York Imperial", earning the appellation "Imperial" for its keeping quality, not its flavor. It became a leading variety grown in the U.S.”
