= Andrew Jackson Downing =

American landscape designer & horticulturalist (1815–1852)

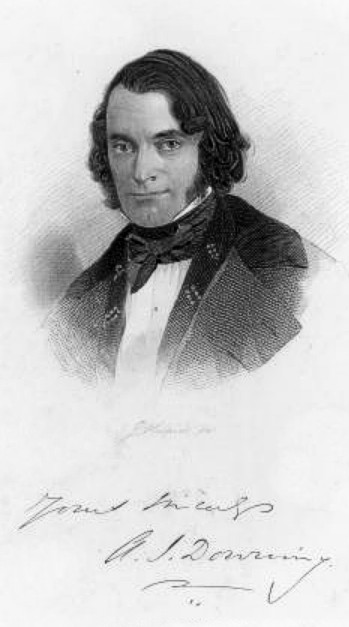
- Born: October 31, 1815; Newburgh, New York, US
- Died: July 28, 1852 (aged 36); Hudson River, New York, US
- Resting place: Cedar Hill Cemetery, Newburgh, New York
- Occupations: Landscape gardener (later to be called landscape architect), horticulturist
- Known for: Contributions to Gothic Revival architecture, first major American landscaper
- Style: Carpenter Gothic, Gothic Revival, Italianate
- Spouse: Caroline DeWint Downing (1815–1905)

Andrew Jackson Downing (October 31, 1815 – July 28, 1852) was an American landscape designer, horticulturist, writer, prominent advocate of the Gothic Revival in the United States, and editor of The Horticulturist magazine (1846–1852). Downing is considered to be a founder of American landscape architecture.

== Early life ==
Downing was born in Newburgh, New York, to Samuel Downing, a wheelwright and later nurseryman, and Eunice Bridge. After finishing his schooling at sixteen, he worked in his father's nursery in the Town of Newburgh, and gradually became interested in landscape gardening and architecture. He began writing on botany and landscape gardening and then undertook to educate himself thoroughly in these subjects. He married Caroline DeWint, daughter of John Peter DeWint, in 1838.

== Professional career ==
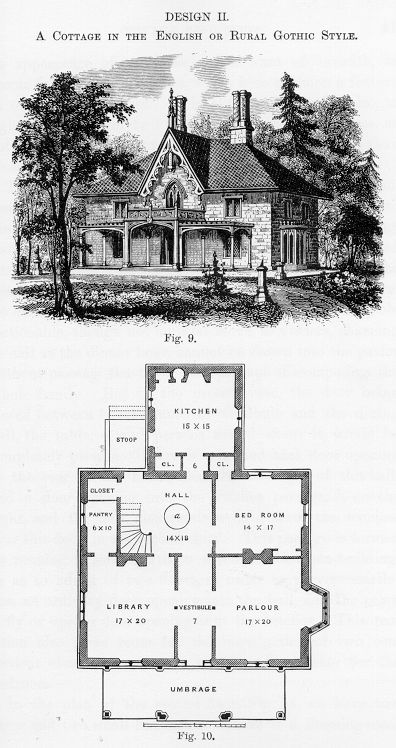
Design II, English or Rural Gothic style, Cottage Residences, 1842

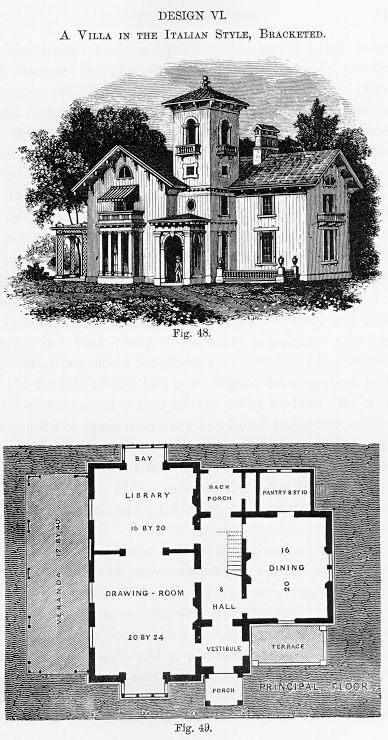
Design VI, Italian style, Cottage Residences, 1842

His official writing career started when he began producing articles for newspapers and horticultural journals in the 1830s. In 1841 his first book, A Treatise on the Theory and Practice of Landscape Gardening, Adapted to North America, was published to a great success; it was the first book of its kind published in the United States. In the book, Downing talked about landscape architecture - or landscape gardening - in a way to encourage civility through the care for nature in a domestic scale. Showing that nature can be beautiful and also morally beneficial.

In 1842 Downing collaborated with Alexander Jackson Davis on the book Cottage Residences, a highly influential pattern book of houses that mixed romantic architecture with the English countryside's pastoral picturesque, derived in large part from the writings of John Claudius Loudon. The book was widely read and consulted, spreading the so-called "Carpenter Gothic" and Hudson River Bracketed architectural styles among Victorian builders, both commercial and private.

In this early stage of his career, Downing also engineered landscapes and provided horticultural makeovers to patrons throughout the Northeast.

With his brother Charles, he wrote Fruits and Fruit Trees of America (1845), long a standard work. In the early 1850s, Downing called the "Jonathan's Fine Winter" apple the "Imperial of Keepers", which led to it being renamed the York Imperial apple. This was followed by The Architecture of Country Houses (1850), a revolutionary and influential pattern book that marked the end of his collaboration with Davis. Completing extensive drawings for interiors and furniture, Davis's talents as an artist engaged readers and served as early reference guides for homeowners to decorate their own spaces without hiring additional designers.

By the mid-1840s Downing's reputation and celebrity were established. This brought a friendship with Luther Tucker, publisher and printer of Albany, New York, who hired Downing to edit a new journal. "The Horticulturist and Journal of Rural Art and Rural Taste" was first published under Downing's editorship in the summer of 1846; he remained editor of this journal until his death in 1852. The journal was his principal influence on society through horticulture, pomology, botany, entomology, rural architecture, landscape gardening, and, unofficially, public welfare in various forms. It was in this journal that Downing first argued for a New York Park, which in time became Central Park. In it, Downing argued for state agricultural schools, which eventually gave rise. Downing worked to educate and influence his readers in his view of refined taste regarding architecture, landscape design, and even moral issues. In 1845, Downing was elected into the National Academy of Design as an Honorary Academician.

In 1850, as Downing traveled to England, an exhibition of continental landscape watercolors by Englishman Calvert Vaux captured his attention. He encouraged Vaux to emigrate to the United States, and opened what was to be a thriving practice in Newburgh. Downing and Vaux worked together from fall 1850 until Downing's death in the summer of 1852. Together they designed many significant architecture and landscape projects. They designed and remodeled Hudson Valley residences for the historian Joel T. Headley, China Trade merchant Warren Delano, and brewer Matthew Vassar. As the firm took on more residential projects, Downing hired Frederick Clarke Withers (1828–1901) from London, who joined the firm as a draftsman in early 1852. Their most prestigious landscape commissions were the grounds of the White House and the Smithsonian Institution in Washington D.C. Vaux's work on the Smithsonian inspired an article he wrote for The Horticulturist, in which he stated his view that it was time the government should recognize and support the arts.

=== Smithsonian Grounds ===
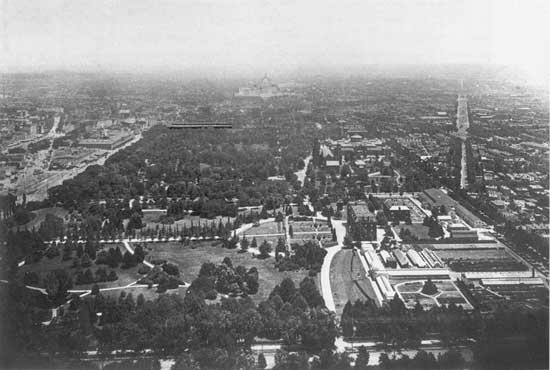
Looking east from the top of the Washington Monument towards the National Mall and the United States Capitol in the summer of 1901. The Mall exhibited the landscape of winding paths and seemingly random plantings that Downing had designed in the early 1850s.

In 1846, the Smithsonian Institution was established, and soon a building to house the new institution was started on the National Mall in Washington, D.C. James Renwick's Norman-style building stimulated a move to landscape the Mall in a manner consistent with the romantic character of the Smithsonian's building. President Millard Fillmore commissioned Downing to create a plan that would redeem the Mall from its physical neglect.

Downing presented his plan for the National Mall to the Regents of the Smithsonian Institution on February 27, 1851. The plan was a radical departure from the geometric, classical design for the Mall that Pierre (Peter) Charles L'Enfant had placed in his 1791 plan for the future federal capital city (see L'Enfant Plan). Instead of L'Enfant's "Grand Avenue," Downing envisioned four individual parks, with connecting curvilinear walks and drives defined with trees of various types. Downing's objective was to form a national park that would serve as a model for the nation, as an influential example of the "natural style of landscape gardening" and as a "public museum of living trees and shrubs."

President Fillmore endorsed two-thirds of Downing's plan in 1851, but Congress found it to be too expensive and released only enough funds to develop the area around the Smithsonian. In 1853, Congress cut off all funds so that the plan was never entirely completed. However, federal agencies developed several naturalistic parks within the Mall over the next half century in accordance with Downing's plan. The parks remained until replaced by features that the McMillan Plan of 1902 described (see History of the National Mall).

=== Completed architectural works with Vaux ===
- Joel T. Headley House, "Cedar Lawn," New Windsor, New York (1850–1851)
- Matthew Vassar Cottage and gatehouse, "Springside," Poughkeepsie, New York (1850)
- Remodel of Warren Delano House, "Algonac," Newburgh, New York (1851), burned and rebuilt
- William L. Findlay House, Newburgh, New York (1850–1851), demolished
- Robert P. Dodge House, Washington, D.C. (c.1851–1853)
- Francis Dodge House, Washington, DC (c.1851–1853)
- David Moore House, Newburgh, New York (1851–1852)
- Dr. William A. M. Culbert House, Newburgh, New York (1851–1852), burned with only exteriors walls remaining as of 2026
- Daniel Parish House, Newport, Rhode Island (1852), burned and rebuilt
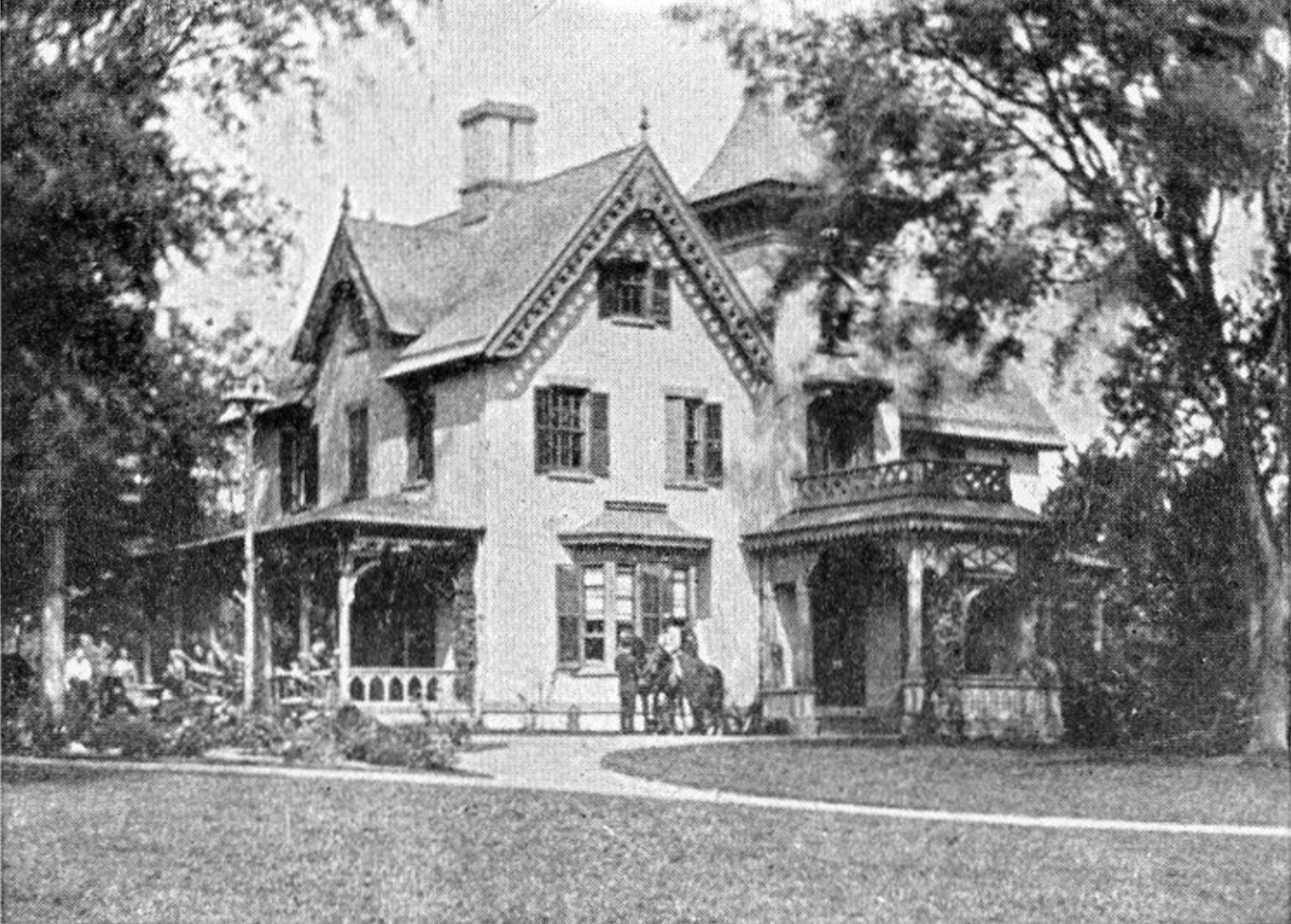
Joel T. Headley House (1850–1851)

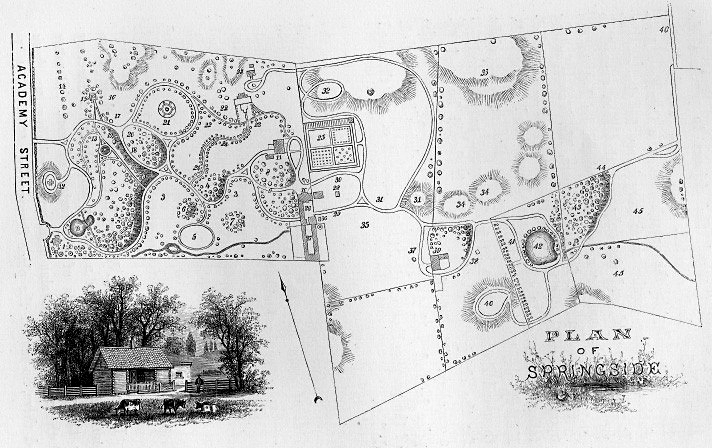
Springside landscape design (1850)

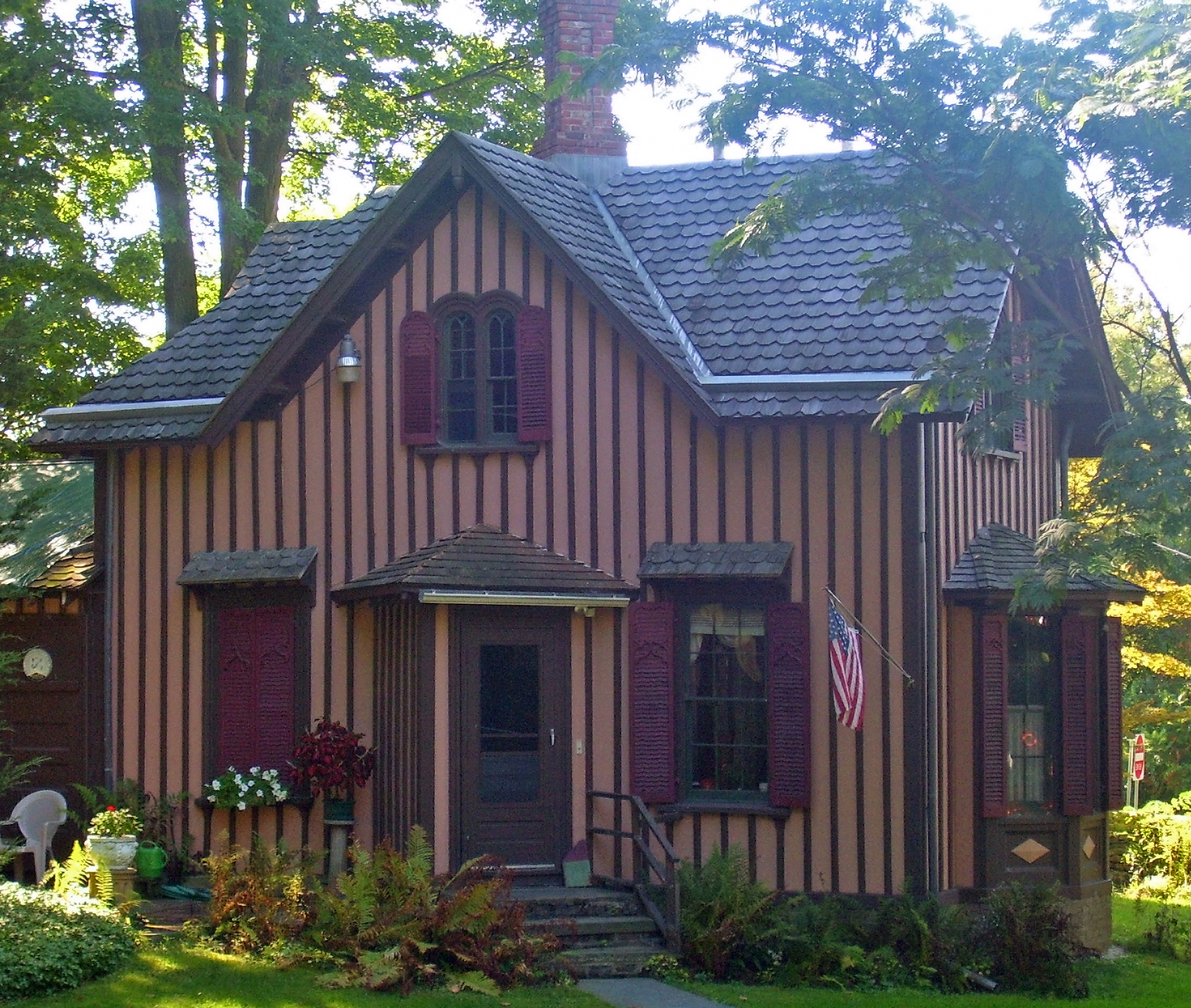
Springside gatehouse (1850)

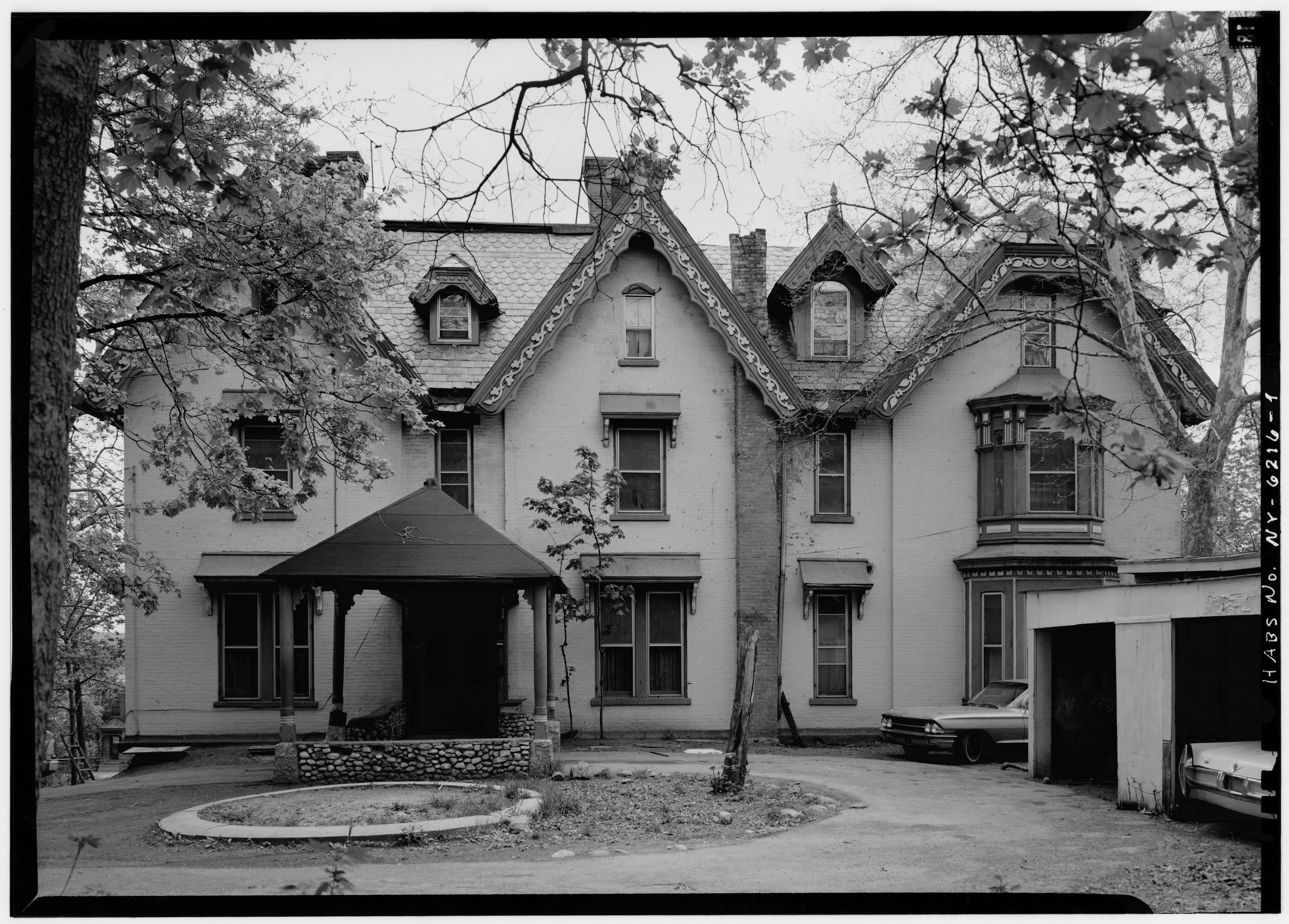
David Moore House (1851)

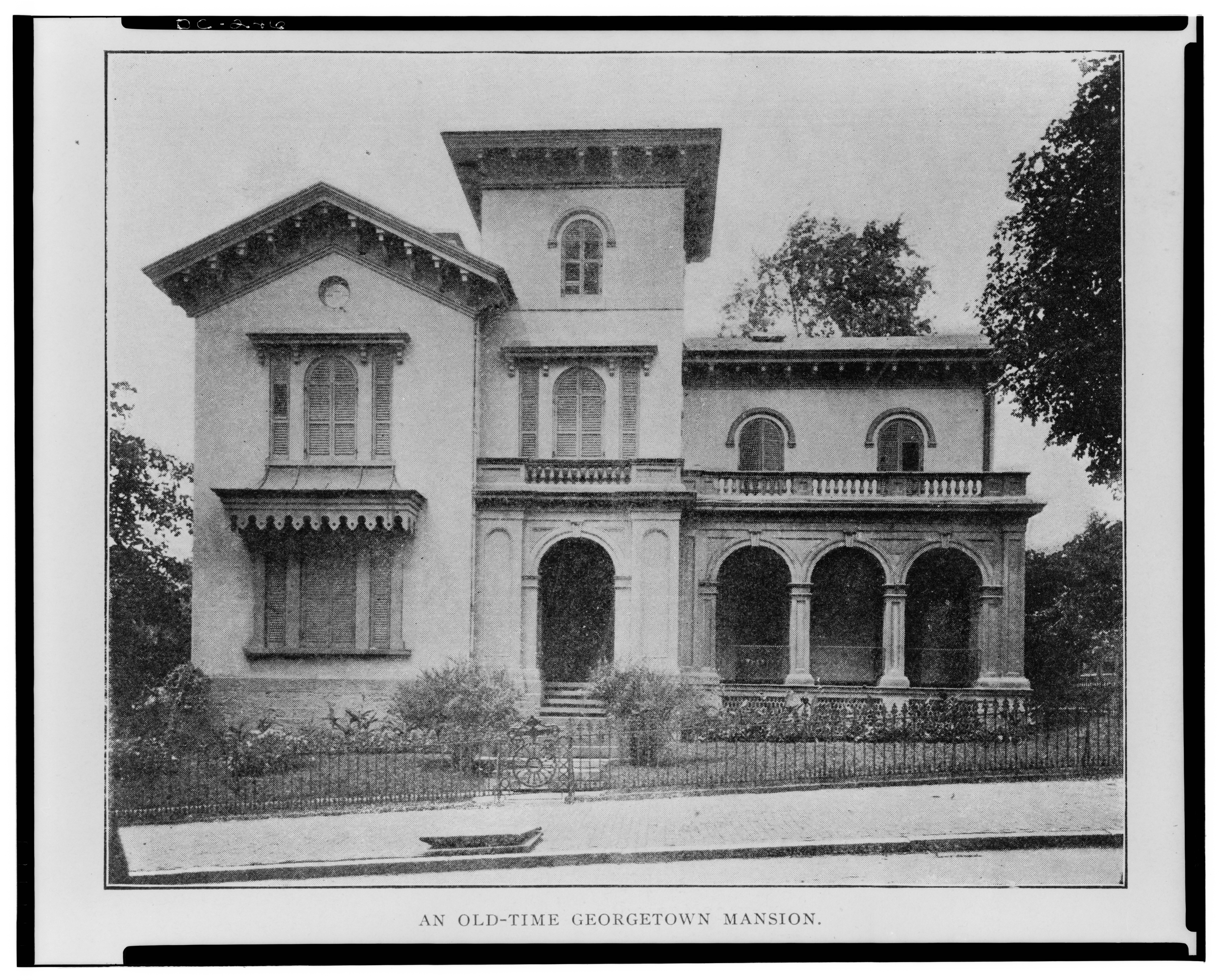
Robert P. Dodge House (c. 1851–53)

== Downing's philosophy ==
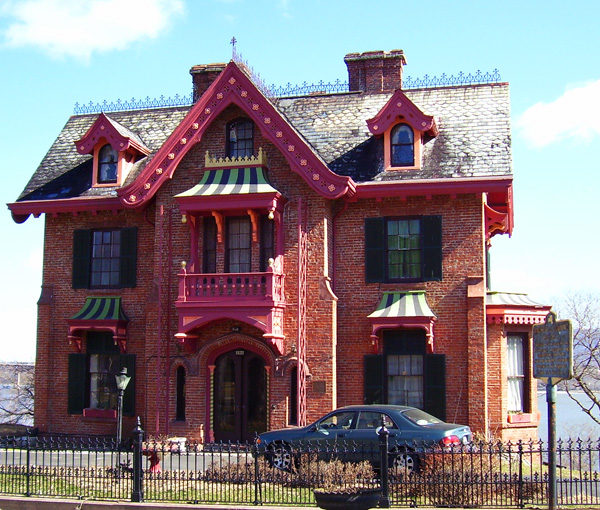
The villa-style Warren House by Calvert Vaux is often associated with Downing, because it exemplifies many of his design theories from Cottage Residences

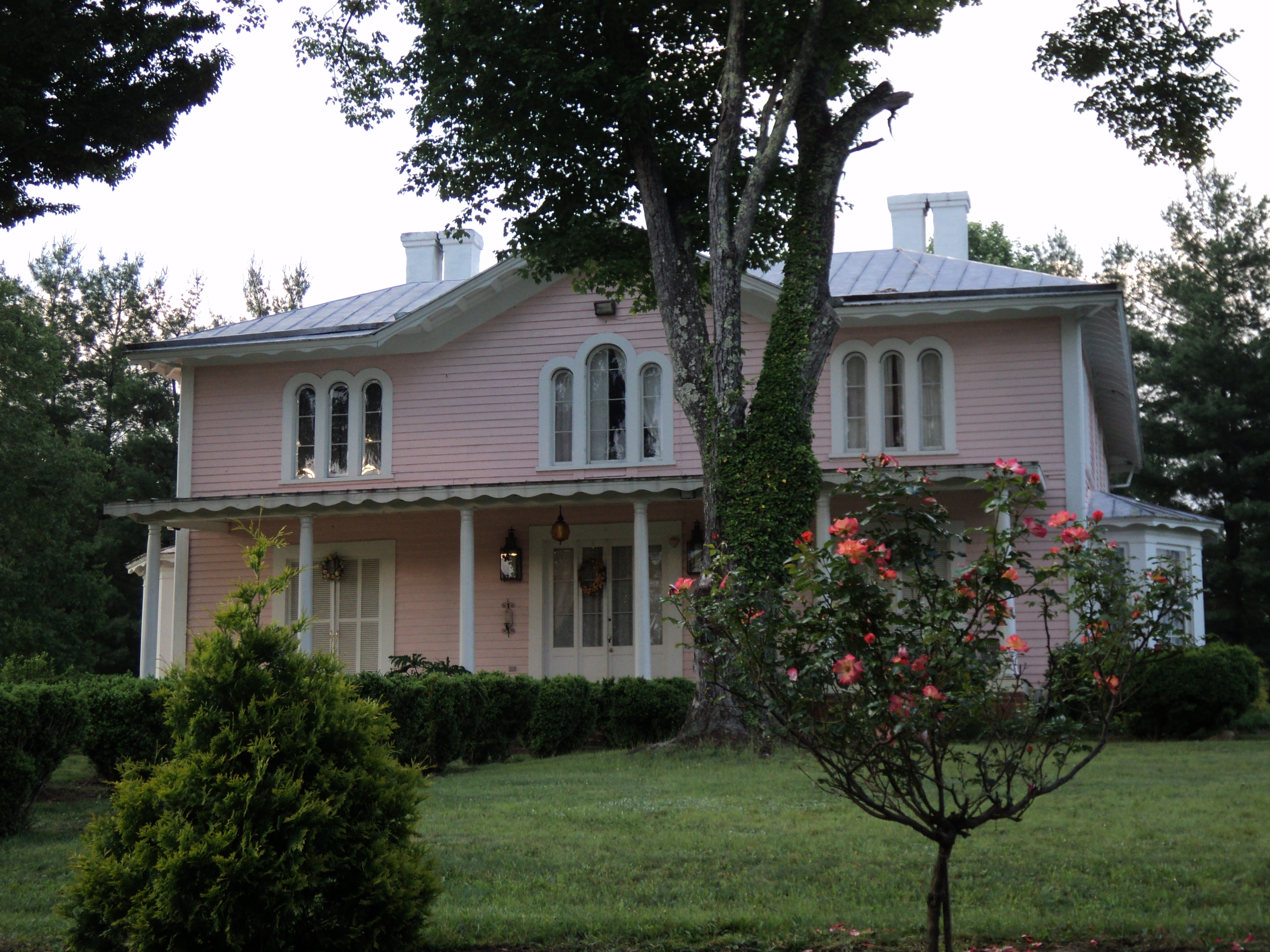
Aurora, Penn's Store, Patrick County, Virginia. Built in 1853 and Influenced by Downing's designs (Italianate)

- People's pride in their country is connected to pride in their home. If they can decorate and build their homes to symbolize the values they hope to embody, such as prosperity, education and patriotism, they will be happier people and better citizens.
- "A good house will lead to a good civilization."
- The "individual home has a great value to a people."
- "There is a moral influence in a country home."
- A good home will encourage its inhabitants to pursue a moral existence.

== Architectural influence ==
Downing developed his view that country residences should fit into the surrounding landscape and blend with its natural habitat. He also believed that architecture should be functional and that designs for residences should be both beautiful and functional. In the beginning of his Architecture of Country Houses is a lengthy essay on the real meaning of architecture. He wrote that even the simplest form of architecture should be an expression of beauty, but the design should never neglect the useful for the beautiful. He went on to say that "(in) perfect architecture no principle of utility will be sacrificed to beauty, only elevated and ennobled by it." He considered landscape gardening and architecture to be an art.

In Cottage Residences he published the designs for 28 houses; in addition to the house plans, the designs included the plans for the gardens, orchards, and grounds including plants to be used. In his Architecture of Country Houses, he included designs for cottages, farmhouses, and villas and commented on interiors, furniture and the best methods of warming and ventilating them. Some of his designs were simple and affordable so that all classes of society could enjoy life outside the city. In his publication, he criticized the builders who borrowed architectural elements to imitate villa style in a cottage as having poor taste. Examples of such were temple cottage where a portico with large wooden columns were added to a small cottage, cocked-hat cottage where many gables were added to fill the cottage roof, and improper use of ornamental parts such as using "gingerbread" look sawn-out thin board instead of a properly carved-out vergeboard.

== Death ==
On July 28, 1852, Downing was traveling on the steamer Henry Clay with his wife and extended family. A fire broke out amidships when the ship was just south of Yonkers, New York, on the Hudson River. A boiler explosion quickly spread flames across the wooden vessel and Downing was killed along with 80 others. A few ashen remains and his clothes were recovered days later.

Downing's remains were interred first in Old Town Cemetery, but later transferred to Cedar Hill Cemetery, in his birthplace of Newburgh, New York.

Following Downing's death, Withers and Vaux took over his architectural practice. After his death, writer and friend Nathaniel Parker Willis referred to Downing as "our country's one solitary promise of a supply for [the]... scarcity of beauty coin in our every-day pockets. He was the one person who could be sent for... to look at fields and woods and tell what could be made out of them".

== Legacy ==
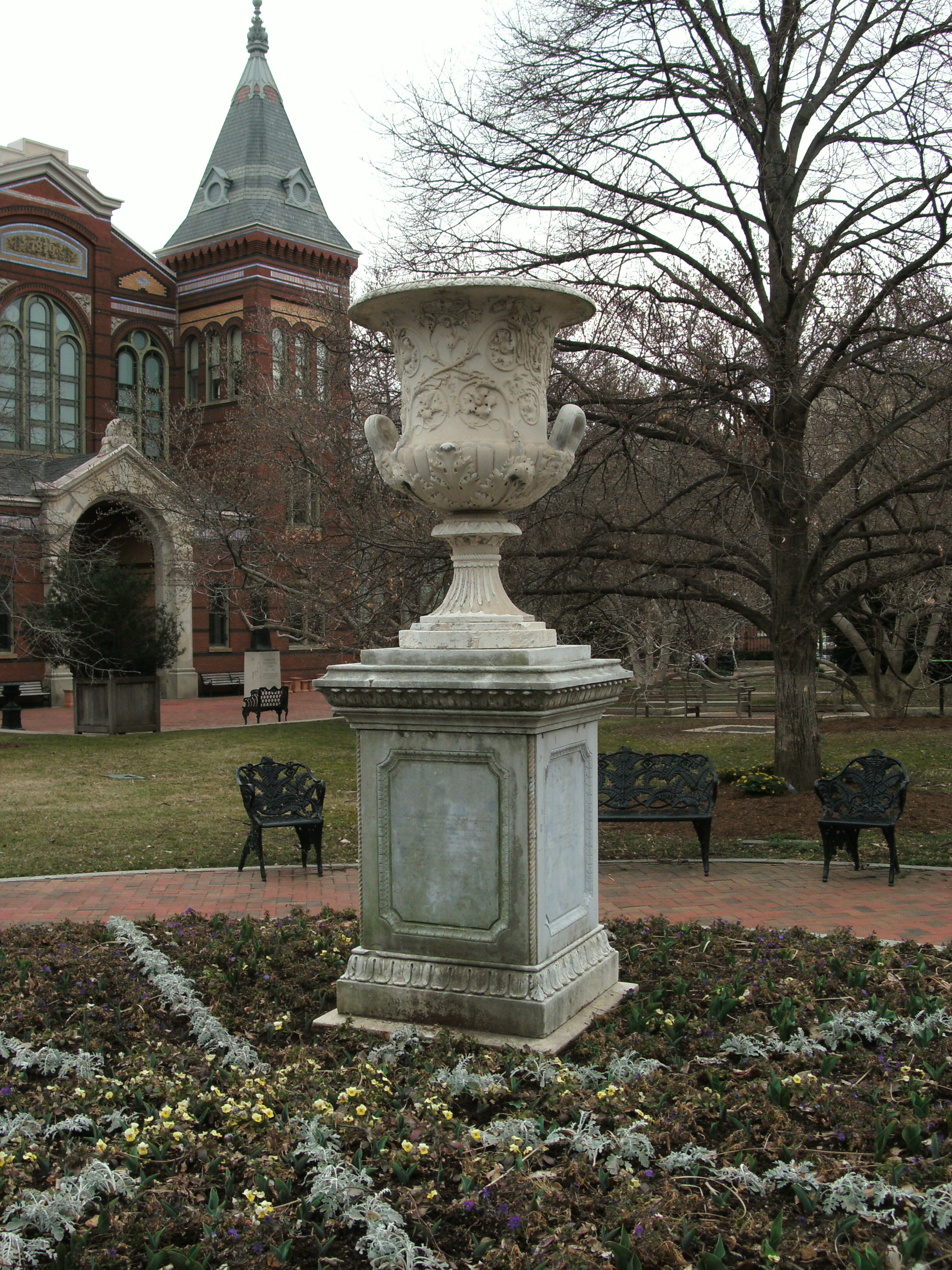
Memorial urn to Downing located in the Enid A. Haupt Garden of the Smithsonian Institution

Downing influenced not only Vaux but also landscape architect Frederick Law Olmsted; the two men met at Downing's home in Newburgh. In 1858, their joint design, the Greensward Plan, was selected in a design competition for the new Central Park in New York City. In 1860, Olmsted and Vaux proposed that a bust of Downing be placed in the new park as an "appropriate acknowledgment of the public indebtedness to the labors of the late A. J. Downing, of which we feel the Park itself is one of the direct results." The monument was never built in the park, but a memorial urn honoring Downing stands in the Enid A. Haupt Garden near the Smithsonian Castle (see Andrew Jackson Downing Urn).

The most intact structure designed by Downing is his house for Joel T. Headley, "Cedar Lawn," in New Windsor, New York, one of his first collaborations with Vaux. Other few surviving structures include the David Moore House and Dr. William A. M. Culbert House in Newburgh, however, both are altered or ruinous. Exemplifying his original vision is the gatehouse at Matthew Vassar's estate, "Springside" in Poughkeepsie, New York. The gatehouse and the estate's gardens designed by Downing are a National Historic Landmark.

Downing's wife and friends of the family built a monument to Downing in the shape of an urn that was at his home in Newburgh. They inscribed on it words that he had written "Plant spacious parks in your cities, and loose their gates as wide as the morning, to the whole people."

Another of Downing's surviving structures in the Italianate style, the Robert Dodge House, which stands today in Georgetown, D.C., significantly altered. The Dodge House was an exact opposite of the Francis Dodge House, also a Downing and Vaux design, aside from the windows, fenestration, and decorative ornaments.

In 1889, the city of Newburgh commissioned a park design from Olmsted and Vaux. They accepted, on the condition that it be named after their former mentor. It opened in 1897, called "Downing Park". It was their last collaboration.

Botanist John Torrey named the genus Downingia after Downing.

== Selected works ==
- A Treatise on the Theory and Practice of Landscape Gardening, Adapted to North America, 1841.
- Cottage Residences: or, A Series of Designs for Rural Cottages and Adapted to North America, 1842; reprinted as Andrew Jackson Downing, Victorian Cottage Residences, Dover Publications, 1981.
- The Fruits and Fruit-trees of America: Or, The Culture, Propagation, and Management, in the Garden and Orchard, of Fruit-trees Generally: with Descriptions of All the Finest Varieties of Fruit, Native and Foreign, Cultivated in this Country, 1847.
- The Architecture of Country Houses: Including Designs for Cottages, and Farm-Houses and Villas, With Remarks on Interiors, Furniture, and the best Modes of Warming and Ventilating, D. Appleton & Company, 1850; reprinted as Andrew Jackson Downing, The Architecture of Country Houses, Dover Publications, 1969.
- "On the Moral Influence of Good Houses". 2. Horticulturist. February 1818. pp. 345–47. Archived from the original on July 6, 2010.

== Sources ==
- Beveridge, Charles E.; Schulyer, David, eds. (1983). The Papers of Frederick Law Olmsted: Creating Central Park, 1857–1861. Vol. III. Baltimore: Johns Hopkins University Press. ISBN 978-0801827518.
- Bradley, Barrie Scardino (2014). Houston's Hermann Park: A Century of Community. College Station, TX: Texas A&M Press. ISBN 978-1-62349-036-2.
- Culbertson, Margaret (1999). Texas Houses Built by the Book: The Use of Published Designs, 1850–1925. College Station, TX: Texas A&M University Press. ISBN 0-89096-863-2.
- Rosenzweig, Roy; Blackmar, Elizabeth (1994). The Park and the People: A History of Central Park. Ithaca, NY: Cornell University Press. ISBN 978-0801497513.
- Hansen, Kris A. (2004). Death Passage on the Hudson: The Wreck of the Henry Clay. Fleishmanns, NY: Purple Mountain Press. ISBN 1-930098-56-1.
- Major, Judith K. (1997). To Live in the New World: A. J. Downing and American Landscape Gardening. Cambridge, MA: MIT Press. ISBN 0-262-13331-8.
- Schuyler, David (1996). Apostle of Taste: Andrew Jackson Downing, 1815–1852. Baltimore: Johns Hopkins University Press. ISBN 0-8018-5229-3.
- Sean T. Wright, Railroad and Suburb Development Historian. Descendant of the Nathan Carruth Family and Frank L. Wright Family.
