= Thomas McKissock =

American politician (1790–1866)

Member of the U.S. House of Representatives from New York's 9th district
- In office March 4, 1849 – March 3, 1851
- Preceded by: Daniel B. St. John
- Succeeded by: William Murray

Personal details
- Born: April 17, 1790 Montgomery, New York, U.S.
- Died: June 26, 1866 (aged 76) Saint Andrew, New York, U.S.
- Resting place: Old Town Cemetery, Newburgh, New York, U.S.
- Party: Whig
- Profession: Politician, lawyer

Thomas McKissock (April 17, 1790 – June 26, 1866) was a U.S. representative from New York.

Born in Montgomery, New York, McKissock studied medicine and law. He was admitted to the bar and commenced practice in Newburgh, New York. He was appointed a puisne justice of the State supreme court in 1847.

McKissock was elected as a Whig to the Thirty-first Congress (March 4, 1849 – March 3, 1851). He was an unsuccessful candidate for reelection in 1850 to the Thirty-second Congress. He died in St. Andrews, Orange County, New York, June 26, 1866. He was interred in Old Town Cemetery, Newburgh, New York.

== Sources ==
- United States Congress. "Thomas McKissock (id: M000529)". Biographical Directory of the United States Congress.

U.S. House of Representatives
Preceded by Daniel B. St. John	Member of the U.S. House of Representatives from New York's 9th congressional district March 4, 1849 – March 3, 1851	Succeeded by William Murray
