= William Murray (New York politician) =

American politician from New York

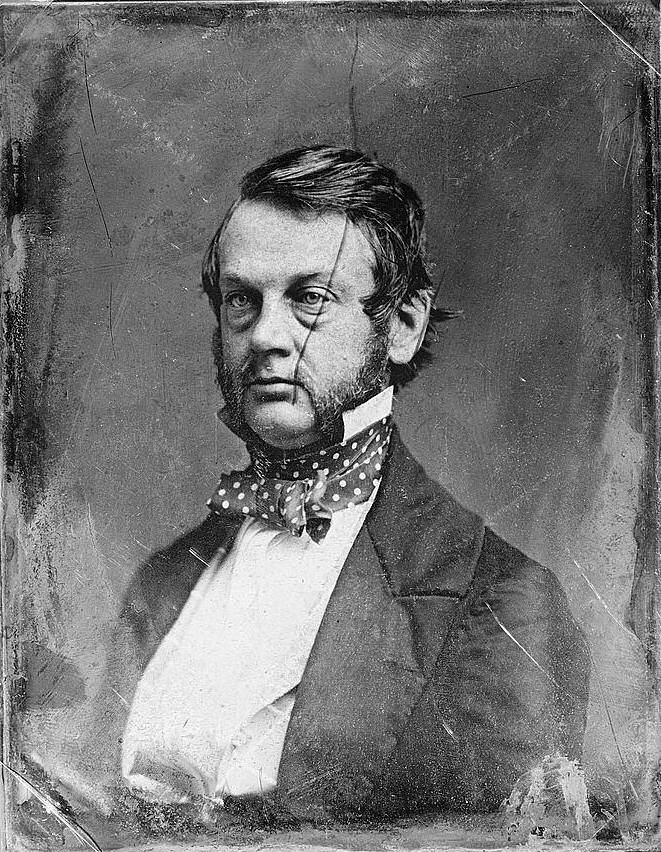

Member of the U.S. House of Representatives from New York
- In office March 4, 1851 – March 3, 1855
- Preceded by: Thomas McKissock
- Succeeded by: Ambrose S. Murray
- Constituency: 9th district (1851–1853); 10th district (1853–1855)

Personal details
- Born: October 25, 1803 Middletown, Orange County, New York, U.S.
- Died: August 25, 1875 (aged 71) Goshen, Orange County, New York, U.S.
- Resting place: Saint James Cemetery, Goshen, New York
- Party: Democratic (before 1856); Republican (from 1856)
- Spouse: Ellen Maria Matlack (m. 1837-1875, his death)
- Occupation: Banker

William Murray (October 1, 1803 – August 25, 1875) was an American banker and politician who served two terms as a United States representative from New York from 1851 to 1855.

== Biography ==
Murray was born near Middletown, New York on October 1, 1803, a son of William Murray Sr. and Mary Ann (Beakes) Murray. His siblings included Ambrose S. Murray.

=== Early career ===
William Murray attended the common schools, and was employed as a clerk in mercantile establishments, first in Middletown, and later in New York City. He subsequently engaged in a successful mercantile career in Goshen. In 1844, he was chosen as one of New York's presidential electors, and cast his ballot for the Democratic ticket of James K. Polk and George M. Dallas.

=== Congress ===
In 1850, Murray was elected to the United States House of Representatives as a Democrat, representing New York in the 32nd Congress. He was reelected to the 33rd Congress and served from March 4, 1851, to March 3, 1855.

=== Later career and death ===
After leaving Congress, Murray engaged in agricultural pursuits, and was an organizer of the Republican Party in New York. He served as president of the Goshen Bank from 1857 until his death.

Murray died in Goshen on August 25, 1875. He was interred at St. James' Episcopal Cemetery in Goshen.

== Family ==
In 1837, Murray married Ellen Maria Matlack of New York City. They were married until his death, and their children included sons Henry (1841–1874), Robert (1843–1903), and William (1844–1897) and daughter Abbey (1846–1929), the wife of William D. Van Vliet.

U.S. House of Representatives
Preceded by Thomas McKissock	Member of the U.S. House of Representatives from New York's 9th congressional district March 4, 1851 – March 3, 1853	Succeeded by Jared V. Peck
Preceded by Marius Schoonmaker	Member of the U.S. House of Representatives from New York's 10th congressional district March 4, 1853 – March 3, 1855	Succeeded by Ambrose S. Murray
