= Old Town Cemetery (Newburgh, New York) =

Historic cemetery in Orange County, New York

- Old Town Cemetery and Palatine Church Site
- U.S. National Register of Historic Places
- U.S. Historic district
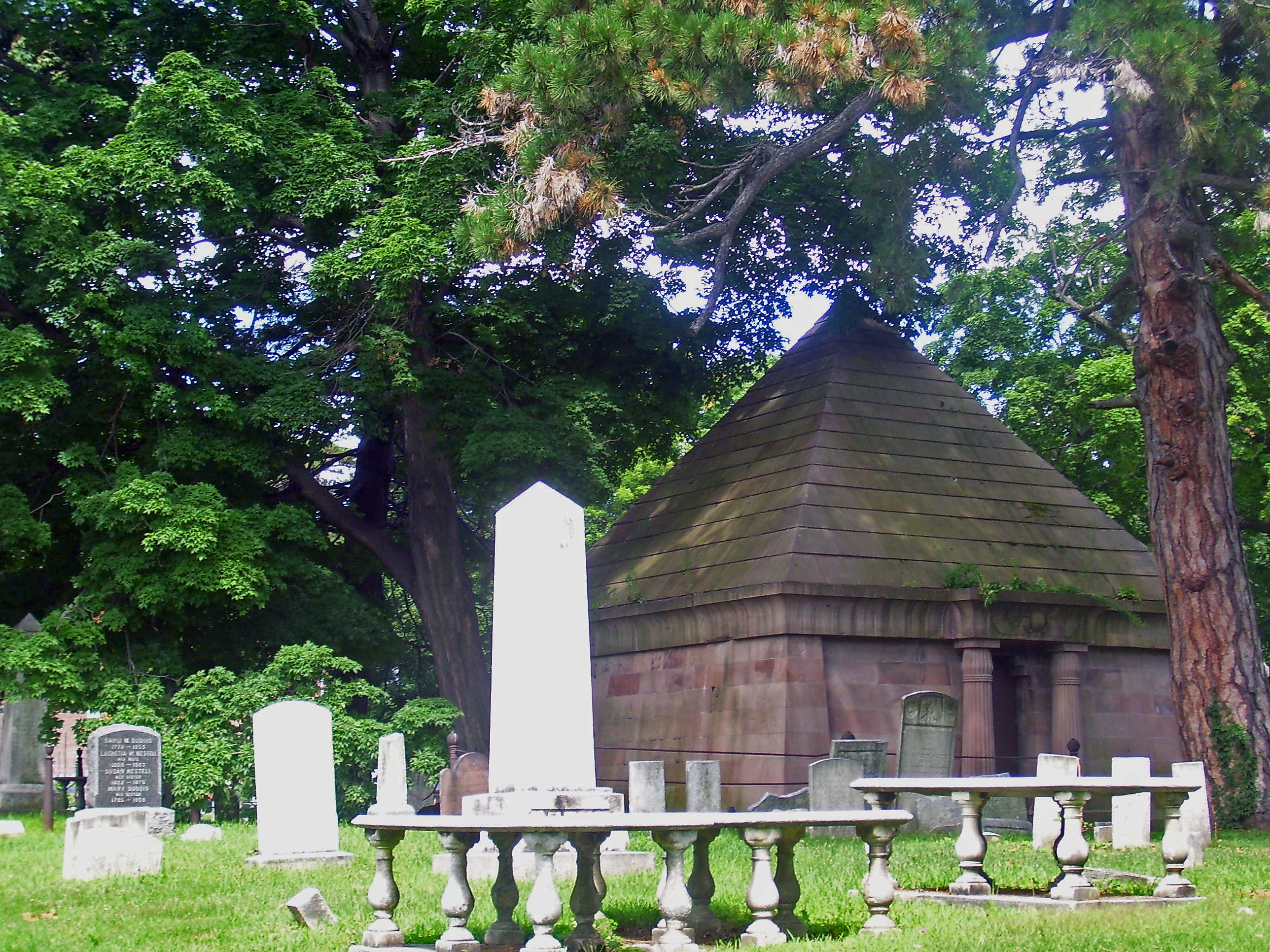
- The Robinson Mausoleum at the cemetery, possibly designed by Alexander Jackson Davis

- Location within New York Location within the United States
- Location: Grand St., Newburgh, NY
- Coordinates: 41°30′27″N 74°0′36″W
- Built: 1713
- NRHP reference No.: 00000746
- Added to NRHP: June 30, 2000

The Old Town Cemetery is located in the city of Newburgh, New York, behind Calvary Presbyterian Church on South Street. It was established in 1713 by Palatine German refugees from the Rhineland-Palatinate who were transported from England in 1710 and settled on the site of the present city of Newburgh. The cemetery is within a section of the city known as the Glebe, a 500-acre (2 km^{2}) grant made by Queen Anne to provide for a schoolmaster and clergyman for these German families. A church built by the Palatines was located on the western edge of the site, on what is now Liberty Street. As the Old Town Cemetery and Palatine Church Site, it was listed as a historic district on the National Register of Historic Places in 2000. It is also a contributing element in the larger Montgomery-Grand-Liberty Streets Historic District.

There are an estimated 1,700 burials in the cemetery, although there may at one time have been 2,500. Thirteen hundred headstones survive today; the earliest date of death still legible is 1759. Among the noteworthy persons are congressmen Jonathan Fisk and Thomas McKissock.

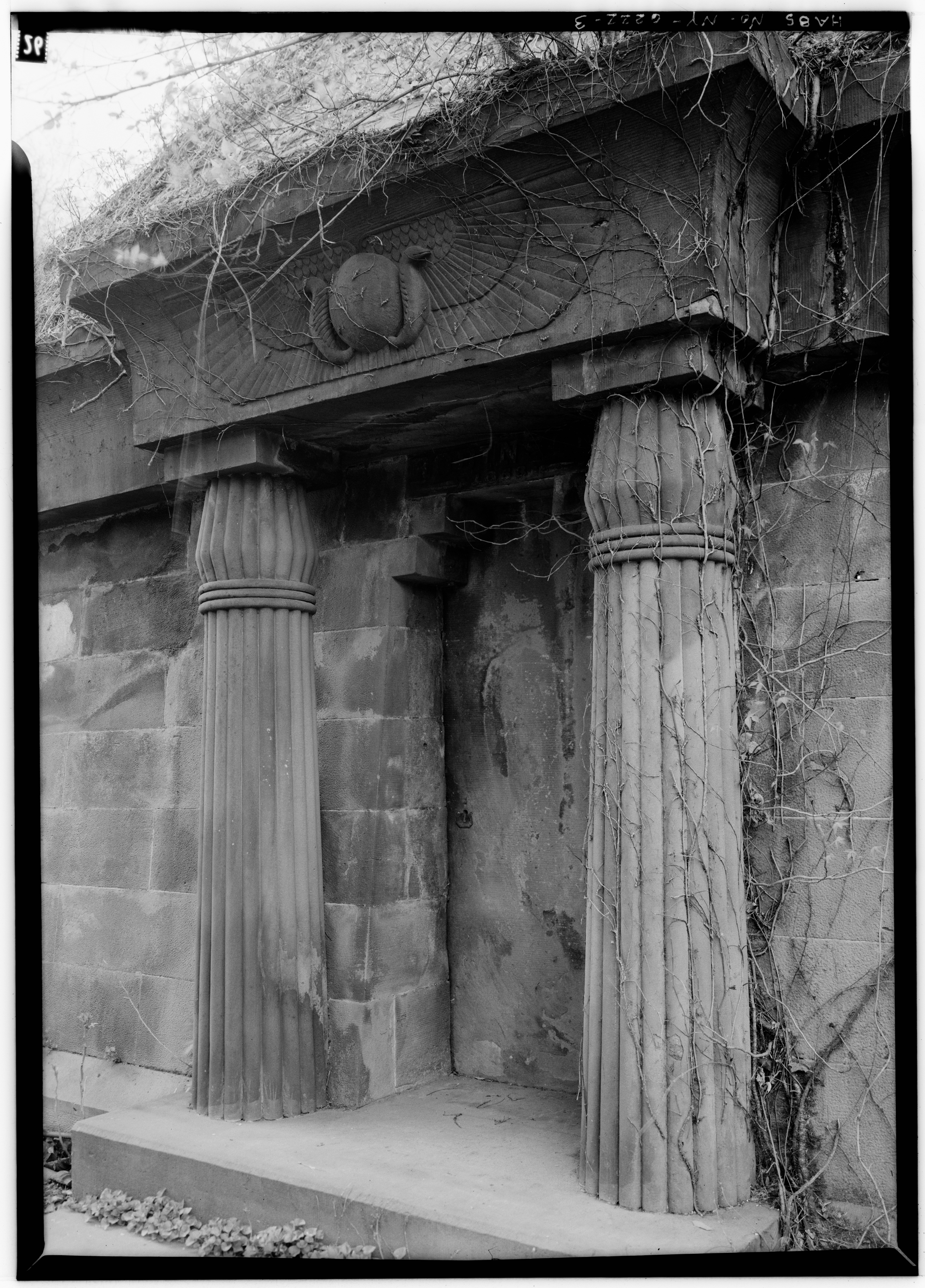
Robinson Mausoleum

The mausoleum of ship Capt. Henry Robinson, his wife Ann Buchan Robinson, and their two daughters, Sarah Robinson and Mary Robinson Benkard is architecturally distinctive. It was built in 1853, possibly by Alexander Jackson Davis, whose most notable work in Newburgh, the Dutch Reformed Church, stands a few blocks away. It is believed to be the only Egyptian Revival tomb to feature both a mastaba and a pyramid. It was overgrown and fell into disrepair until a 1999 restoration.

An interesting memorial marker here is the one for Archibald Wiseman and two of his young children by his wife, Susan Clyde, located at gravesite 1-140. Somewhat of a mystery is the inscription on the marker that reports that he died at sea on May 9, 1853. His widow Susan remarried in 1860 to a James McCord, a leather tanner and apparently unrelated to the McCord family of brush manufacturers in Newburgh, and she and McCord are last recorded in the 1880 Census at the home of her son, David Clyde Wiseman (who suffered from 'consumption') and his daughter Mary, who married in about 1869. Mary was the only daughter of James McCord by an earlier marriage. Susan and James' later fate after 1880 is unknown as of June 2011.

In 1803 New York amended the law governing the Glebe, and later an Old Town Cemetery Commission was created by the city. It consists of five members, three of them serving ex officio: the city's mayor, the local superintendent of schools and the pastor of Calvary Presbyterian Church. The other two members are appointed by the city council. Currently those are John McCormick and Gerardo Sanchez, whose company restored the Robinson Mausoleum.
