= Daniel B. St. John =

American politician

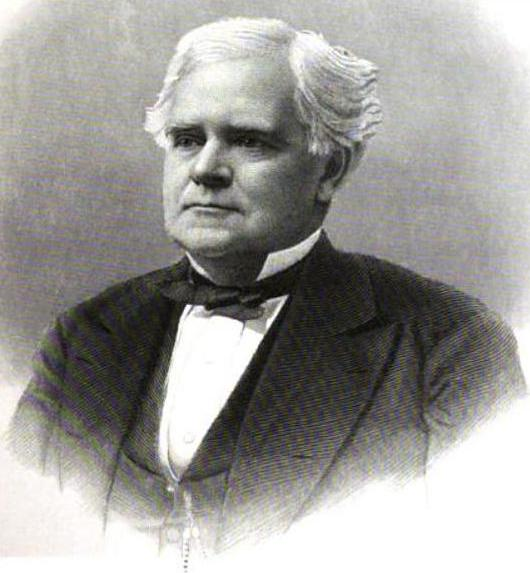

Member of the U.S. House of Representatives from New York's 9th district
- In office March 4, 1847 – March 3, 1849
- Preceded by: Archibald C. Niven
- Succeeded by: Thomas McKissock

Personal details
- Born: Daniel Bennett St. John; October 8, 1808 Sharon, Connecticut, U.S.
- Died: February 18, 1890 (aged 81) New York City, U.S.
- Resting place: Cedar Hill Cemetery, Newburgh, New York, U.S.
- Party: Whig

Daniel Bennett St. John (October 8, 1808 – February 18, 1890) was an American businessman and politician who served one term as a U.S. representative from New York from 1847 to 1849.

== Life ==
Born in Sharon, Connecticut, St. John engaged in mercantile pursuits and the real estate business at Monticello, New York, in 1831.

== Business career ==
In 1851, while operating as a prominent merchant in Monticello, New York, St. John partnered with journalists Henry Jarvis Raymond and George Jones, alongside financier Edward B. Wesley, to launch a new metropolitan newspaper,The New York Times.

He became one of the original seven outside investors in the joint-stock partnership, Raymond, Jones & Co., pooling capital to fund the paper's initial $100,000 launch. The publication printed its inaugural issue on September 18, 1851, as The New-York Daily Times. St. John remained a "silent" financial backer, leaving the editorial operations to Raymond and publishing management to Jones.

=== Political career ===
He was a member of the New York State Assembly (Sullivan County) in 1840.

==== Congress ====
St. John was elected as a Whig to the 30th United States Congress, holding office from March 4, 1847, to March 3, 1849.

=== After Congress ===
He moved to Newburgh, New York.

He served as delegate to the Constitutional Union National Convention in 1860.

He was a member of the New York State Senate (10th D.) from 1876 to 1879, sitting in the 99th, 100th, 101st and 102nd New York State Legislatures, and a delegate to the 1876 Democratic National Convention. St. John served as chief registrar in the banking department of New York State.

=== Death and burial ===
He died in New York City February 18, 1890. He was interred in Cedar Hill Cemetery, Newburgh, New York.

== Sources ==
- United States Congress. "Daniel B. St. John (id: S000766)". Biographical Directory of the United States Congress.

U.S. House of Representatives
Preceded by Archibald C. Niven	Member of the U.S. House of Representatives from New York's 9th congressional district 1847-1849	Succeeded by Thomas McKissock
New York State Senate
Preceded by Edward M. Madden	New York State Senate; 10th District; 1876–1879	Succeeded by William W. Astor
