= Walsh-Havemeyer House =

Historic house in New York, United States

- U.S. National Register of Historic Places
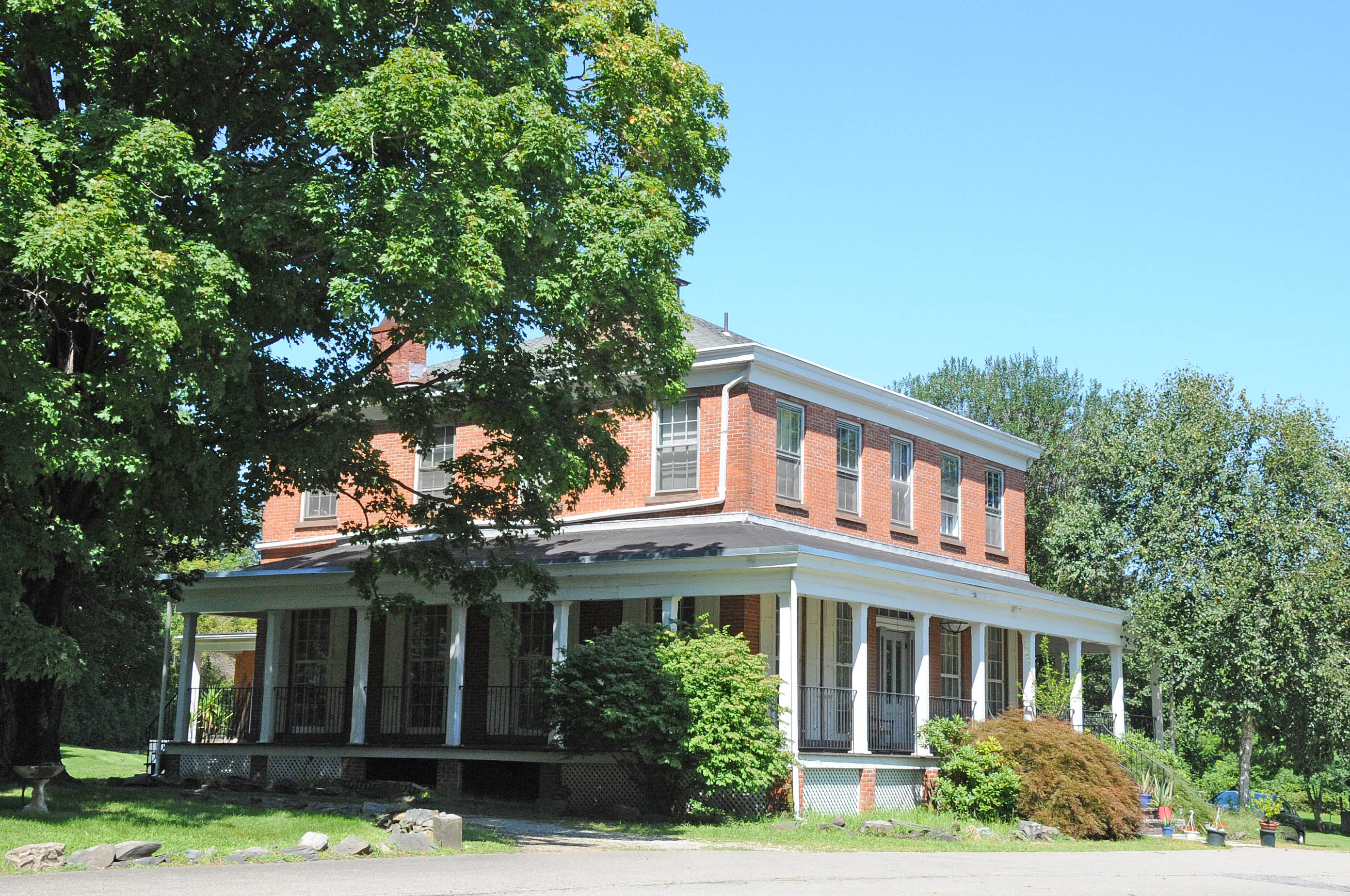

- Location within New York Location within the United States
- Location: 10 Plympton St., New Windsor, New York
- Coordinates: 41°29′20.3″N 74°1′4.95″W
- Area: 2.06 acres (0.83 ha)
- Built: 1835
- Architectural style: Greek Revival
- NRHP reference No.: 10000101
- Added to NRHP: March 23, 2010

Walsh-Havemeyer House, also known as the Plympton House, is a historic home located at New Windsor in Orange County, New York. It was built about 1835 and subsequently expanded and modified.

The house consists of a two-story brick main block with two-story brick wing. The interior retains a number of notable Greek Revival treatments dating to the period of original construction. Also on the property is a frame privy and cast-iron fence.

It was listed on the National Register of Historic Places in 2010.

== History ==
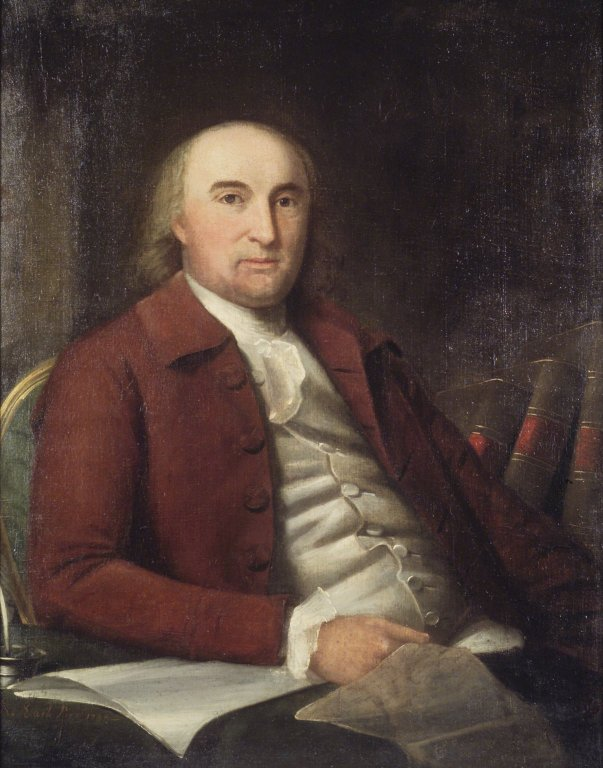
A 1788 portrait by Ralph Earl, believed to be of Robert Boyd, Jr., gifted by the van Kleeck Family, his descendants

The house sits on the former farm of patriot Robert Boyd, Jr. (1734 — 1804). In June 1775, Boyd built a water-powered forge on the south side of the nearby Vale of Avoca. He was a Scottish immigrant to New Windsor before the Revolutionary War, and with his father, Robert Boyd, Sr. (1703 — 1786), continued their trade as blacksmiths. After 1761, they obtained a hundred-acre farm on the northern end of William Chamber's patent. Boyd's gun smithery manufactured bayonets, gun barrels muskets, as he had received a contract from the revolutionary authorities to produce them. He was paid three pounds and fifteen shillings. By February 1776, their gun smithery was remarked as one of the best in the colonies. However, he had difficulty with assistance at the forge, and sent agents abroad to secure more workmen, a mission that proved to be unsuccessful. He was a member of the New Windsor Committee of Safety, along with Samuel Brewster, a blacksmith on Moodna Creek. After the Revolution, he converted the works into a plaster mill and retired.

In 1790, George Clinton sold his grist and saw mill in the Vale to Hugh Walsh, who extended his property to Boyd's. The Havemeyer family were German entrepreneurs who owned property in New Windsor that they maintained in the summer months.
