= St. George's Cemetery (Newburgh, New York) =

- Interactive map of St. George's Cemetery

Details
- Established: 1838
- Location: Newburgh, New York
- Country: United States
- Coordinates: 41°29′50″N 74°00′52″W
- Owned by: St. George's Episcopal Church
- Size: 7 acres

St. George's Cemetery is a historic cemetery in Newburgh, New York. The cemetery is located in the city's East End Historic District and serves the Episcopal parish of St. George's on Grand Street.

== History ==
By the 19th century, Old Town Cemetery, the city's oldest burying ground, exceeded its occupancies. As the city continued to grow, room for expansion proved to be unattainable. In 1838, the Rev. John Brown of St. George's Episcopal Church purchased land on the southeastern part of the city, consisting partly of farmland.

Rev. Brown favored the natural descent of the land, and from its sloping fields, the Highlands could be appreciated. He is thought to have collaborated with Andrew Jackson Downing on the cemetery, especially with designs of pedestrian and carriage pathways. Brown strategically placed trees to provide shade and make pathways navigable. The ultimate vision for the cemetery emulated a paradise on earth, separated from urban life.

City historian A. Elwood Corning speculated that the Hasbroucks used the front of their property as a personal burying ground. When work began to extend Colden Street, graves were reinterred at St. George's, a short walking distance away. It is thought that the remains of Colonel Jonathan Hasbrouck (1722–1780) and possibly his wife, Tryntje, were placed beneath a sycamore tree on the south side of the cemetery. Workers found much older remains, and due to their age placed them in Old Town Cemetery.

On the day before Decoration Day festivities in 1899, the remains of Robert Blair, an Irish immigrant and personal bodyguard of George Washington, were found. Blair had been buried in 1841, near the supposed reburial site of Colonel Hasbrouck. Although a skeleton thought to be Hasbrouck's received attention, findings were never conclusive.

Over the years, maintenance of the city's cemeteries began to decrease. As the city began to struggle in the late 1960s, St. George's became a dumping ground for the surrounding neighborhood. Frequent vandalism occurred, and as many as 1,200 headstones were toppled in 1975. Some became targets for graffiti, and at night, the cemetery unwillingly hosted criminal activity.

In an effort to restore the cemetery's beauty, St. George's Church actively fundraises for its preservation. The Historical Society of Newburgh Bay & The Highlands also holds walking tours explaining the historic significance of graves.

=== Notable Graves ===
- Henry Haywood Bell (1808–1868), U. S. Navy Rear Admiral.
- Samuel Watkins Eager (1789–1860), U. S. Representative for New York.
- William Fullerton (1817–1900), attorney in several sensational trials that made him a minor celebrity.
- William Cornelius Hasbrouck (1800–1870), New York State Assemblyman and prominent attorney.
- Dennis William Hickey (1844–1908), Civil War veteran and Medal of Honor recipient.
- George Washington Rains (1817-1898), New Bern, North Carolina-born, West Point graduate, Confederate officer, creator of the Augusta Powder Works.
- William James Roe II (1843–1921), writer of several satirical and science fiction novels, philosopher and artist.
- William Tuthill (1855–1929), architect of Carnegie Hall.
- Lee Woodward Zeigler (1868–1952), Baltimore-born illustrator and muralist.
