= Dennis Hickey =

Denis or Dennis Hickey (or Hickie) may refer to:

- Dennis Hickey (American football) (born 1970), general manager of the Miami Dolphins
- Dennis W. Hickey (1844–1908), Union Army soldier in the American Civil War and Medal of Honor recipient
- Dennis Walter Hickey (1914–1999), American Catholic bishop
- Denny Hickey (1890–1965), American racing driver
- Denis Hickey (born 1964), Australian cricketer
- Denis Hickie (born 1976), Irish rugby player
- Denis J. Hickie (1943–2021), Irish rugby union player

== See also ==
- Hickey (surname)
