= The Church of the Corner Stone =

Church building in Newburgh, New York

Coordinates: 41°30′24″N 74°00′35″W

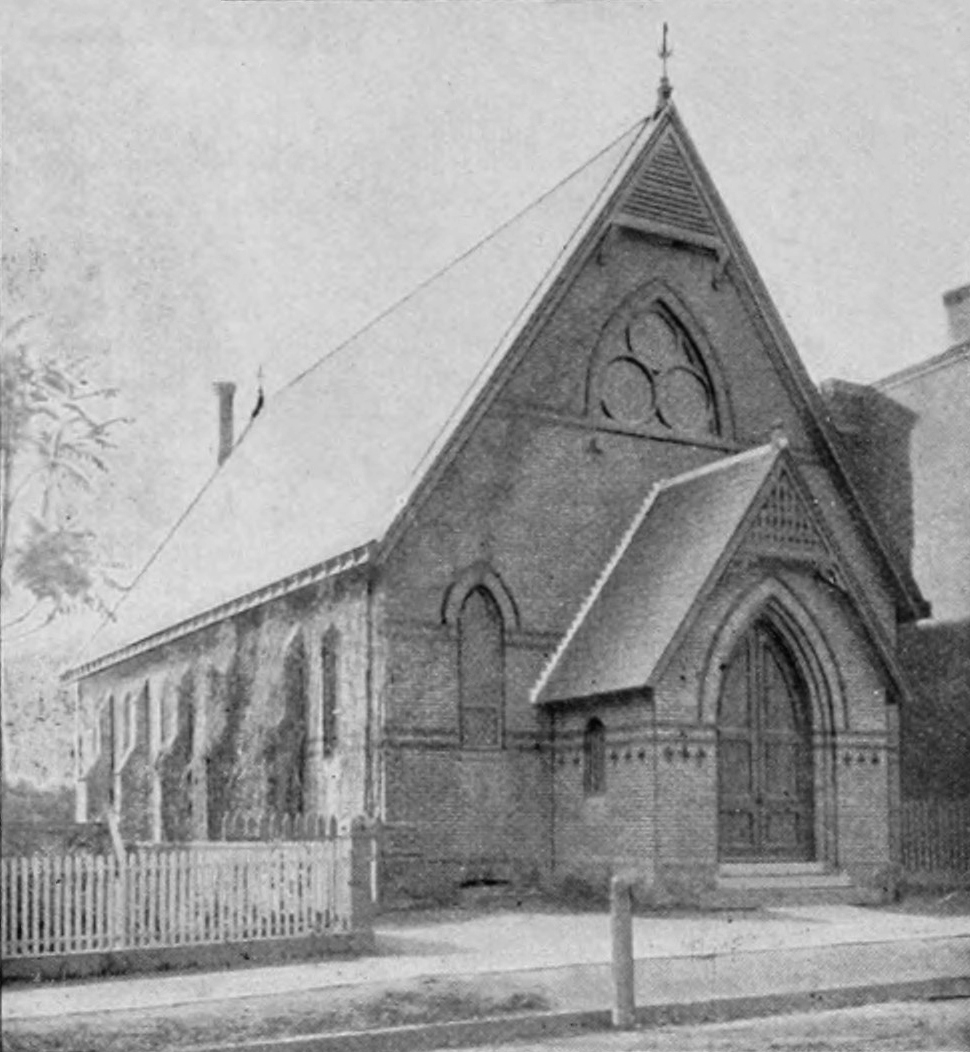
- The church c. 1890
- The Church of the Corner Stone
- Location: 111 South Street, Newburgh, New York
- Country: United States
- Denomination: Reformed Episcopal

History
- Dedication: April 16, 1876
- Earlier dedication: December 22, 1875

Architecture
- Functional status: Active as The Best Temple Church of God in Christ, Pentecostal
- Architect: George E. Harney
- Style: High Victorian Gothic

Specifications
- Materials: Brick

Administration
- Archdiocese: New York and Philadelphia Synod

The Church of the Corner Stone was a Reformed Episcopal congregation in Newburgh, New York, formed nearly 2 years after a split from the Protestant Episcopal Church in 1873. For a brief period, it was the church of the Rev. James Martin Gray. The 1870s church building now serves as the Best Temple Church of God in Christ.

== Founding ==
Around the time of the church's founding, Newburgh was a chiefly Protestant city, and had been that way for its nearly 200-year history. With the force of the Oxford Movement, the Reformed Episcopal Church formed by Bishop George David Cummins on December 2, 1873, in opposition. Nearly a year later, a group of Episcopalian men gathered on December 8, 1874, in the parlor of the Newburgh Club. The Catholic presence in the city at this time was also increasing, perhaps giving an urgency to Cummins' new teachings. These men were Daniel T. Rogers, Walter C. Anthony and Thomas Hazard Roe of Newburgh and William James Roe II and Benjamin Franklin Clark, of New Windsor, Roe's uncle. After several more meetings, they considered the formation of a Reformed Episcopal church in Newburgh and began collecting pledges and amassing support. The men wrote to Bishop Cummins and urged him to travel to Newburgh.

Cummins came to Newburgh on August 8, 1875, to preach to an interested crowd at the American Reformed Church, which the founding members had loaned for the morning. The bishop presented his revised edition of the Book of Common Prayer and explained the new tenants of his church. The next night, a larger crowd gathered in the church's basement to make pledges and hear Cummins speak.

== Formation of the Church ==
The founders were able to obtain the chapel of the Associate Reformed Church, and the first service was held there by the Rev. Benjamin B. Leacock on August 15, 1875. He conducted a morning and evening service. The next Sunday, August 22, the Rev. William P. Sabine directed services and preached to a larger congregation. On August 25, the congregation was asked to meet at the basement of the American Reformed Church. There, the church was essentially founded officially, and the church council was elected. Their membership application was sent to the Standing Committee of the Reformed Episcopal Church that night, organized under the general statute of the State of New York. William James Roe II suggested "The Church of the Corner Stone" as the corporate name. In preparation for a new pastor, the next Sunday, September 5, the Rev. Mason Gallagher read the service, and together with Dr. J. G. Birch, they organized the first sabbath school.

=== The First Church Council ===
- Wardens: Daniel T. Rogers, Walter C. Anthony
- Vestryman: William J. Roe II, James G. Graham, J. Wilson Stratton, George Middleton, Robert L. Chase, James G. Birch and Edward Haigh
- Secretary and Treasurer: Benjamin F. Clark

The Rev. Benjamin B. Leacock was called as the first official pastor, and he accepted on November 2, 1875. On October 23, 1875, the council had purchased a lot of land on South Street for the church.

The contract for the new church building was given to mason Thomas Dobbin at $4,969 on November 24. Donations enabled willing hands to excavate a cellar and lay a foundation. The cornerstone was laid on December 22, but no ceremony was held. The church was completed by the spring of 1876. It was built in the High Victorian Gothic style and designed by Newburgh architect George E. Harney. At the very first Easter Sunday service, the Rev. Leacock was assisted by the Rev. Marshall B. Smith.

On April 22, 1878, the Rev. Leacock resigned, and on October 1, the Rev. James Martin Gray accepted the pastorate, but resigned on November 18, 1879. Leacock filled in as minister in charge until April 3, 1880. The Rev. J. W. Fairley was his assistant, and Leacock eventually fell ill and was given a leave of absence for two years, and he resigned for good on December 2, 1883. Fairley went on, and the Rev. James Otis Denniston and the Rev. Richard Bosworth served after him. The Rev. Arthur Potts followed them. The Sabbath school flourished under the direction of an original warden. On many occasions, the church held picnics and outings outside of Newburgh. Church membership and attendance was also increasing, until the demand for the church plateaued.

== Rev. James Louis Best ==
Many of Newburgh's Protestant churches were declining by the 1910s, as Catholic immigrants were heavily populating the city. St. George's Episcopal Church became the chief Episcopal church in Newburgh, as the others began to close in the following decades.

By 1917, the church and its congregation were "ready to sink for the last time," but it was saved by Bishop Robert Livingston Rudolph.

In 1941, the Rev. James Louis Best began preaching in Newburgh. He eventually moved his family there in 1944. Originally from North Carolina, Best moved to New York and became an influential Pentecostal minister. His first services in Newburgh were held in a storefront at 138 Water Street. The congregation there began to grow, and by April 1954 had moved to 80 Montgomery Street. The Best Temple Church of God in Christ was established here, but the congregation fled after Urban Renewal pushed them out in 1962. They found 111 South Street, the empty Church of the Corner-Stone, and renamed the building. Best assisted his community through Newburgh's post-Urban Renewal decline and descent into poverty, serving until his death in 2001.
