= William James Roe =

American author and illustrator (1843–1921)

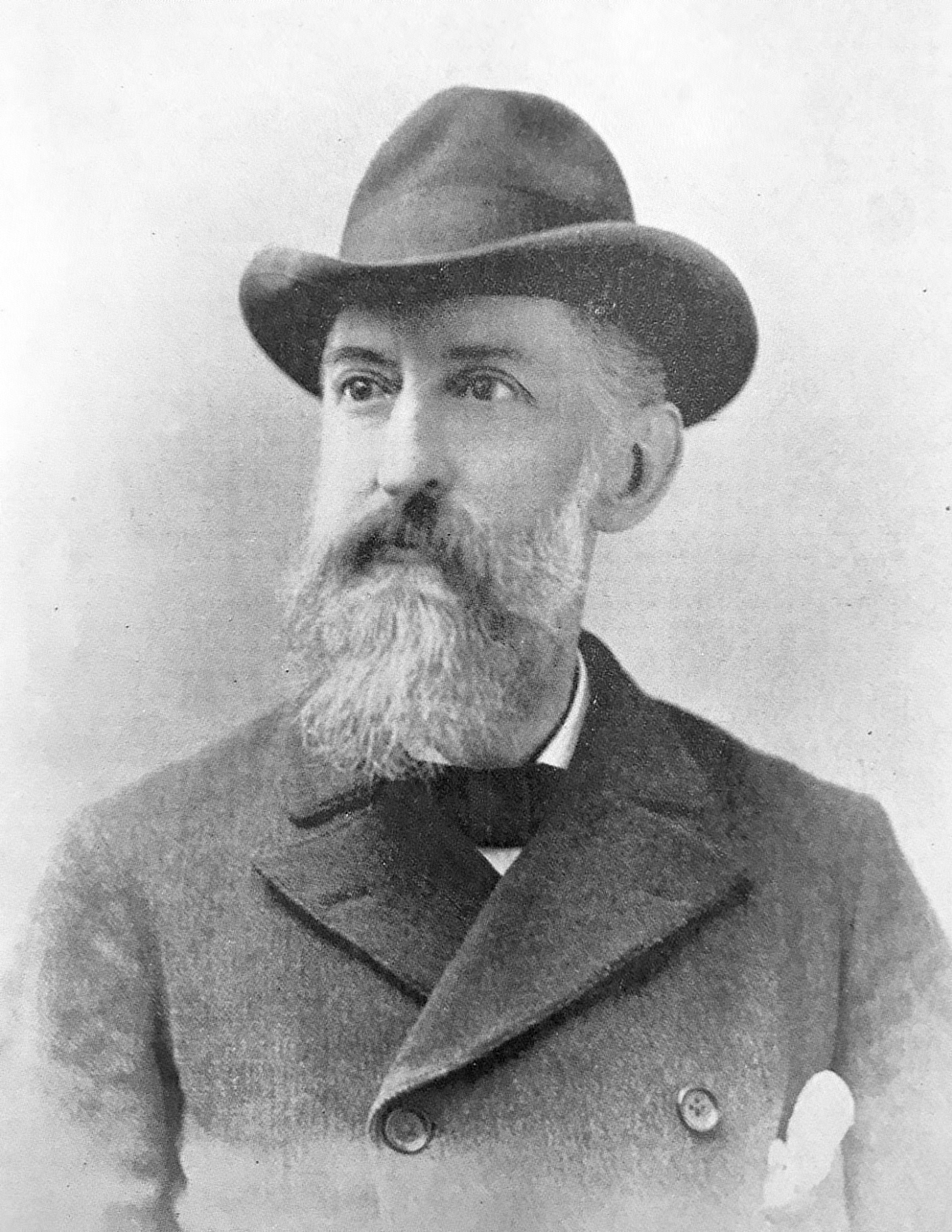
- Born: September 1, 1843; Newburgh, New York, U.S.
- Died: April 3, 1921 (aged 77); New Windsor, New York, U.S.
- Resting place: St. George's Cemetery (Newburgh, New York)
- Education: Russell Military Academy; United States Military Academy
- Occupations: Writer, illustrator
- Spouse: Mary Stuart Norton (m. 1867)
- Children: 3
- Relatives: Edward Payson Roe (first cousin); William C. Hasbrouck (uncle); Lee Woodward Zeigler (son-in-law)
- Writing career
- Pen name: Hudor Genone, G. I. Cervus, Viroe
- Language: English
- Years active: 1859–1920
- Genres: Satire, fiction, science fiction, fantasy
- Notable works: Cut: A Story of West Point (1885), Inquirendo Island (1886), Bellona's Husband: A Romance (1886), An Inn for Journeying Thoughts (1912)

William James Roe II (September 1, 1843 – April 3, 1921) was an American author, artist, and businessman.

== Early life ==
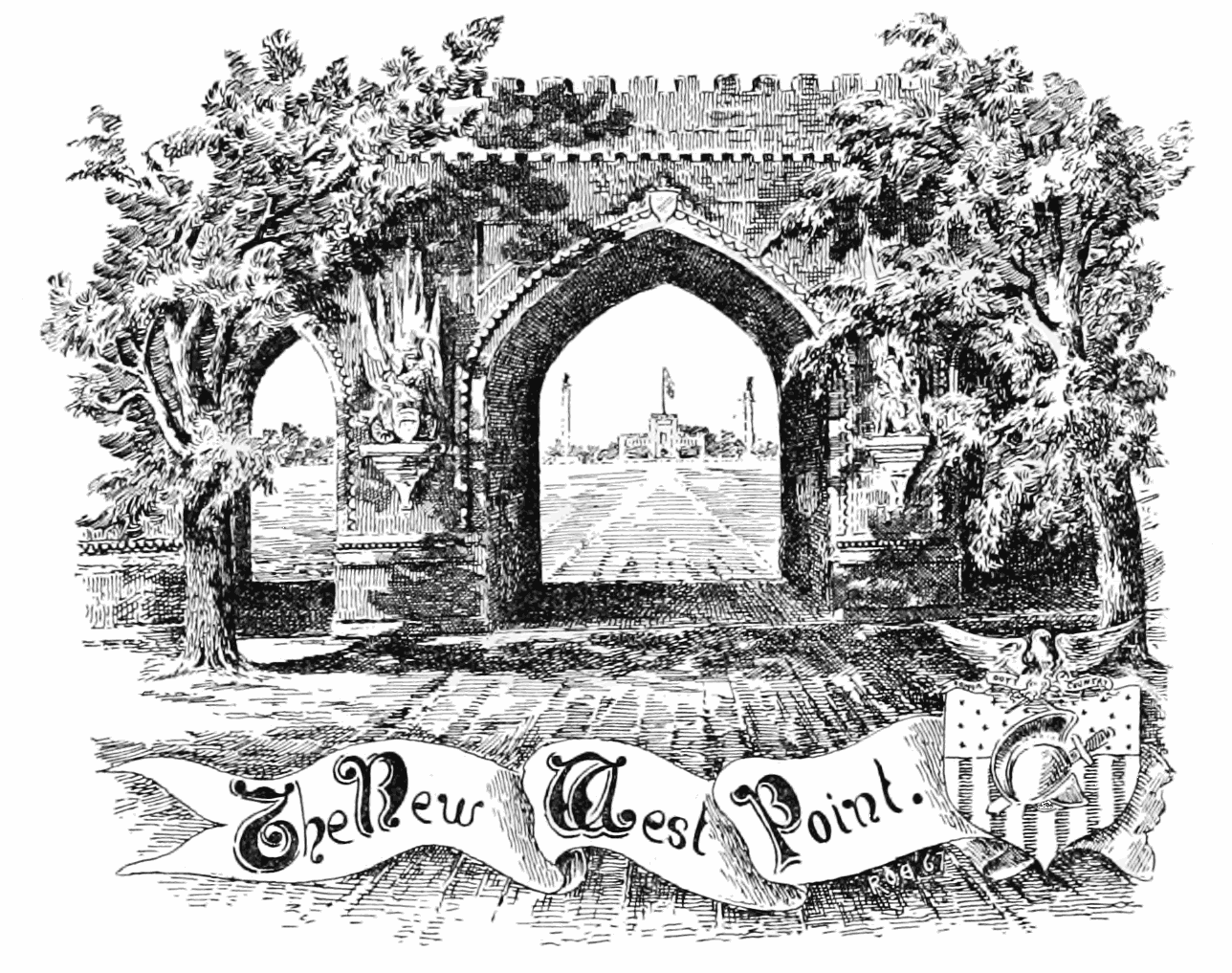
Roe's illustration for his 1903 Popular Science Monthly article, "The New West Point".

Roe was born to William James Roe I (1811–1875) and Anna Lawrence Clark Roe (1814–1914) on September 1, 1843, in Newburgh, New York. At the time, his parents were residing in the mansion of his grandparents, William Roe and Maria Hazard Roe, on Grand Street. William Roe, born in Kingston, was a retired New York grocer who arrived in Newburgh in the 1820s. His son, William James Roe I, improved the family fortune working for Luman Reed and Jonathan Sturges, becoming an art collector himself.

Roe was educated at Russell Military Academy in New Haven, Connecticut, a preparatory school for young men interested in attending nearby Yale or West Point. After abruptly leaving Russell's, Roe was enrolled at the Newburgh Collegiate Institute, a private boys' school in Newburgh administered by Polish-American M. L. Domanski. During this time, he began writing for the school's magazine, The Acorn. At fifteen, Roe left his schooling to study law at the firm Hasbrouck & Taylor in Newburgh. His uncle, William C. Hasbrouck, supervised his studies. Later in life, he remarked that the law profession was not for him.

In 1861, he enlisted in a volunteer company, the 124th New York Volunteer Infantry Regiment, in response to the outbreak of the Civil War. Though he was elected sergeant, his father was opposed to him engaging in the war and took him to Europe in January 1862.

Roe Sr. claimed he would allow his son to continue if the war had not ended within six months. Most of those six months were spent abroad, and the Roes visited England, France, Germany, Switzerland, and Italy. Roe corresponded with the Newburgh Journal, and letters from his travels abroad were serialized. While traveling, cadetship at West Point was offered. Going through West Point to become a lieutenant was more favorable for than fighting. He received an appointment from the Hon. John Sedgwick and began in 1863, graduating in 1867.

== Business career ==
When Roe I was declared a lunatic, his son took the reins on his business ventures and maintained his property. Roe II was appointed overseer of his father's will and finances. With his acquired wealth, Roe built two country houses—one for himself, the other for his parents—on 80 acres of land in New Windsor. William James Roe I died on November 20, 1875. Much of his earnings were lost due to financial inexperience.

Seeking to regain the losses, Roe became president of the Hydrogen Company of New York and New Jersey in 1881. He had moved his family to Montclair, New Jersey in 1880. The company sought to perfect a process that made iron parts insusceptible to rust. A building was erected at West 18th Street in Manhattan and more commercial outlets were realized. None of these came to fruition, as the process was never improved to the satisfaction of a market. The company collapsed immediately after this failure.

== Writing career ==
Roe had always found a hobby in writing creatively and for the press. After he regained part of his fortune, he turned to writing entertaining short stories, philosophical works and poetry.

His earliest novels were The Model Wife, White Feathers and Cut: A Story of West Point. At the time of its publication, Cut was regarded as the most accurate depictions of cadet life at West Point, being based heavily on Roe’s own experiences. He soon after began planning new novels under the pen names Hudor Genone and G. I. Cervus.

One of his most popular novels was Inquierendo Island, published in 1886 by G. P. Putnam’s Sons, the Twentieth Century Company and Charles H. Kerr Publishing Company. It aroused much debate over its religious satire elements in the United States and abroad. In Inquierendo Island, he “dramatized in unmistakable terms his negative feelings about Christianity. The protagonist, shipwrecked on the eponymous mid-Atlantic Island, discovers that its inhabitants have constructed a topsy-turvy Religion, which they follow with pious zeal, out of their ancestors' bad memories of their own shipwreck and out of idolatry directed towards the arithmetic text which is the only printed book to have survived; they worship at the church of Saint Complex Fraction. The book can also be seen to mock the triumphalist arguments that bolster the typical Robinsonade.”

About a year later, Bellona's Husband: A Romance was published by J. B. Lippincott & Co. The novel “takes its protagonists via Spaceship – powered by a kind of Antigravity device – to Mars, where they find a humanlike society distinguished from ours partly by the Martians' insistence that the literal truth must always be told, but mainly by the fact that they live backwards in time, growing constantly younger; this may be the earliest example of the Time in Reverse tale presented in full-fledged narrative form.”

In 1892, The Last Tenet Imposed upon the Khan of Thomathoz was published by Charles H. Kerr & Company. Roe's affinity for religious satire continued. The novel describes “the discovery by sixteenth-century missionaries of the Lost World of Thomathoz hidden in the mountains of Asia.”

More compact works such as such as John Morton’s Morals and Scarlet Gods were novels both published serially in Town & Country, while the esoteric and slightly occult “The Philosophy of a Divine Man” was published in The Metaphysical Magazine. For a brief period, Roe had an interest in the occult, becoming interested in hypnotism and divination. He later found these to be dangerous, denouncing Eusapia Palladino in The New York Times.

== Personal life ==
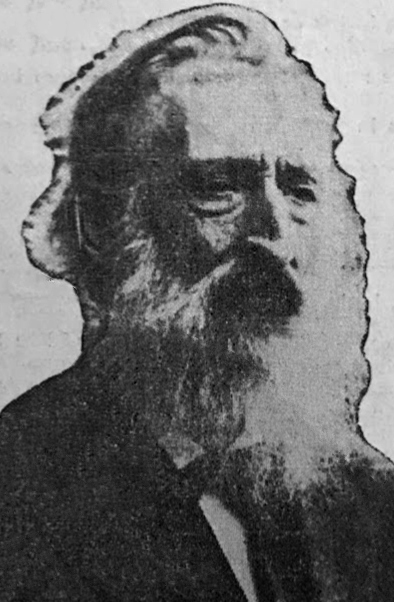
Photograph from a September 1914 interview, announcing his gradual retirement from writing

On July 1, 1867, Roe married Mary Stuart Norton at Central Presbyterian Church in Buffalo, New York. They had three children.

Roe was raised Episcopalian at St. George's Church, Newburgh, despite many of his ancestors being Presbyterian. He was integral to the founding of the first Reformed Episcopal church in Newburgh, which he had selected the name for: The Church of the Corner-Stone.

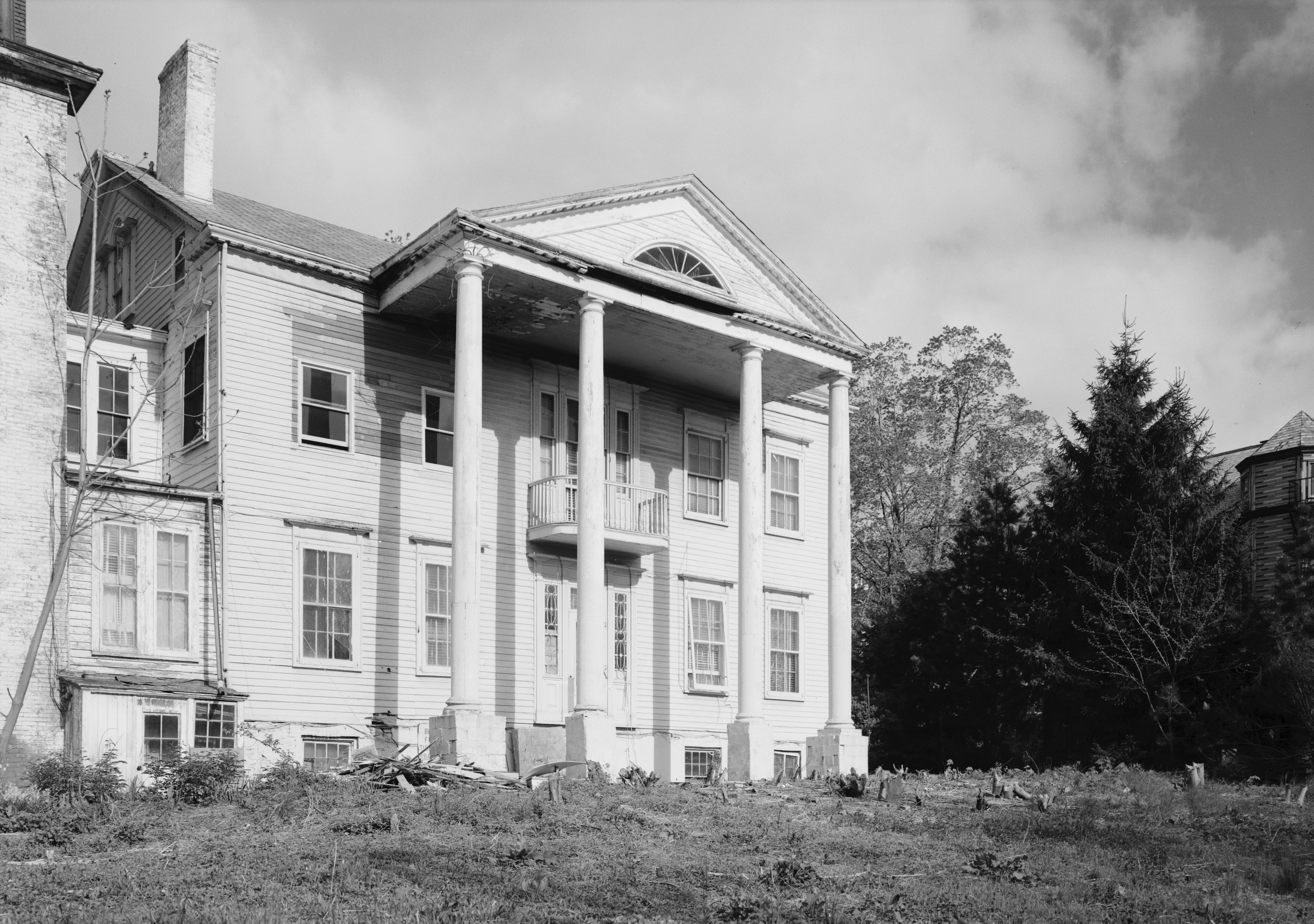
The William Roe Mansion in Newburgh, where three generations of the family lived.

Mary Stuart went on to marry the artist Lee Woodward Zeigler on October 16, 1909, at St. Thomas Episcopal Church. Both daughters were talented writers, and often wrote using pen names in St. Nicholas Magazine.

On November 27, 1920, the family was traveling to the 1920 Army-Navy Football Game at the Polo Grounds in New York City when Anna was killed in an automobile accident.

Roe never recovered from her sudden death. That winter, he began to lose interest in life and his writing. He died on April 3 at 77. He requested that his funeral not exceed $250 in costs. It was held on the afternoon of April 5, after which he was buried in St. George's Cemetery.
