= Perkins-Rockwell House =

Historic house in Connecticut, United States

- U.S. National Register of Historic Places
- U.S. Historic district – Contributing property
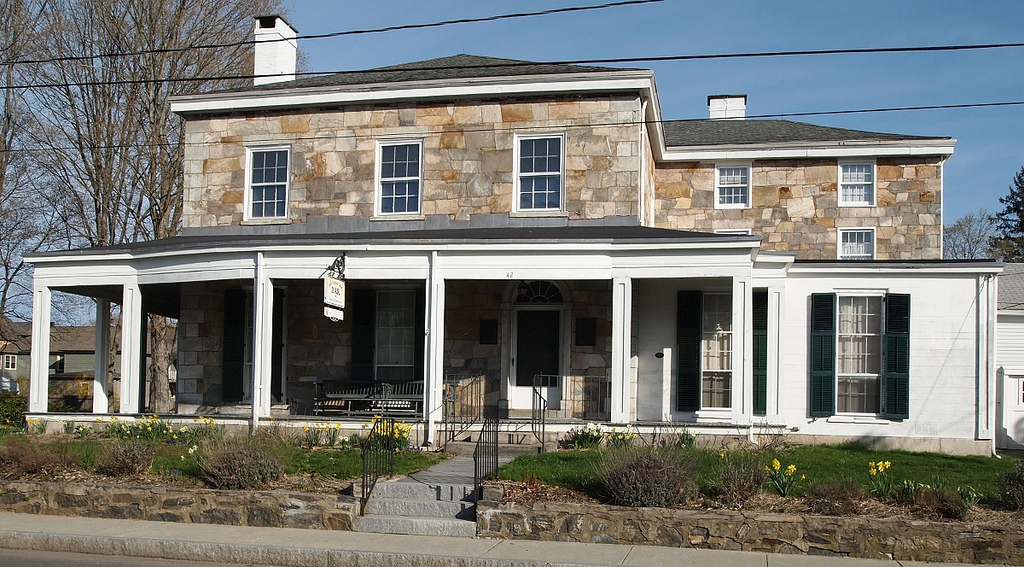

- Location within Connecticut Location within the United States
- Location: 42 Rockwell Street, Norwich, Connecticut
- Coordinates: 41°32′5″N 72°4′45″W
- Area: 1 acre (0.40 ha)
- Built: 1818
- Built by: Perkins, Joseph
- Architectural style: Federal
- Part of: Chelsea Parade Historic District (ID88003215)
- NRHP reference No.: 85003144

Significant dates
- Added to NRHP: October 17, 1985
- Designated CP: May 12, 1989

The Perkins-Rockwell House is a historic house museum at 42 Rockwell Street in Norwich, Connecticut. Built in 1818, it is locally distinctive as a well-preserved stone house of the Federal period, and for its association with the locally prominent Perkins and Rockwell families; this house was home to John A. Rockwell, a prominent local lawyer who married into the Perkins family, and also served as a member of Congress. The house was listed on the National Register of Historic Places on October 17, 1985. The house is currently owned by the Faith Trumbull Chapter of the Daughters of the American Revolution (DAR), along with the adjacent Nathaniel Backus House.

== Description and history ==
The Perkins-Rockwell House is located near Norwich's Chelsea Parade, on the north side of Rockwell Street between Crescent Street and McKinley Avenue. It is a large Federal style house, built of random-cut ashlar granite, with a hip roof. A single-story porch extends across the building's front and wraps around the left side. There is a single-story wood-frame addition east of the front facade, set before a recessed original kitchen section. The interior is finished with high quality woodwork, which is mostly Federal in style. Passages between the public rooms downstairs are typically finished as keystoned arches.

The house was built between 1814 and 1818 by Joseph Perkins, a descendant of one of the area's early settlers. His daughter, Mary Perkins Rockwell, and her husband John A. Rockwell inherited the property, making a number of alterations to it. The Rockwell family retained ownership, successive generations occupying it until 1934, when they gave it to the local DAR chapter.

== See also ==
- National Register of Historic Places listings in New London County, Connecticut
