= Uncasville School =

- U.S. National Register of Historic Places
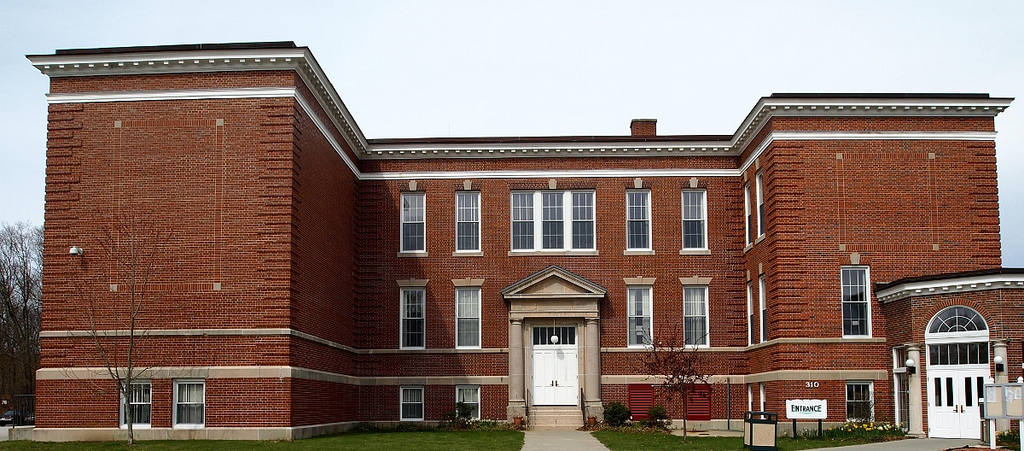

- Location within Connecticut Location within the United States
- Location: 310 Norwich-New London Turnpike, Montville, Connecticut
- Coordinates: 41°26′4″N 72°6′42″W
- Area: 1.8 acres (0.73 ha)
- Built by: Douglas, H.R.
- Architect: Potter, Wilson
- Architectural style: Renaissance Revival
- NRHP reference No.: 00001327
- Added to NRHP: February 23, 2001

The Uncasville School is a historic school building at 310 Norwich-New London Turnpike in the Uncasville section of Montville, Connecticut. Designed by architect Wilson Potter, it was built during 1917-1918 by local contractor H. R. Douglas. In 1925 it was expanded by a major addition. A fine local example of Renaissance Revival architecture, its construction was funded by Grace Palmer Melcer, the daughter of a local industrialist. The building was added to the National Register of Historic Places in 2001. The building now houses town offices.

== Description and history ==
The former Uncasville School building is located in the village of Uncasville, on the west side of Norwich-New London Turnpike (Connecticut Route 32) south of Maple Avenue. It is a two-story brick building, its original core at the center of a U, whose flanking wings are additions. The historic main entrance is in the center of the U, framed by cast stone Doric columns supporting an entablature and pedimented gable. Windows are set in keystoned openings, and the building corners exhibit brick quoining. Stone stringcourses run above the basement and below the first-floor windows, and the building cornice is studded with modillion blocks.

The school was built in 1917-18 to a design by architect Wilson Potter, a regionally well-known specialist in school buildings. Potter is also believed to have executed the designs for the wings, which are stylistically virtually indistinguishable from the original main block. Grace Palmer Melcer, whose family owned local mills, funded its construction and retained ownership of the building until 1925, when it was enlarged to address overcrowding. The school was a focal center of the community, hosting meetings and events of community groups, including evening adult education classes for immigrants.

== See also ==
- National Register of Historic Places listings in New London County, Connecticut
