= Ellington Center Historic District =

Historic district in Connecticut, United States

- U.S. National Register of Historic Places
- U.S. Historic district
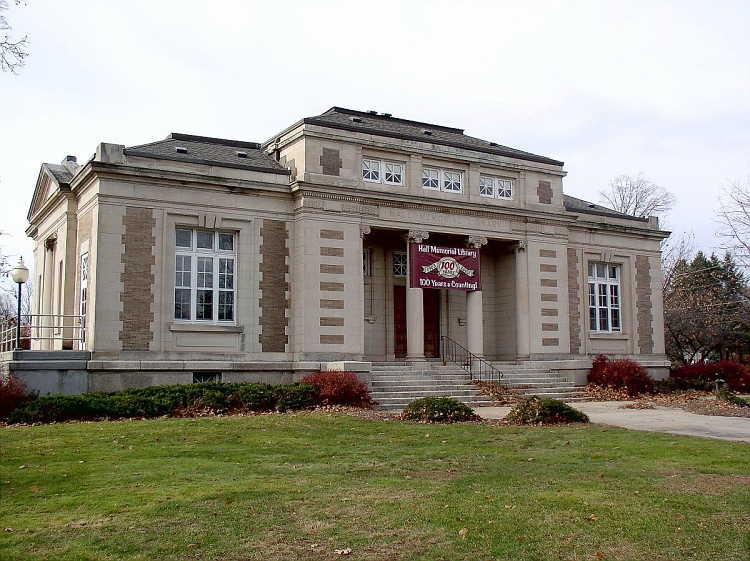
- Hall Memorial Library

- Location within Connecticut Location within the United States
- Location: Roughly, Maple Street from Berr Avenue to just West of the High School and Main Street from Jobs Hill Road to East Green, Ellington, Connecticut
- Coordinates: 41°54′15″N 72°28′17″W
- Area: 80 acres (32 ha)
- Architect: Chaffee, Nelson
- Architectural style: Colonial Revival, Greek Revival, Federal
- NRHP reference No.: 90001754
- Added to NRHP: November 15, 1990

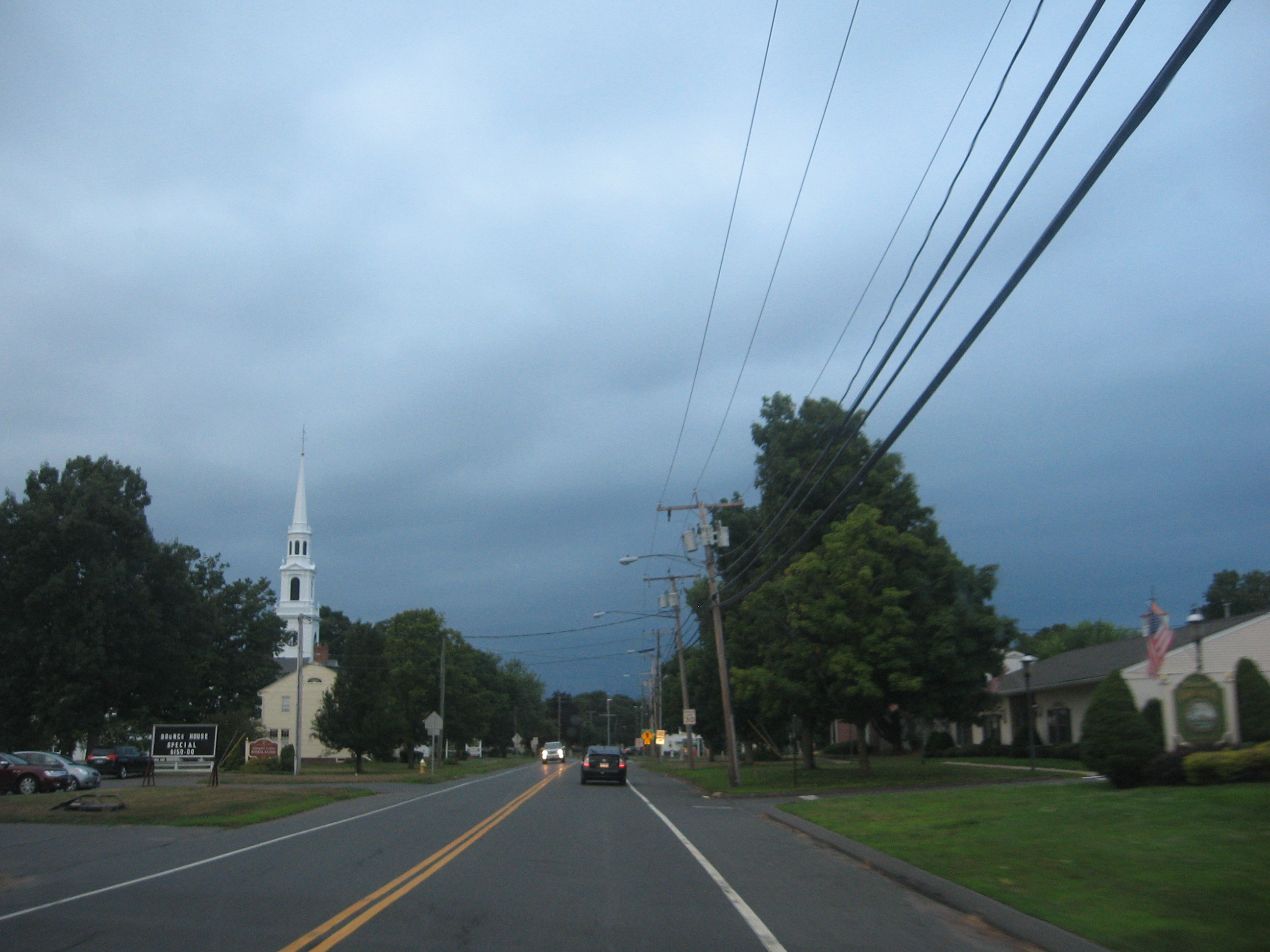
The center of the district with the church in the background

Ellington Center Historic District is an 80-acre (32 ha) historic district in the town of Ellington, Connecticut that was listed on the National Register of Historic Places in 1990.

The historic district encompasses most of Ellington Center, including the town green and buildings that face the green or the streets that lead to it. It includes the Hall Memorial Library. Architecture represented includes the Colonial Revival style and work by Nelson Chaffee. The Ellington green is largely open space with tall shade trees. A granite monument on the green identifies the site of the first meetinghouse in Ellington Center, built in 1739.

The National Register listing included 103 contributing buildings, three contributing sites, and two contributing objects. It also included 26 non-contributing buildings, six non-contributing structures, and three non-contributing objects. The district does not include commercial property east of the green, the town hall and its annex, Center School, and several houses within its general boundaries. Center School, a public elementary school, occupies a brick building constructed in 1949 to replace a structure that was constructed in 1852 as a one-room schoolhouse and later expanded.

Hall Memorial Library, a Neo-Classical Revival building built of brick and limestone, is one of the largest buildings in the historic district. The historic district also includes two churches. The district is notable for its well-preserved examples of Federal-style architecture from the early 19th century, as well as other historic buildings dating from the late 18th century to the early 20th century.

== See also ==
- National Register of Historic Places listings in Tolland County, Connecticut
