= Hall Memorial Library (Ellington, Connecticut) =

- Ellington Center Historic District
- U.S. Historic district – Contributing property
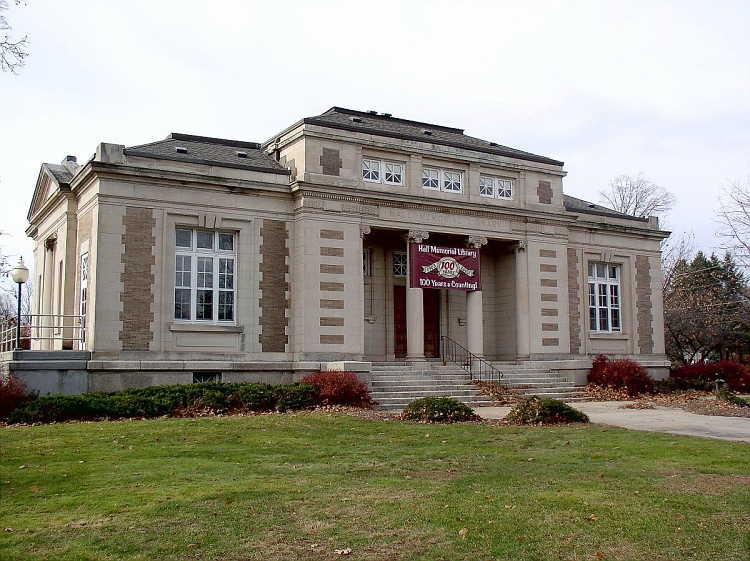

- Location within Connecticut Location within the United States
- Location: Ellington, Connecticut
- Coordinates: 41°54′15″N 72°28′17″W
- Architect: Wilson Potter
- Architectural style: Colonial Revival
- Part of: Ellington Center Historic District (ID90001754)
- Added to NRHP: November 15, 1990

The Hall Memorial Library in Ellington, Connecticut was built in 1903 and was the first free public library in the town. It was designed by New York City architect Wilson Potter.

It is a contributing building in the Ellington Center Historic District, listed on the National Register of Historic Places.

== History ==
The library was a gift to the town of Ellington from Francis Hall, a prominent bookseller and merchant. Hall intended the building as a memorial to his father, Judge John Hall, and his brother, Edward Hall. Both men were highly respected figures in Ellington who had operated the world-renowned Hall School for Boys.

Construction of the library began in the early 20th century; however, Francis Hall passed away before the building was completed. His brothers served as executors of his will, ensuring that his vision for a free public library for the citizens of Ellington was realized. The original 5,000-square-foot facility opened in 1903 and featured stack areas, a reading room, a children’s room, and a second-story picture gallery and meeting space.

In 1992, the library underwent a significant expansion, adding 19,000 square feet to the original structure.
