= Nathaniel Backus House =

Historic house in Connecticut

- U.S. National Register of Historic Places
- U.S. Historic district – Contributing property
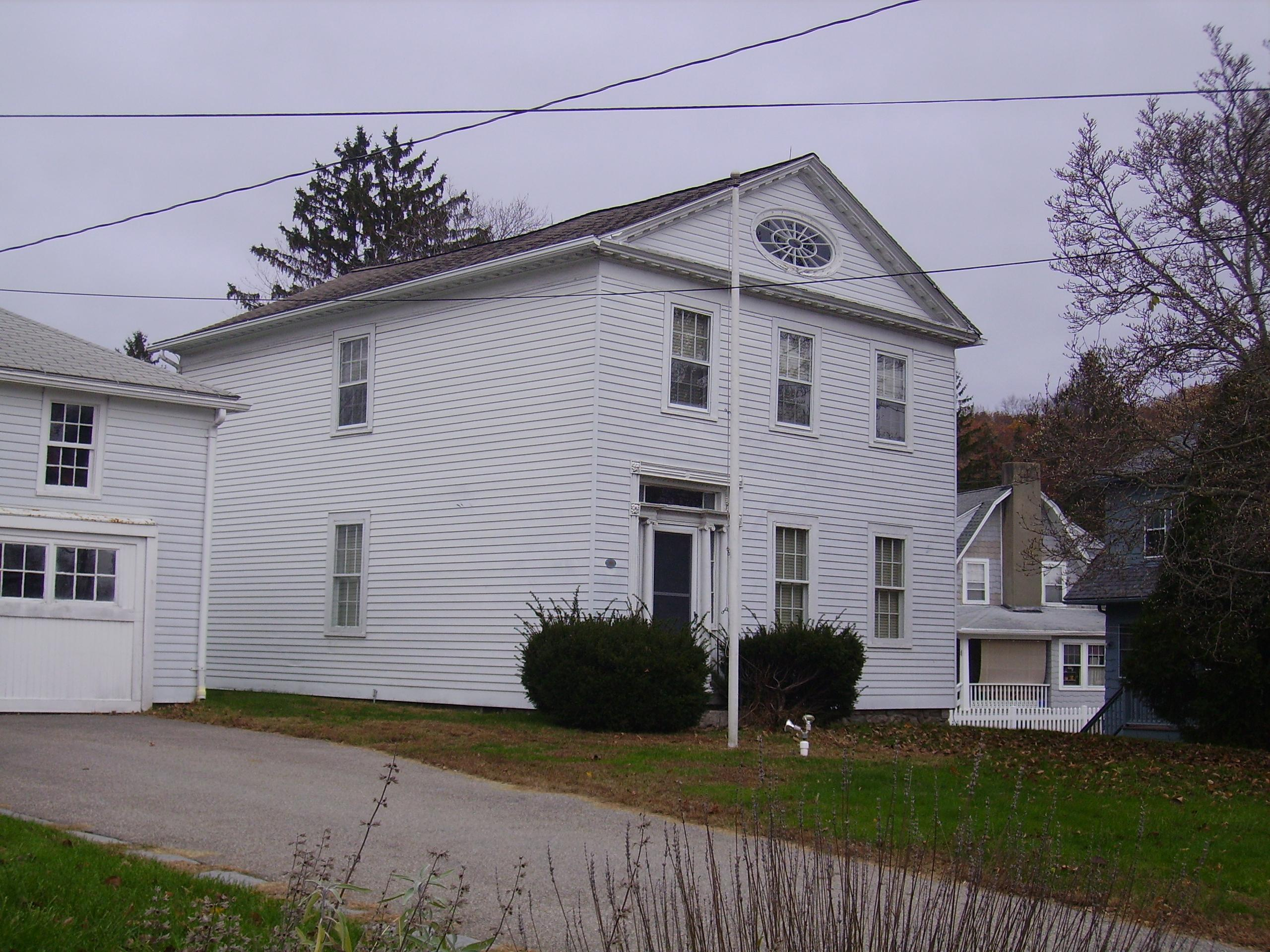

- Location within Connecticut Location within the United States
- Location: 44 Rockwell Street, Norwich, Connecticut
- Coordinates: 41°32′4″N 72°4′42″W
- Area: 2 acres (0.81 ha)
- Built: 1750
- Architectural style: Greek Revival, Colonial
- Part of: Chelsea Parade Historic District (ID88003215)
- NRHP reference No.: 70000715

Significant dates
- Added to NRHP: October 6, 1970
- Designated CP: May 12, 1989

The Nathaniel Backus House is a two-story Greek Revival clapboarded house with a gable roof in Norwich, Connecticut. The house was built around 1750 by Nathaniel Backus and served as his home. It was moved to its current location in 1952. The house began as a Colonial structure, but it was greatly modified to Greek Revival around 1825, reconfiguring the central door to the left of the facade and adding two chimneys. It is a historic house museum operated by the Faith Trumbull Chapter of the Daughters of the American Revolution.

The Nathaniel Backus House was submitted to the National Register of Historic Places for its historical value in local history and as an example of Greek Revival domestic architecture. It was listed on the National Register of Historic Places (NRHP) in 1970 and was also included in the Chelsea Parade Historic District in 1989.

== Nathaniel Backus ==
Nathaniel Backus was a descendant of William Backus and William Backus Jr., two of the founders of Norwich, Connecticut. He was born on April 5, 1704, and he married Hannah Baldwin in 1726. They had seven children. Backus was one of six men in Norwich who owned a carriage before the American Revolutionary War. Nathaniel Backus died in 1773.

== Design ==
The Nathaniel Backus House's construction date is unknown, but it is believed to have been around 1750. The History of Norwich, Connecticut places it around 1734 and mentions a highway being added in 1750 that went past Nathaniel Backus's house. The Daughters of the American Revolution indicated that it dates from 1750 in the 1970 National Historic Register of Places nomination.

The house originally stood on Broadway Street in the center of Norwich, Connecticut. It was originally Colonial at its time of construction, but has been modified to Greek Revival style. The renovation itself may date to around 1825. (Note: Connecticut: A Guide to Its Roads, Lore and People uses 1825–1830 as its date, but records show its existence before 1750. The date, however, approximates the substantial renovations and alterations to the house.) The house is a white two-story clapboarded structure with its gable end facing the street. The three-bay facade faces south and the front entrance is located on the left bay. The eaves cornice is decorated with mutules that span the length of the gable ends and combines with the roof cornice to make a pediment that encloses an elliptical window in the center. The window is of the "rising sun" pattern with glass panes radiating out through two rings. The entrance on the left of the facade has a paneled door that is enclosed in a rectangular frame, supported by Ionic columns and framed by fluted moldings. The frames of the six-over-six windows project slightly from the clapboard exterior. The foundation and steps to the house are of stone.

Two chimneys were added, and there were additional alterations to the window and door openings on the northeast and southwest sides of the house. The Connecticut Historical Commission believed that the central door and window alterations were completed as part of the Greek Revival renovations. Luyster states, "Further investigation would undoubtedly reveal additional changes in the interior, including changes in the position of the fireplaces and their chimney connections."

== Importance ==
The Nathaniel Backus House is a historic house museum operated by the Faith Trumbull Chapter of the Daughters of the American Revolution. It was submitted to the National Register of Historic Places for its historical value in local history and as an example of Greek Revival domestic architecture. Luyster writes, "The simplicity of the Backus house contrasts pleasantly with the verandahs and asymmetric forms of the surrounding buildings." It was listed on the National Register of Historic Places in 1970. The house was also included as part of the Chelsea Parade Historic District in 1989.

== See also ==
- National Register of Historic Places listings in New London County, Connecticut
- Perkins-Rockwell House - another historic home located next door to the Nathaniel Backus House that is owned by the Faith Trumbull Chapter of the Daughters of the American Revolution
