= James Martin Gray =

American academic administrator and pastor (1851–1935)

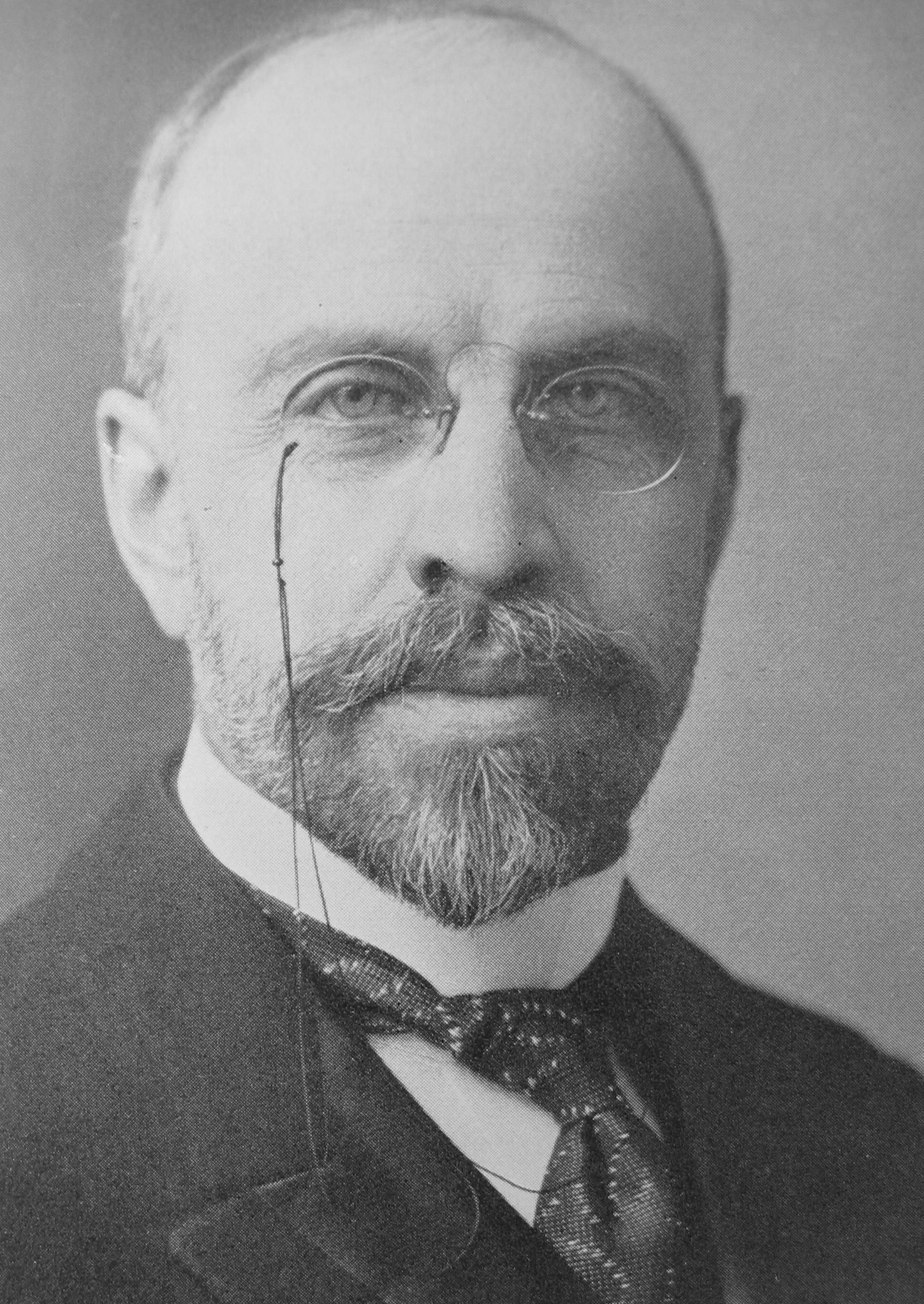
- Born: May 11, 1851; New York City
- Died: September 21, 1935 (aged 84); Chicago
- Occupations: Episcopal pastor, writer

James Martin Gray (May 11, 1851 – September 21, 1935) was a pastor in the Reformed Episcopal Church, a Bible scholar, editor, hymn writer, and the president of Moody Bible Institute, 1904–34.

== Biography ==
Gray was born in New York City as one of the younger of eight children. His father, Hugh Gray, died shortly after his birth. James Gray was raised in the Episcopal church, and probably after attending college in New York, he began training for a career as a priest. While preparing himself for the ministry, Gray experienced an evangelical conversion (mostly likely in 1873) after reading homilies on the book of Proverbs by William Arnot. In 1870, Gray married Amanda Thorne, who died in 1875 while giving birth to their fifth child, who also died.

As Gray continued to prepare himself for the ministry in New York, the Episcopal Church was troubled by a conflict between evangelicals and Tractarians, who wished to emphasize ritualism. In 1873, Bishop George D. Cummins resigned from the Episcopal Church and helped found the Reformed Episcopal denomination. Gray sided with the seceders.

Gray was ordained in 1877, and assumed the pastorate of the Church of the Redemption in Brooklyn, New York for one year. He spent another year at the Church of the Corner-Stone in Newburgh. In 1879, Gray was called to assist an elderly pastor at the small Reformed Episcopal Church in Boston, which prospered after his arrival and grew from a handful of worshipers to a congregation of more than 230. The Boston church also managed to establish three additional churches during Gray's pastorate, all of which failed shortly after his departure.

While in Boston, he also became involved with Adoniram Judson Gordon in the founding of the Boston Bible and Missionary Training School, later Gordon Divinity School, where he was a professor from 1889 to 1904. In Boston, he married Susan G. Gray, who also served on the faculty. During this period, Bates College, Lewiston, Maine, conferred on Gray an honorary doctor of divinity degree.

From 1901 to 1903, Gray published 104 articles in the Union Gospel News.

Throughout the 1890s, Gray worked alongside D. L. Moody in the latter's evangelistic campaigns in New York, Boston, and Chicago; and Gray became connected Moody Bible Institute serving in a variety of positions from summer guest lecturer (beginning in 1892) to dean, executive secretary, and finally, president (the third, after D. L. Moody and R. A. Torrey) from 1904 to 1934. Gray also edited Moody Monthly and preached at Moody's Chicago Avenue Church (later known as the Moody Church).

Theologically, Gray was an early fundamentalist who upheld the inspiration of the Bible and opposed a contemporary trend toward a social gospel. Gray was also a dispensationalist who believed in the premillennial, pre-tribulational return of Jesus Christ at the Rapture. Personally, Gray was conservative in dress and personal habit. A reporter remarked that he "cultivated gentlemanliness as a fine art." Male students at Moody were required to wear coats and ties in the dining room, and during a hot spell in July 1908, Gray admonished faculty members for taking off their coats and vests in their offices.

Gray was one of the seven editors of the first Scofield Reference Bible in 1909. Gray wrote 25 books and pamphlets, some of which remain in print. He also wrote a number of hymns, perhaps the best known of which is Only a Sinner, Saved by Grace.

On November 1, 1934, he resigned as President of MBI at the age of 83, but continued to serve as President-Emeritus. He died of a heart attack on September 21, 1935. The Torrey-Gray Auditorium at the Moody Bible Institute is named in honor of Gray and his predecessor, R. A. Torrey.

== Works ==
- The Errors of "Millennial Dawnism". Chicago: Bible Institute Colportage Association, 1871.
- The History of the Holy Dead. New York: Fleming H. Revell, 1896.
- Bulwarks of the Faith. Elgin, IL: Brethren Publishing House, 1899.
- Primers of the Faith: Biblical Introduction and Christian Evidences. Chicago: Fleming H. Revell, 1906
- Synthetic Bible Studies. New York: Fleming H. Revell, 1906.
- The Antidote to Christian Science: How to Deal with It from the Bible and Christian Point of View. New York: Fleming H. Revell, 1907.
- Scofield Reference Bible, editor. 1909
- Satan and the Saint: The Present Darkness and the Coming Light. Chicago: The Bible Institute Colportage Association, c1909.
- Great Epochs of Sacred History and the Shadows They Cast. New York: Fleming H. Revell, 1910.
- Progress in the Life to Come (A new edition of The History of the Holy Dead). New York: Fleming H. Revell, c1910.
- Salvation from Start to Finish. New York: Fleming H. Revell, c1911.
- Bible Problems Explained. New York: Fleming H. Revell, c1913.
- Christian Workers' Commentary on the Old and New Testaments. New York: Fleming H. Revell, c1915.
- Prophecy and the Lord's Return: A Collection of Popular Articles and Addresses. New York: Fleming H. Revell, 1917.
- Picture of the Resurrection. New York: Fleming H. Revell, c1917.
- What the Bible Teaches about War and the Christian's Attitude in the Present Crisis. Chicago: Moody Bible Institute, 1917
- A Textbook on Prophecy. New York: Fleming H. Revell, 1918
- Spiritism and the Fallen Angels in the Light of the Old and New Testaments. New York: Fleming H. Revell, c1920.
- Christ in the Sacrificial Offerings: Bible Studies in Leviticus. Chicago: The Bible Institute Colportage Association, 1924
- My Faith in Jesus Christ: A Personal Testimony. New York: Fleming H. Revell, c1927
- Teaching and Preaching that Counts. New York: Fleming H. Revell, 1934.
- The Holy Spirit in Doctrine and Life. New York: Fleming H. Revell, c1936.
- How to Master the English Bible. Chicago: Moody Press, 1951.
- Mountain Peaks of Prophecy. New York: Christian Herald Bible House, N.d.
- The Story of My Conversion. Chicago: Moody Bible Institute, N.d.
- The Concise Bible Commentary, Hendrickson Publishers (current edition) ISBN 1-56563-393-8
