= High Victorian Gothic =

Mid-late C19 architectural style and movement

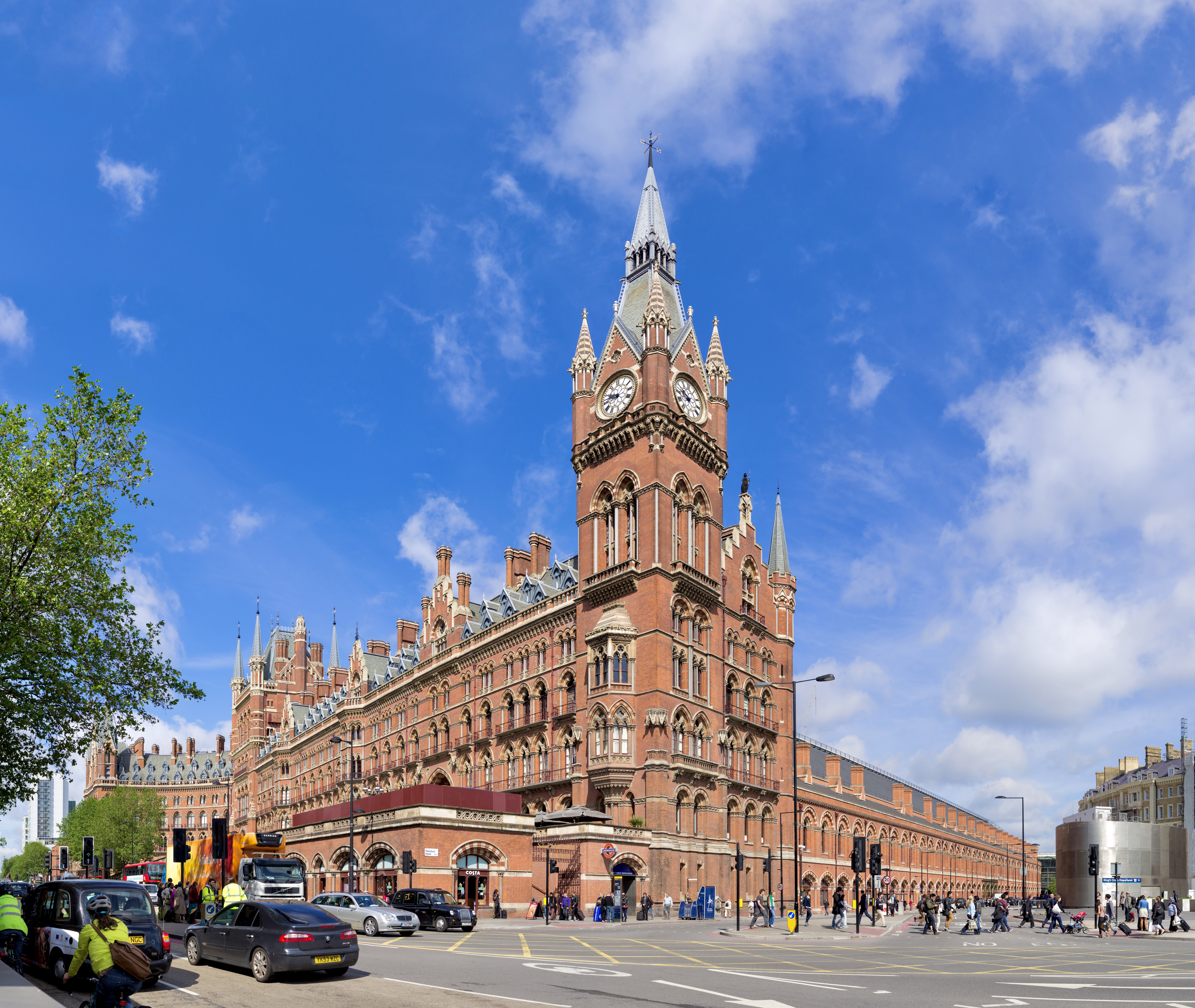
St Pancras railway station by Sir Gilbert Scott

High Victorian Gothic was an eclectic architectural style and movement during the mid-late 19th century. It is seen by architectural historians as either a sub-style of the broader Gothic Revival style, or a separate style in its own right.

Promoted and derived from the works of the art critic and architectural writer John Ruskin, though it eventually diverged, it is sometimes referred to as Ruskinian Gothic. It is characterised by the use of polychrome (multi-colour) decoration, "use of varying texture" and Gothic details. The architectural scholar James Stevens Curl describes it thus: "Style of the somewhat harsh polychrome structures of the Gothic Revival in the 1850s and 1860s when Ruskin held sway as the arbiter of taste. Like High Gothic, it is an unsatisfactory term, as it poses the question as to what is 'Low Victorian'. 'Mid-Victorian' would, perhaps, be more useful, but precise dates and description of styles would be more so."

Among the best-known practitioners of the style were William Butterfield, Sir Gilbert Scott, G. E. Street, and Alfred Waterhouse. Waterhouse's Victoria Building at Liverpool University, described by Sir Charles Reilly (an opponent of Victorian Gothic) as "the colour of mud and blood," was the inspiration for the term "red brick university" (as opposed to Oxbridge and the other ancient universities).

The style began appearing in the United States, particularly New York, in the early 1860s with the work of English-born architects Frederick Clarke Withers, Jacob Wrey Mould, and Americans Edward Tuckerman Potter and Peter Bonnett Wight. By 1870, the style became popular nationwide for civic, commercial, and religious architecture, though it was uncommon for residential structures. It was frequently used for what became the "Old Main" of various schools and universities in the late 19th century United States. The Stick Style is sometimes considered the wooden manifestation of the High Victorian Gothic style.

== Examples ==
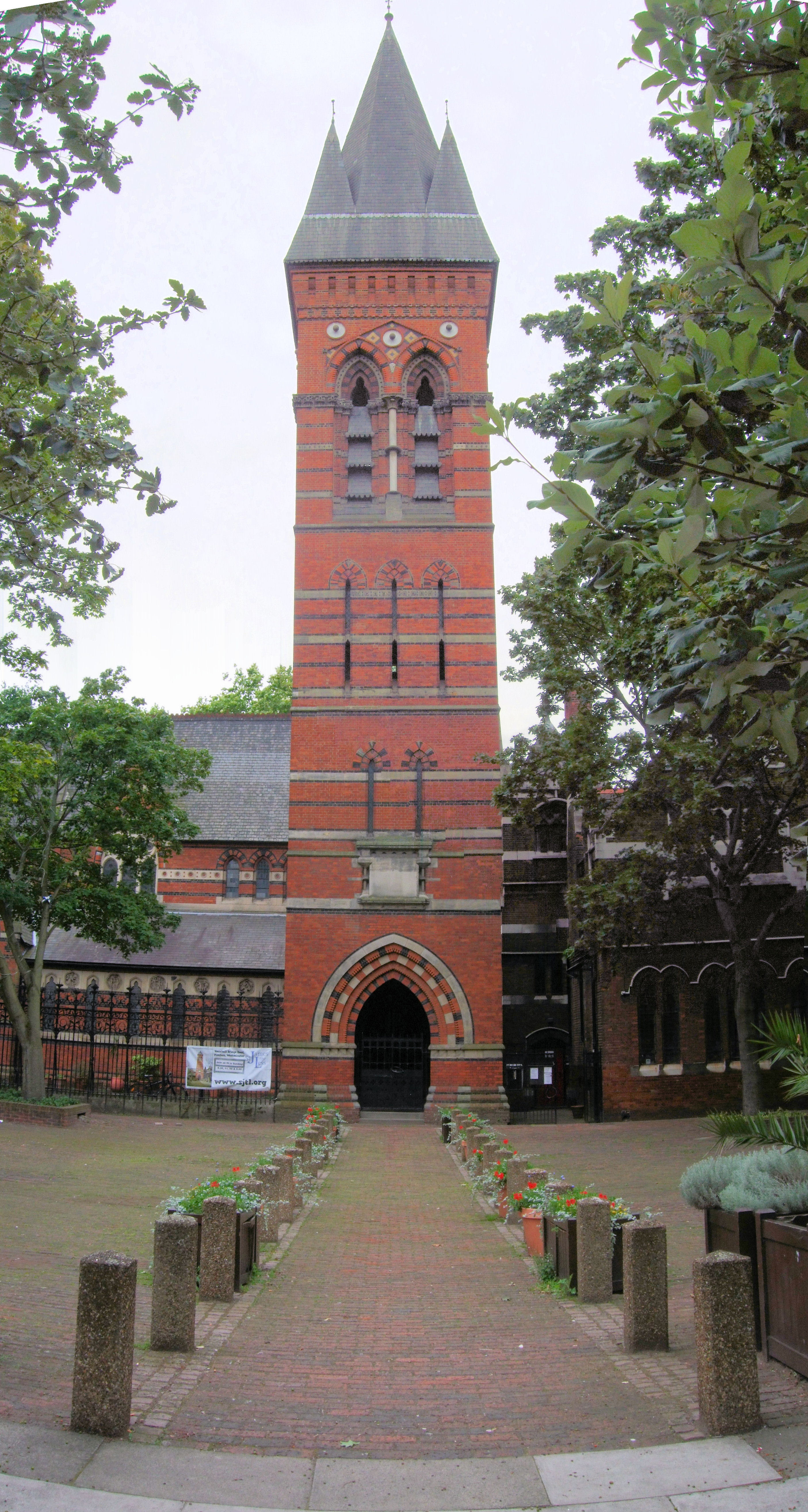
St James the Less, Pimlico, by G. E. Street

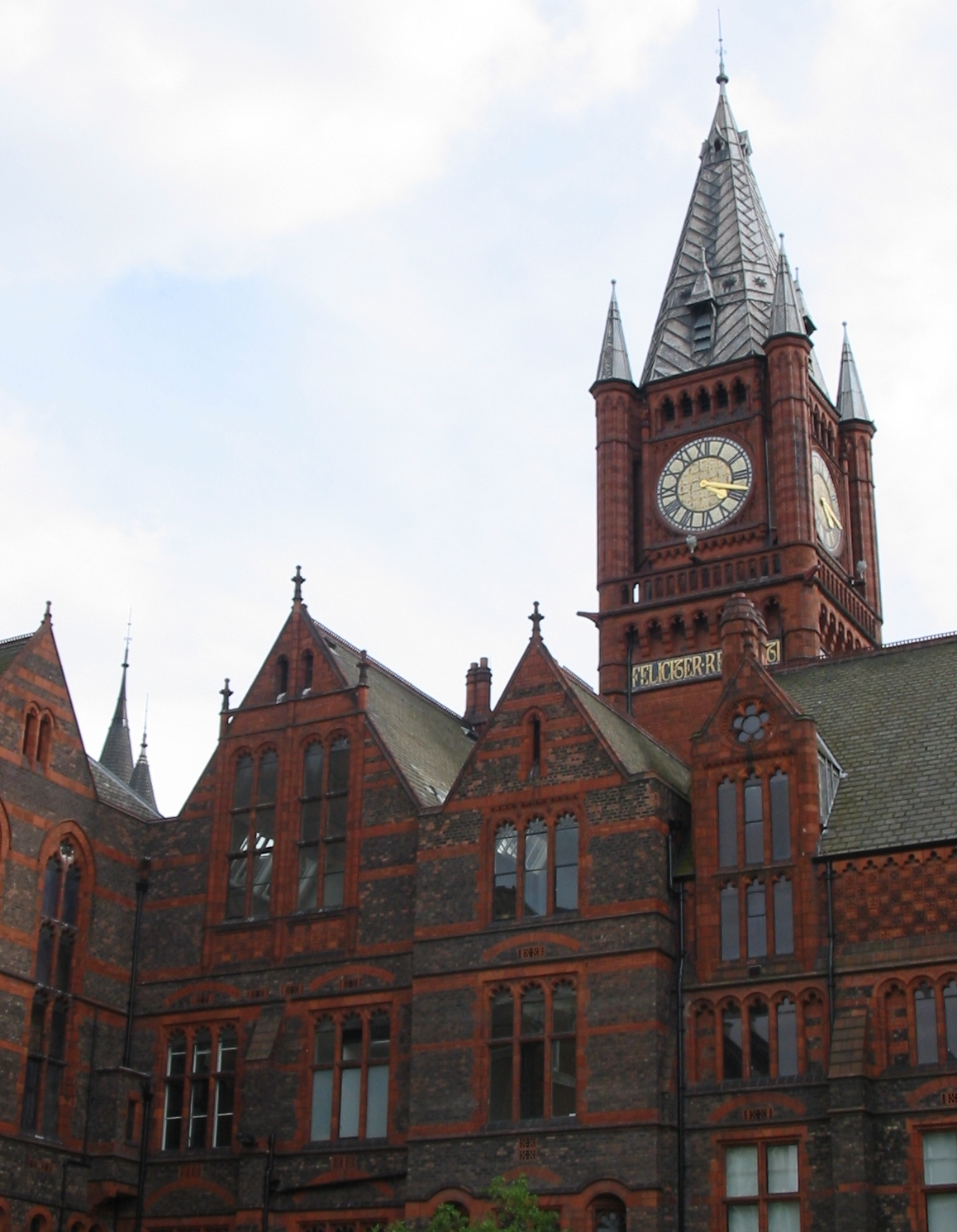
Victoria Building, Liverpool University, by Alfred Waterhouse

Canada

- Belleville City Hall, Belleville, Ontario, 1873

Lithuania

- Lentvaris Manor, Lentvaris, 1869

United Kingdom

- All Saints, Margaret Street, London. Butterfield, 1849–59
- Church of St James, Baldersby, Yorkshire. Butterfield, 1856–58
- Manchester Town Hall. Waterhouse, 1863–77
- Albert Memorial, London. Scott, 1872
- Royal Courts of Justice, London. Street, 1873–82
- The Kirna, Walkerburn, Scottish Borders, 1867

United States

- Hudson River State Hospital, Poughkeepsie, New York
- Jefferson Market Courthouse, New York, New York
- Memorial Hall (Harvard University), Cambridge, Massachusetts
- New Haven City Hall and County Courthouse, New Haven, Connecticut
- Converse House and Barn, Norwich, Connecticut
- The Miller School of Albemarle, Albemarle County, Virginia (1878-1884)
- Anderson Hall (Manhattan, Kansas), Kansas State University

== In the United States ==
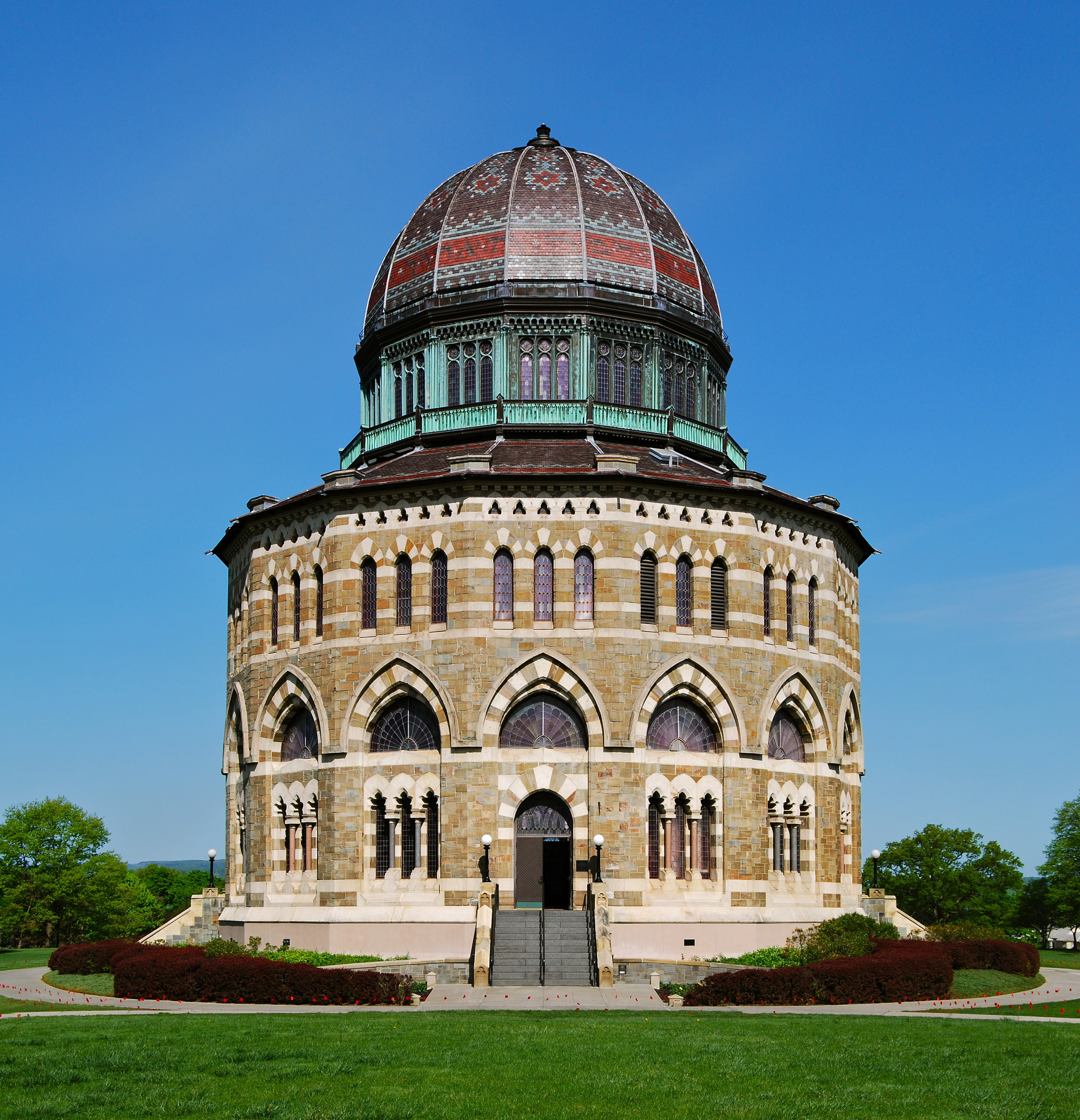
Nott Memorial (1858–79), Union College, Schenectady, New York. Edward T. Potter, architect.

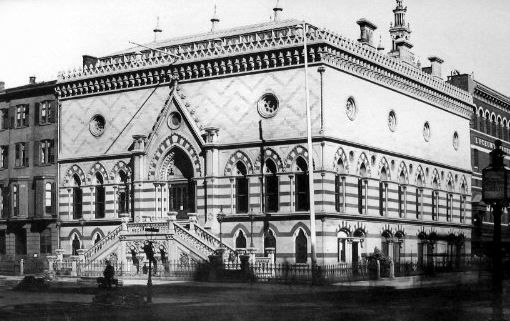
National Academy of Design (1861), New York, New York. Peter B. Wight, architect.

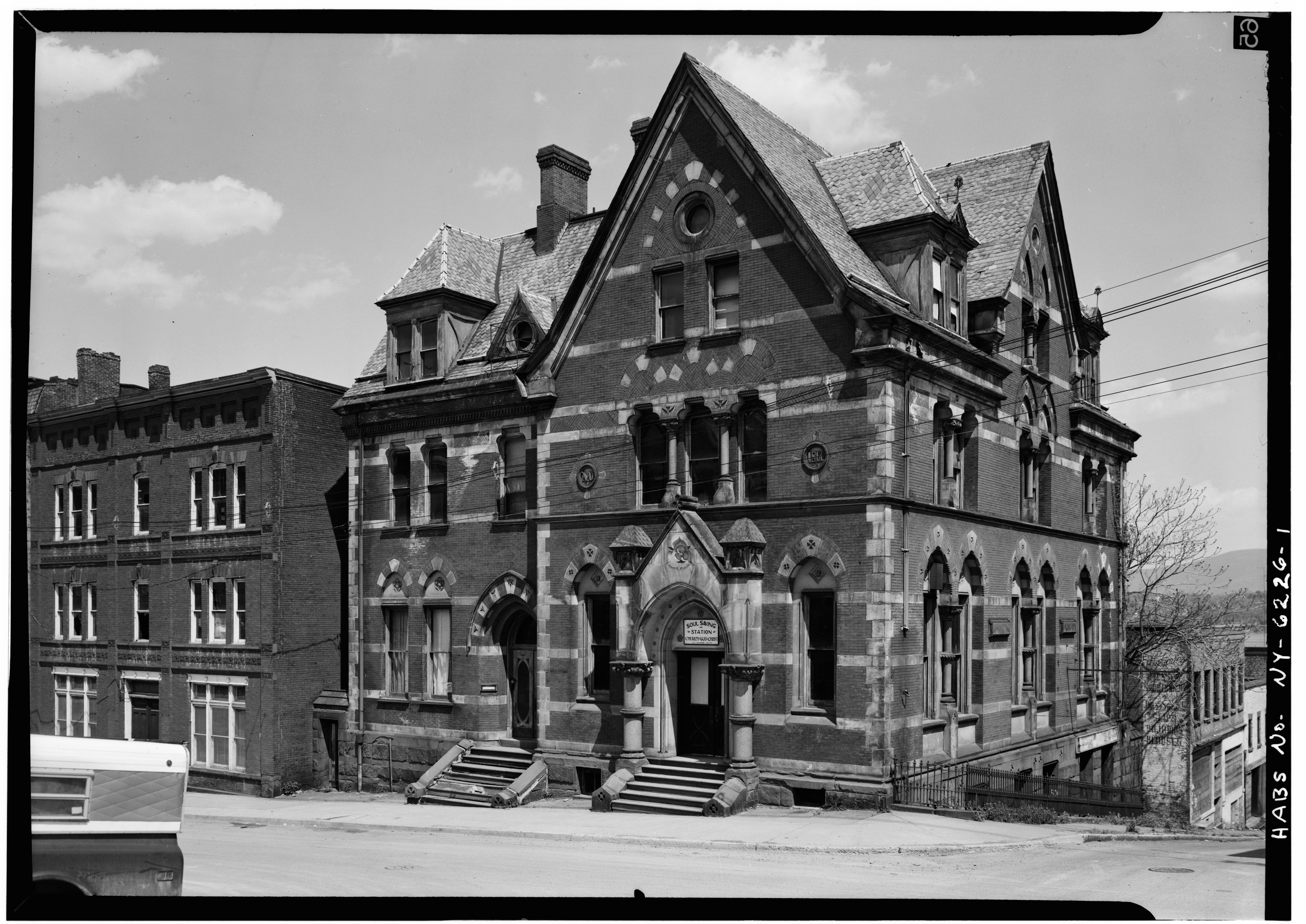
Newburgh Savings Bank (1866–68), Newburgh, New York. Frederick C. Withers, architect.

Church of the Good Shepherd (1867), Hartford, Connecticut. Edward T. Potter, architect.

Interior, Pennsylvania Academy of the Fine Arts (1871–76), Philadelphia, Pennsylvania. Furness & Hewitt, architects.

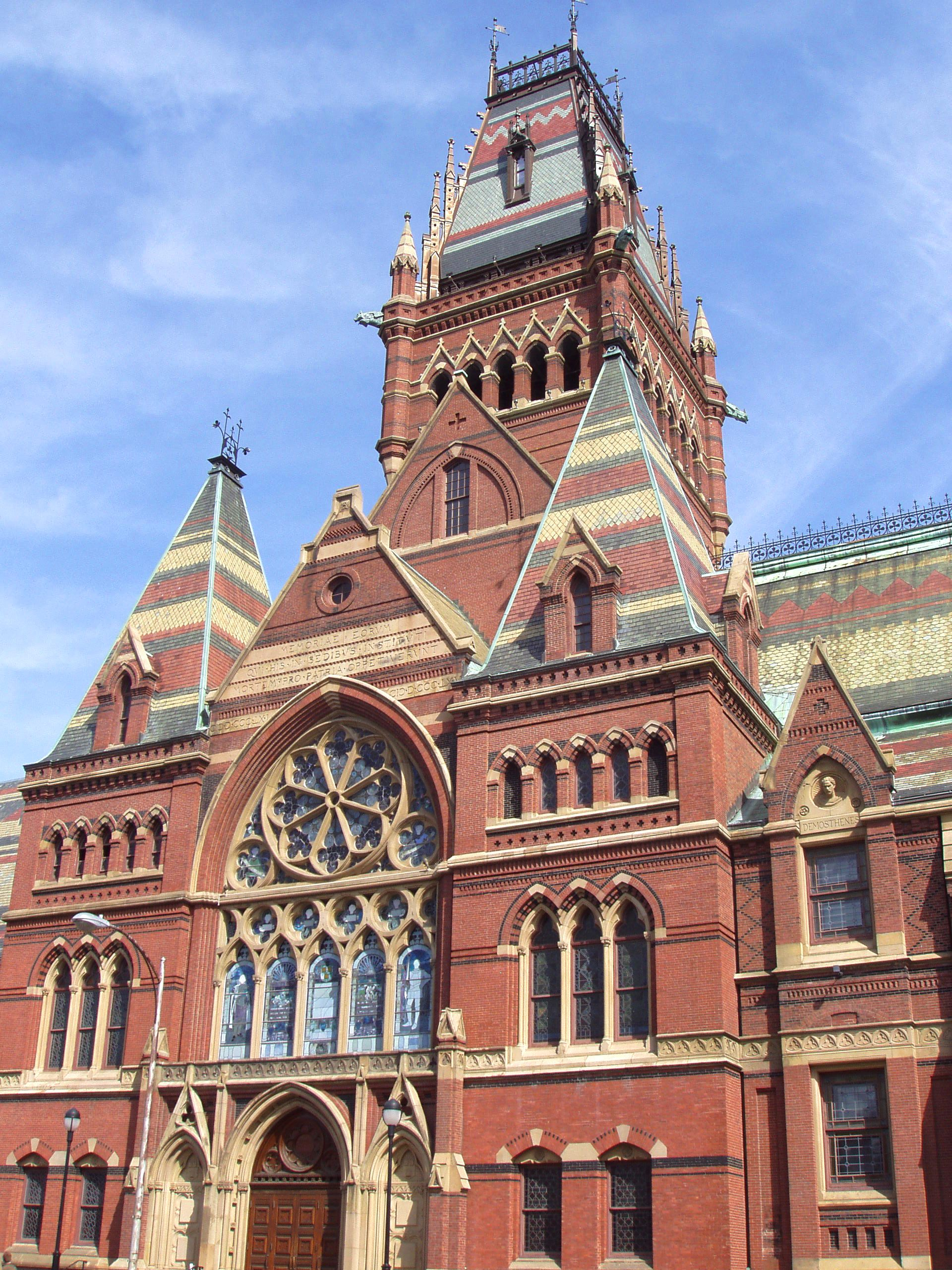
Memorial Hall, Harvard University (1870–77), Cambridge, Massachusetts. Ware & Van Brunt, architects.

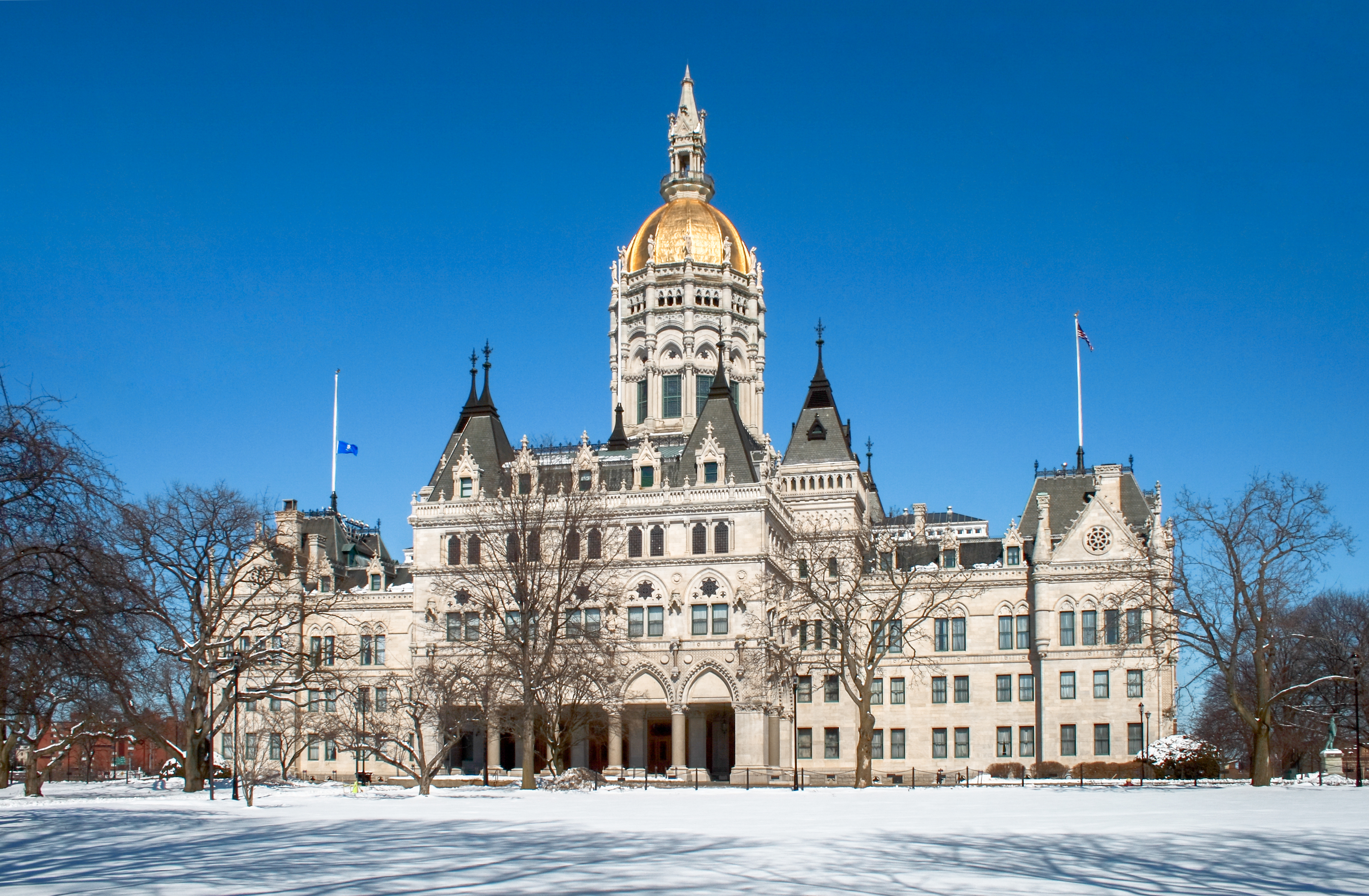
Connecticut State Capitol (1872–78), Hartford, Connecticut. Richard M. Upjohn, architect.

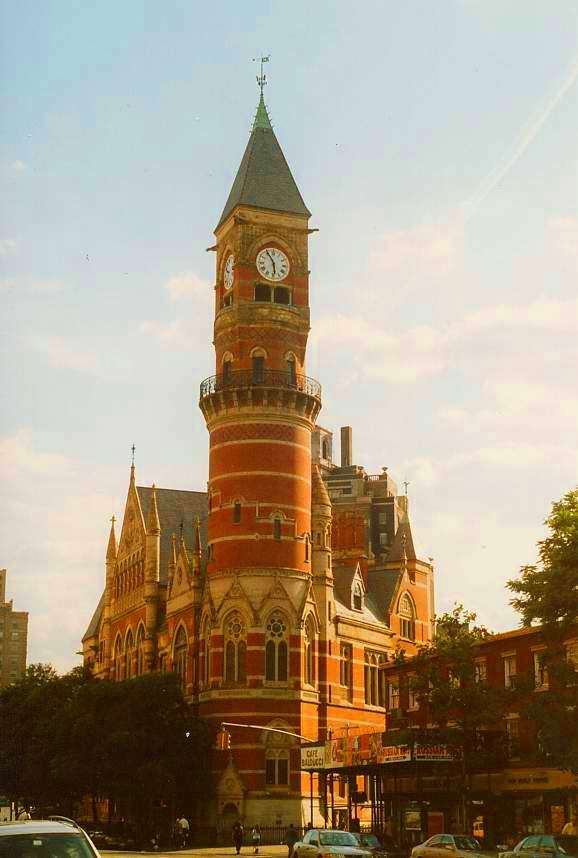
Jefferson Market Courthouse (1874–75), New York, New York. Frederick C. Withers and Calvert Vaux, architects.

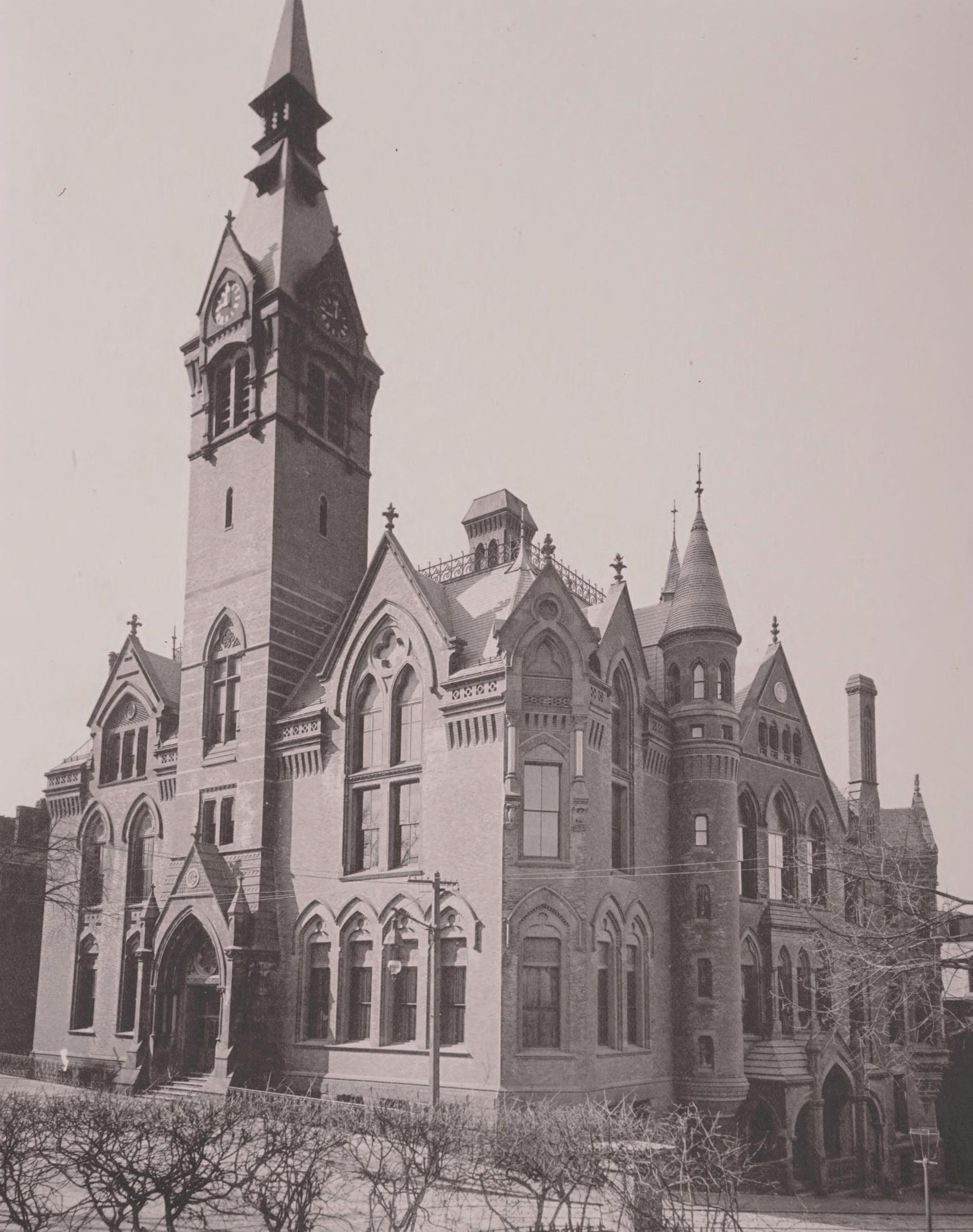
Providence County Courthouse (1875), Providence, Rhode Island. Stone & Carpenter, architects.

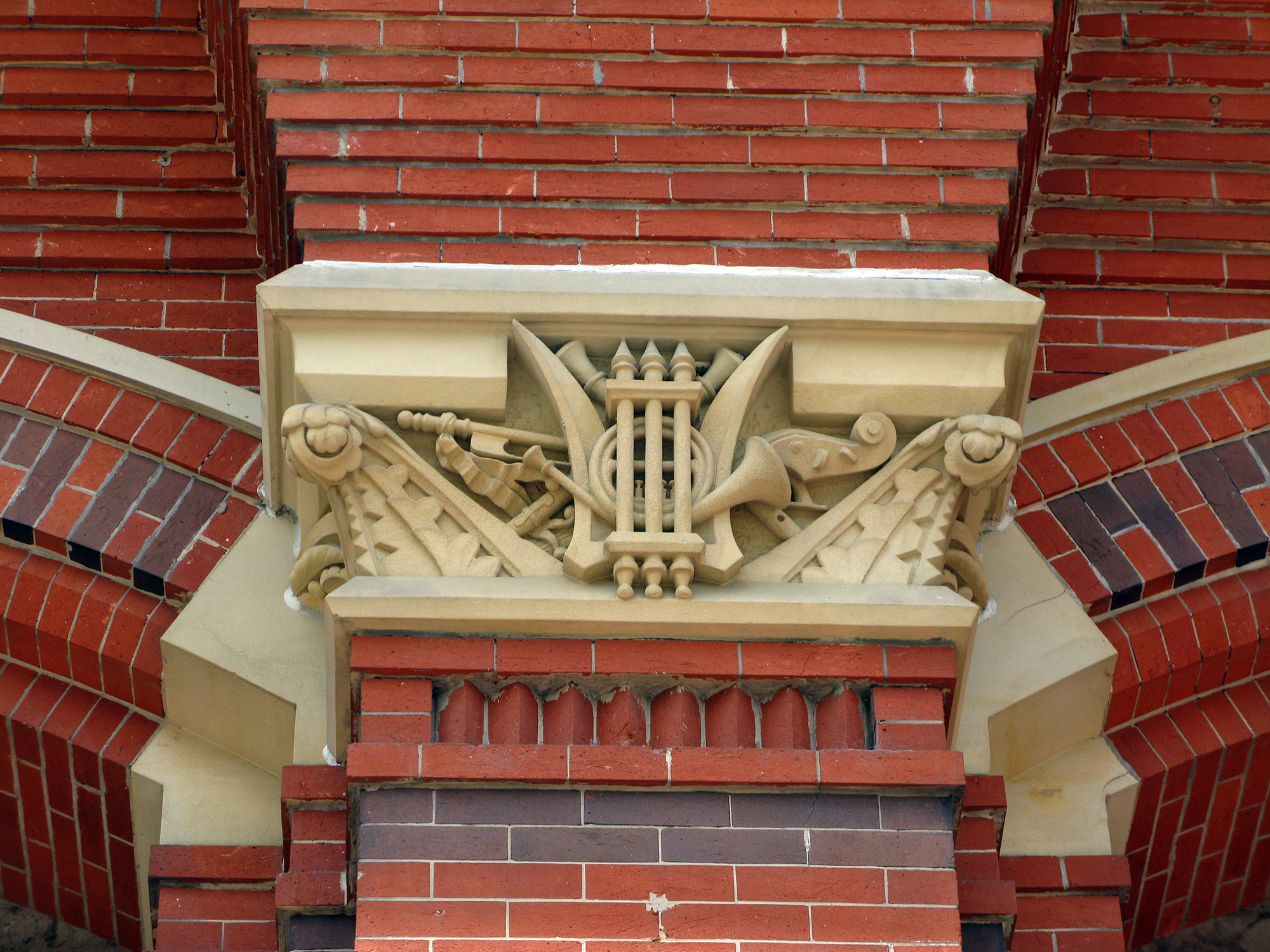
Detail of carving, Cincinnati Music Hall (1876–78), Cincinnati, Ohio. Samuel Hannaford & Sons, architects.

== See also ==
- Victorian architecture
- Venetian Gothic architecture
