= Broad Street School =

- U.S. National Register of Historic Places
- U.S. Historic district – Contributing property
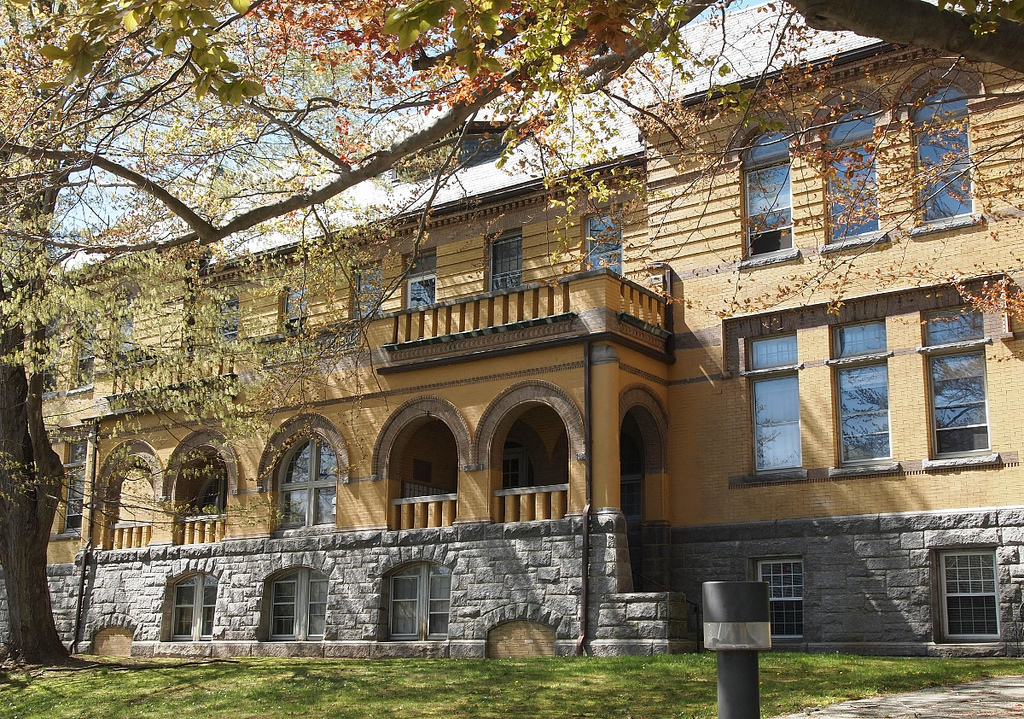

- Location within Connecticut Location within the United States
- Interactive map showing the location for Broad Street School
- Location: 100 Broad Street, Norwich, Connecticut
- Coordinates: 41°32′5″N 72°4′35″W
- Area: 0.8 acres (0.32 ha)
- Built: 1897
- Architect: Potter, Wilson
- Architectural style: Romanesque
- Part of: Chelsea Parade Historic District (ID88003215)
- NRHP reference No.: 84001162

Significant dates
- Added to NRHP: January 19, 1984
- Designated CP: May 12, 1989

The Broad Street School is a historic former school building at 100 Broad Street in Norwich, Connecticut. The school was designed by New York City architect Wilson Potter and built in 1897. It is a well-executed and well-preserved example of Romanesque styling, and was the largest school built as part of a major construction program by the city. The schoolhouse was listed on the National Register of Historic Places on January 19, 1984. It has been converted to residential use.

== Description and history ==
The Broad Street School building is located in a residential area north of downtown Norwich, on a lot bounded on the north by Rockwell Street and the south by Broad Street. It is a two-story masonry structure, with a granite foundation, yellow brick exterior with trim elements of brown brick and granite, and slate hip roof. It is T-shaped in layout, with a central block flanked by slightly projecting wings, and a projecting section at the rear. The central block facade is fronted by a project porch with an arcade of round-arch openings topped by a low balustrade. The arches are finished in brown brick, with a brick string course separating the arches from the porch eave. The exterior brick was made in New Galilee, Pennsylvania, by the Beaver Clay Manufacturing Company.

The school was built in 1897 to a design by Wilson Potter, a well-known New York City architect who had already executed several commissions for Connecticut school districts. The school exemplified state-of-the-art thinking about school buildings, providing high ceilings with well-lit classrooms, facilities segregated by grade and sex, and indoor plumbing. It was among those featured in a state education commissioner's report in 1902.

== See also ==
- National Register of Historic Places listings in New London County, Connecticut
