= Chelsea Parade Historic District =

Historic district in Connecticut

- U.S. National Register of Historic Places
- U.S. Historic district
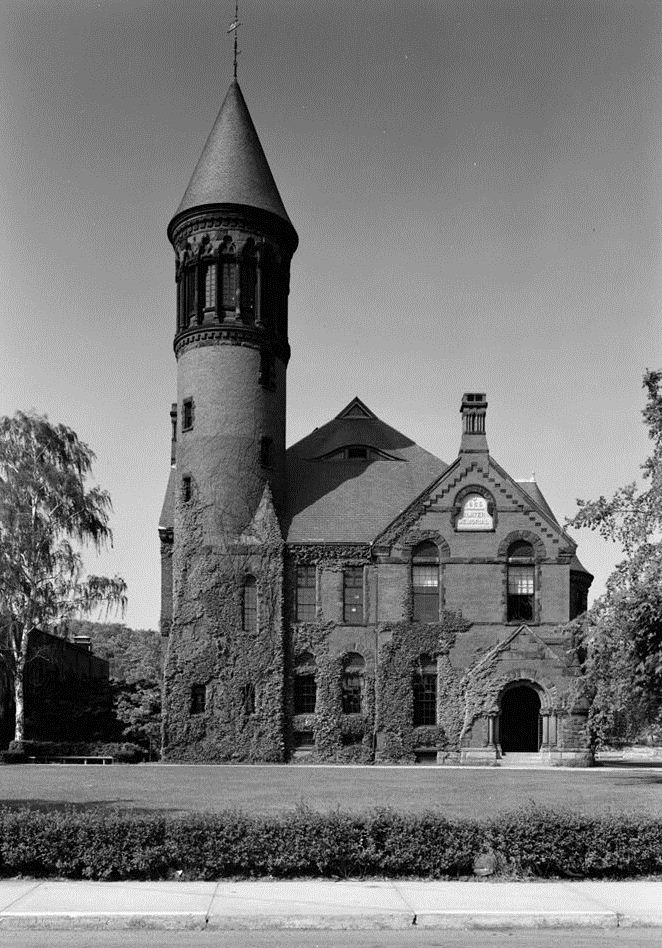
- John Fox Slater Memorial Museum in 1958

- Location within Connecticut Location within the United States
- Location: Roughly bounded by Crescent, Broad, Grove, McKinley, Perkins, Slater, Buckingham, Maple Grove, Washington, and Lincoln, Norwich, Connecticut
- Coordinates: 41°32′1″N 72°4′55″W
- Area: 205 acres (83 ha)
- Built: 1850
- Architect: Wilson Potter
- Architectural style: Mid 19th Century Revival, late 19th and 20th Century Revivals, late Victorian
- NRHP reference No.: 88003215
- Added to NRHP: May 12, 1989

The Chelsea Parade Historic District encompasses a predominantly residential area north of downtown Norwich, centered around the Chelsea Parade, a triangular public park. The area has long been a preferred residential area for the city's upper classes, and includes a catalog of architecture from the 18th to 20th centuries. It includes 565 contributing buildings, two other contributing sites, and six contributing objects over an area of 205 acres (83 ha). The district was listed on the National Register of Historic Places in 1989.

== Description and history ==
Norwich's first area of settlement was Norwichtown near the Yantic River, but it quickly developed a commercial port called Chelsea Landing further south, where the Yantic and Shetucket Rivers meet to form the Thames. Chelsea Parade was initially common pastureland, but the area was subdivided in 1726, and roads were built through the area in 1740 joining Norwichtown and the port. By the late 18th century, Norwich was the largest city in Connecticut. The Chelsea Parade area was a desirable residential area beginning in the 18th century, where the city's wealthy built their houses. It was set aside as a public common in 1797, and gradually became more like a public park around which residential and civic buildings were built. It continued to be a fashionable address through the 19th century, as the city's business shifted from maritime commerce to textiles and other manufacturing, powered by the nearby rivers. One of the finest estates near the Parade was established by John Fox Slater, the grandson of early textile pioneer Samuel Slater. The Slaters supported the founding of Norwich Free Academy, located in the district, as well as founding the Slater Memorial Museum.

The historic district is roughly in the shape of a teardrop, with Washington Street and Broadway as its principal thoroughfares which flank the Parade. It encompasses several properties previously listed on the National Register, including the Nathaniel Backus House, the Broad Street School, and the Converse House and Barn. Other notable buildings include the Park Congregational Church (UCC) and St. Patrick Cathedral.

== See also ==
- Neighborhoods of Norwich, Connecticut
- National Register of Historic Places listings in New London County, Connecticut
