= South School (Torrington, Connecticut) =

- U.S. National Register of Historic Places
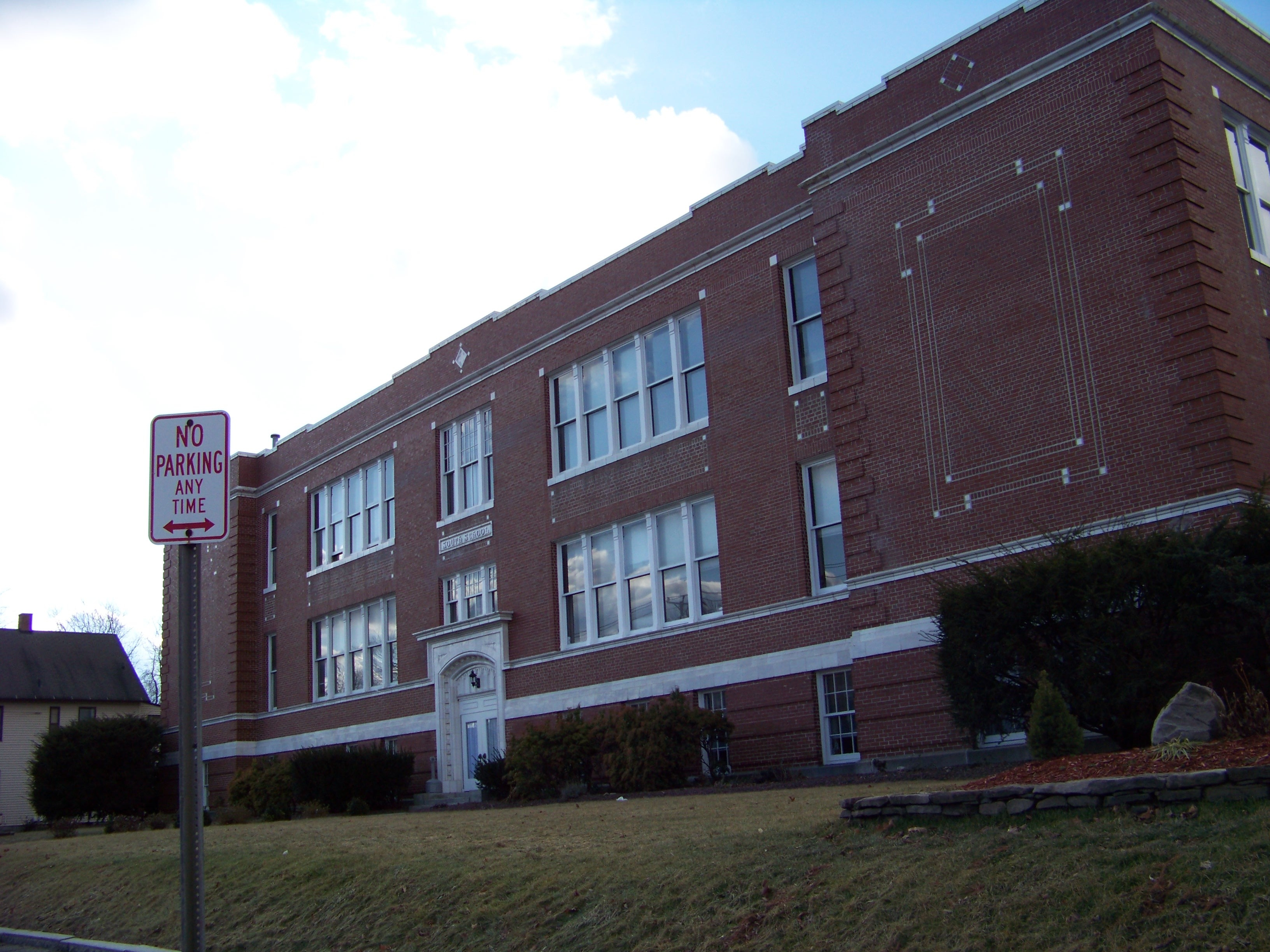

- Location within Connecticut Location within the United States
- Location: 362 South Main Street, Torrington, Connecticut
- Coordinates: 41°47′36″N 73°7′17″W
- Area: less than one acre
- Built: 1915
- Architect: Potter, Wilson
- Architectural style: Beaux Arts
- NRHP reference No.: 86000522
- Added to NRHP: March 27, 1986

The South School is a historic school building at 362 South Main Street in Torrington, Connecticut. It is a Beaux Arts architecture building, designed by Wilson Potter and completed in 1915. It was listed on the National Register of Historic Places in 1986. It is significant as a well-preserved example of the work of Potter, a New York City-based designer of schools throughout the Northeastern United States, and as a prototype for other schools built in Torrington. The building has been renovated for use as residential apartments. In 2010, a sign describes it as "South School Garden View Apartments".

== Description and history ==
The South School is located in a mixed residential-commercial area south of downtown Torrington, at the southwest corner of South Main Street and Brooker Street. It is a large two-story brick building, with a flat roof, granite foundation, and terra cotta trim. The basement is elevated, with a stringcourse of trim separating it from the main levels. The main facade is broadly divided into three sections, with a central section with bands of sash windows flanked by a slightly projecting end sections with blank walls adorned by patterned brick and trim. The corners of the end sections have brick quoining, and the building is topped by a low parapet with wide stepped crenellations highlighted by a terra cotta border. The main entrance is set at the center of the basement level, in a richly decorated segmented-arch surround.

The school was built in 1915 to a design by Wilson Potter, a prominent New York City architect known for his school designs; Potter was also credited with the design of the 1914 Torrington High School, now much altered and no longer the high school. This building was the first large-scale elementary school for the city, and served as a prototype for schools it built through the 1930s. The building was used as a school until 1981.

== See also ==
- National Register of Historic Places listings in Litchfield County, Connecticut
