= Converse House and Barn =

Historic house in Connecticut

- U.S. National Register of Historic Places
- U.S. Historic district – Contributing property
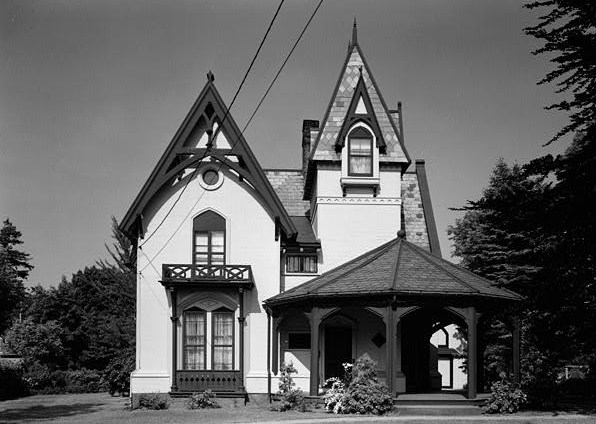
- Colonel Converse House

- Location within Connecticut Location within the United States
- Location: 185 Washington Street, Norwich, Connecticut
- Coordinates: 41°32′3″N 72°5′0″W
- Area: 2 acres (0.81 ha)
- Built: 1870
- Architectural style: Gothic
- Part of: Chelsea Parade Historic District (ID88003215)
- NRHP reference No.: 70000716

Significant dates
- Added to NRHP: October 6, 1970
- Designated CP: May 12, 1989

The Converse House and Barn are a historic residential property at 185 Washington Street in Norwich, Connecticut, built around 1870 for a local businessman and philanthropist. It is a prominent example of High Victorian Gothic architecture. The property was listed on the National Register of Historic Places in 1970, and is included in the Chelsea Parade Historic District.

== Description and history ==
The Converse House is located a short way south of Norwich's triangular Chelsea Parade park, on the east side of Washington Street opposite Norton Court. It is a 2 1/2-story wood-frame Gothic Revival structure, with asymmetrical massing, vertical board siding, and a polychrome exterior. The front facade is dominated by a hip-roofed tower on the right, in front of which is a distinctive seven-sided porch. Front-facing windows are set in peaked-gable openings, and there is decorative woodwork attached to the steep Gothic roof gables. The interior features fine oak flooring, walnut paneling in the dining room, and a fireplace surround with Dutch landscape in tile. The barn appears to be of similar age to the house, which was built around 1870.

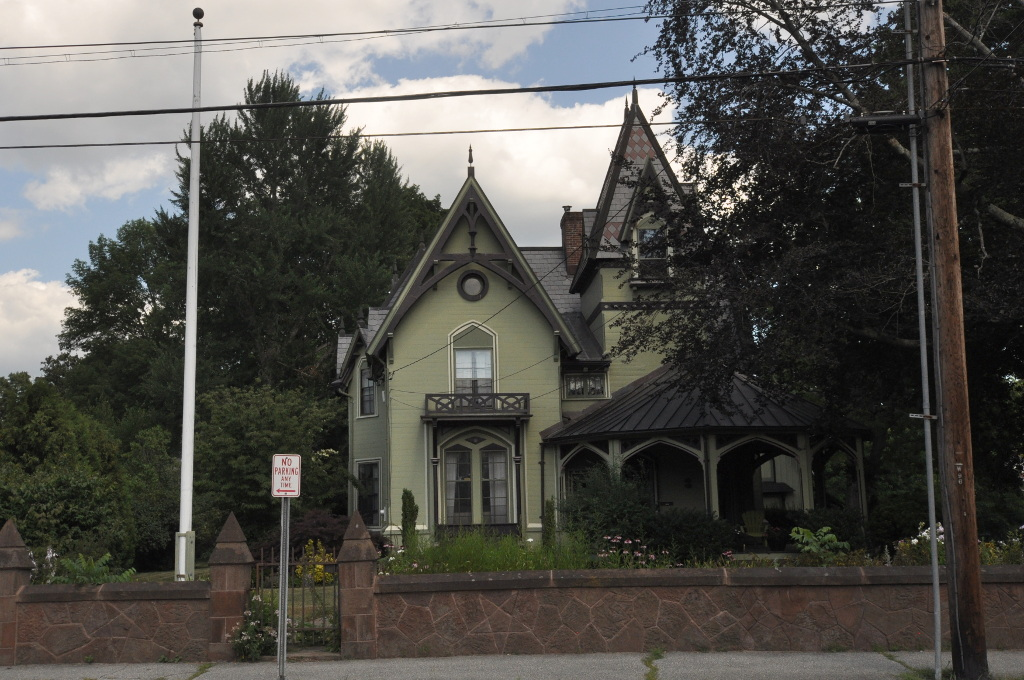
The Converse House in 2016

The house is a prominent example of the High Victorian Gothic style. It was the home of Colonel Charles A. Converse, a local businessman and philanthropist. Converse is best known locally for donating the Converse Art Gallery to the Norwich Free Academy.

== See also ==
- National Register of Historic Places listings in New London County, Connecticut
