= St. Thomas Episcopal Church (New Windsor, New York) =

Historic church in New York, United States

- U.S. National Register of Historic Places
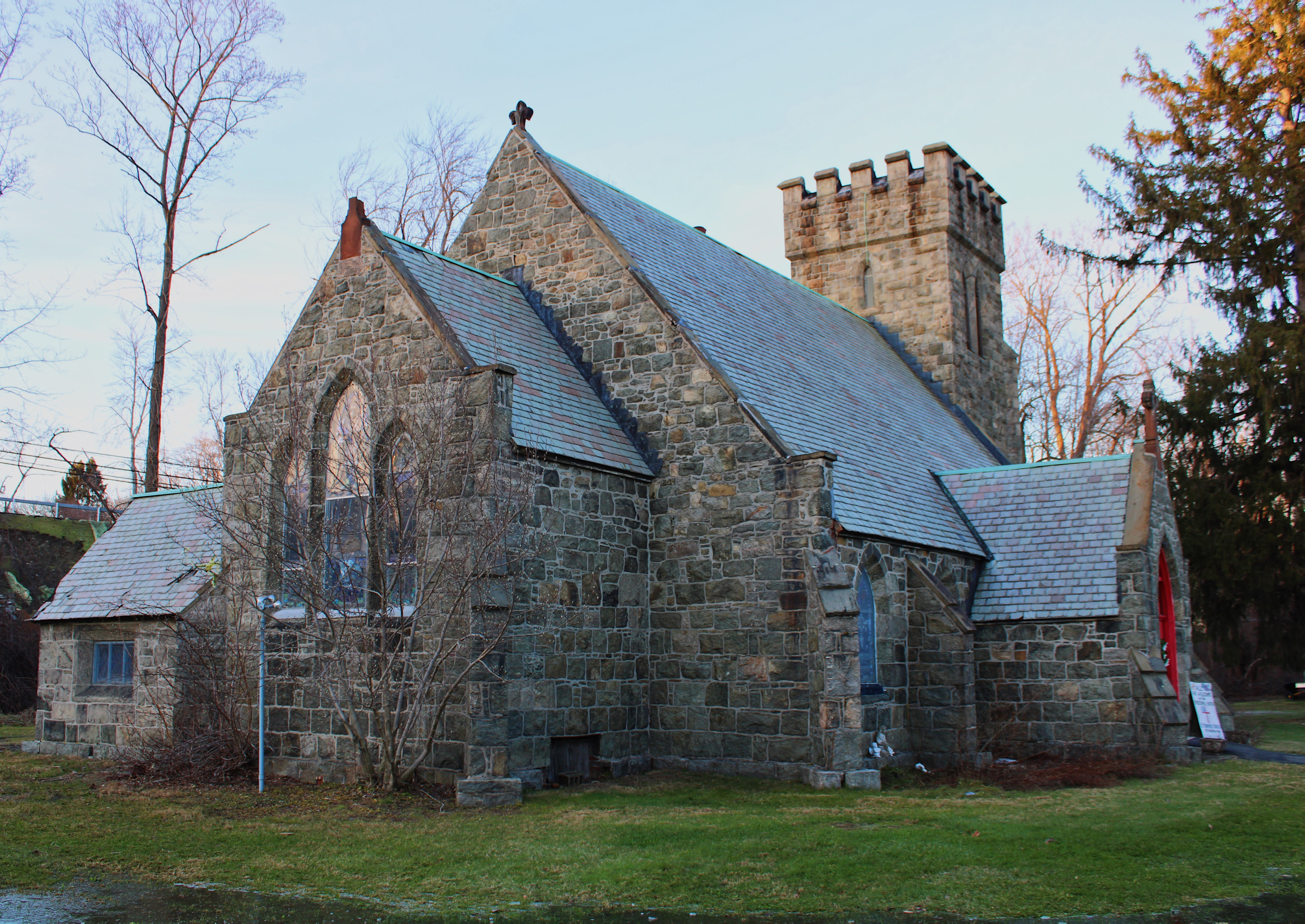
- Church in 2020
- Location: New Windsor, New York, United States
- Nearest city: Newburgh
- Coordinates: 41°28′14″N 74°01′03″W
- Built: 1846—1848
- Architect: Owen G. Warren
- Architectural style: Gothic Revival
- NRHP reference No.: 06000566
- Added to NRHP: July 12, 2006

St. Thomas Episcopal Church is located on River Road in New Windsor, New York, a short distance off US 9W. It is part of the Episcopal Diocese of New York. The small stone building was listed on the National Register of Historic Places in 2006.

== History ==
The congregation of St. Thomas Episcopal Church was organized about 1728, and initially met at Col. Thomas Ellison's store. The parish was established in 1818 and the first church building was erected on land bequeathed by Thomas Ellison. A rectory was built in 1859, but sold in 1864.

St. George's Episcopal Church in Newburgh developed from New Windsor's St. Thomas.

In 1845, the old church was destroyed by a fire, leaving the parishioners without a chapel for some time. When visiting his brother Charles, who had married an Ellison, the Rev. Dr. Henry J. Morton spoke with the family and told them of his involvement in the planning of St. James the Less Church in Philadelphia. When Morton had shared the plans with Thomas Ellison IV, he was so inspired that he drew up a subscription list for parishioners. They pledged money to build a new church, nearly two thousand dollars.

Ellison traveled to New York City and discussed Morton's sketches with architect Owen G. Warren, a director of the Mechanic's Institute of the City of New York. He previously practiced law, and was a drafter for Alexander Jackson Davis in 1845. Warren's first work of church architecture was the Church of the Annunciation on West 14th Street, which opened for services in August 1847. Construction of St. Thomas' began before the autumn of 1846, and the interior took longer than anticipated to finish. In December 1847, the church interior was still under construction, and A. J. Downing favored Warren's specifications for a newly-invented liquid wood stain that would give the beams a much older appearance. On September 14, 1848, the new church building was consecrated.

== Architecture ==
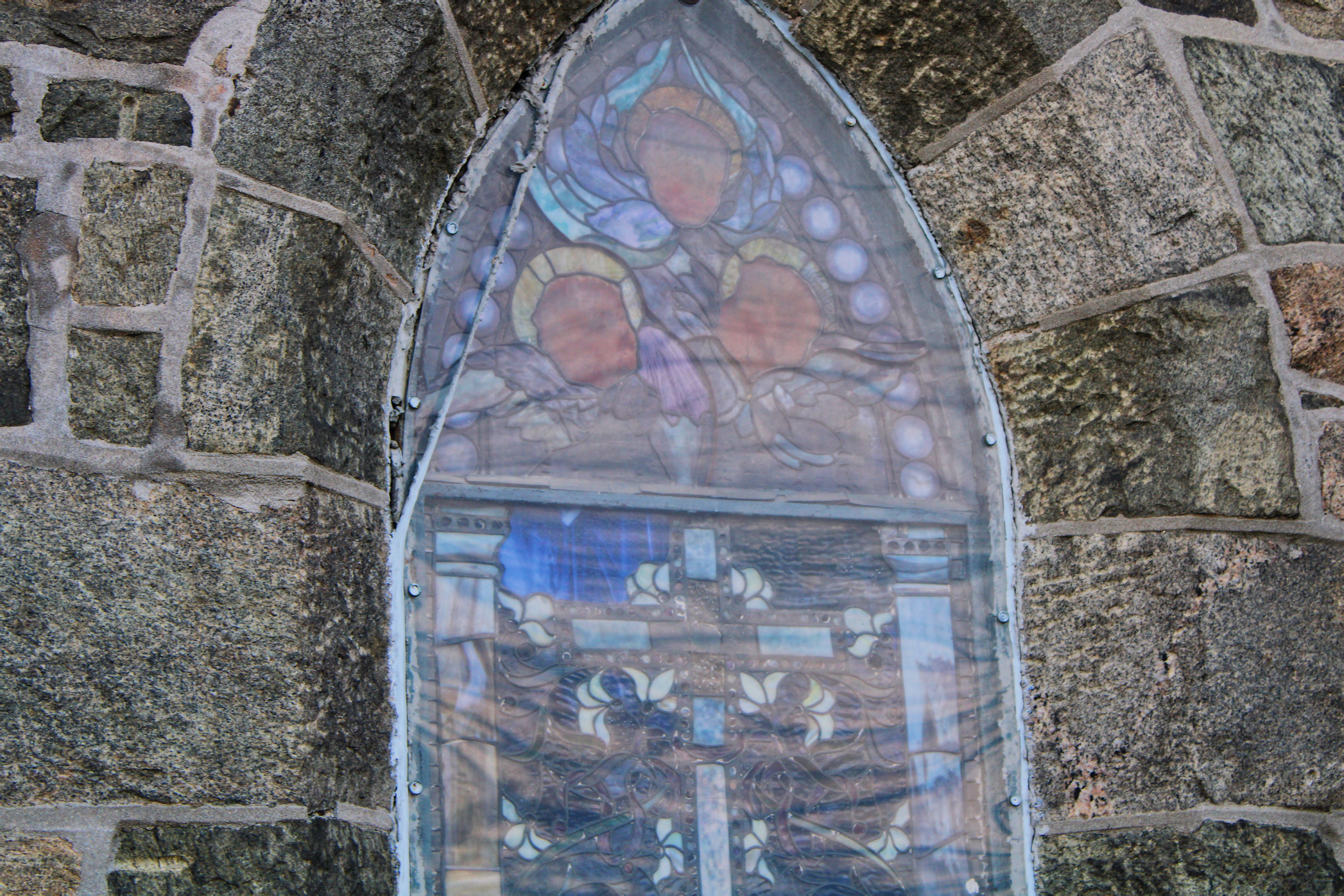
Window by D. Maitland Armstrong for the Chrystie family, members of the church

The plan for the church was based upon St. Michael's Church in Longstanton, Cambridgeshire, England, built in 1230. St. Thomas became known as the “first Medieval Gothic Church in the United States". Warren reduced the size of the church by about 2 feet, as St. Michael's measures 49' x 31' and St. Thomas' measures 47' x 33'. The chancels of both are 15 feet wide, but the deepness of St. Michael's, about 30', was reduced to about 15'.

The granite stone came from rock blasted out of nearby Breakneck Mountain to create the tunnel for the Hudson River Railroad.

A Tiffany Studios landscape window titled "Calvary" was added in 1906. Others windows are by D. Maitland Armstrong, a native of Newburgh and friend of the Chrystie family.

In 1914, artist Lee Woodward Zeigler completed a large altar mural, titled "Christ's Ascension". It depicts lifesize images of saints, marytrs and angels, crowded beneath a golden cross. Zeigler had married in the church five years prior and had a summer residence, Fanewood, less than a mile above the church.
