= Lee Woodward Zeigler =

American artist (1868–1952)

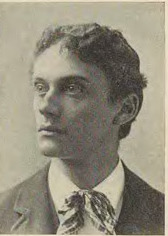
- Zeigler, c. 1896
- Born: Albert Lee Zeigler; May 7, 1868; Baltimore, Maryland, U.S.
- Died: June 16, 1952 (aged 84); New Windsor, New York, U.S.
- Resting place: St. George's Cemetery, Newburgh, New York, U.S.
- Education: Maryland Institute College of Art
- Years active: 1880s–1940s
- Spouse: Mary Stuart Roe Zeigler (m. 1909)
- Family: William James Roe (father-in-law)

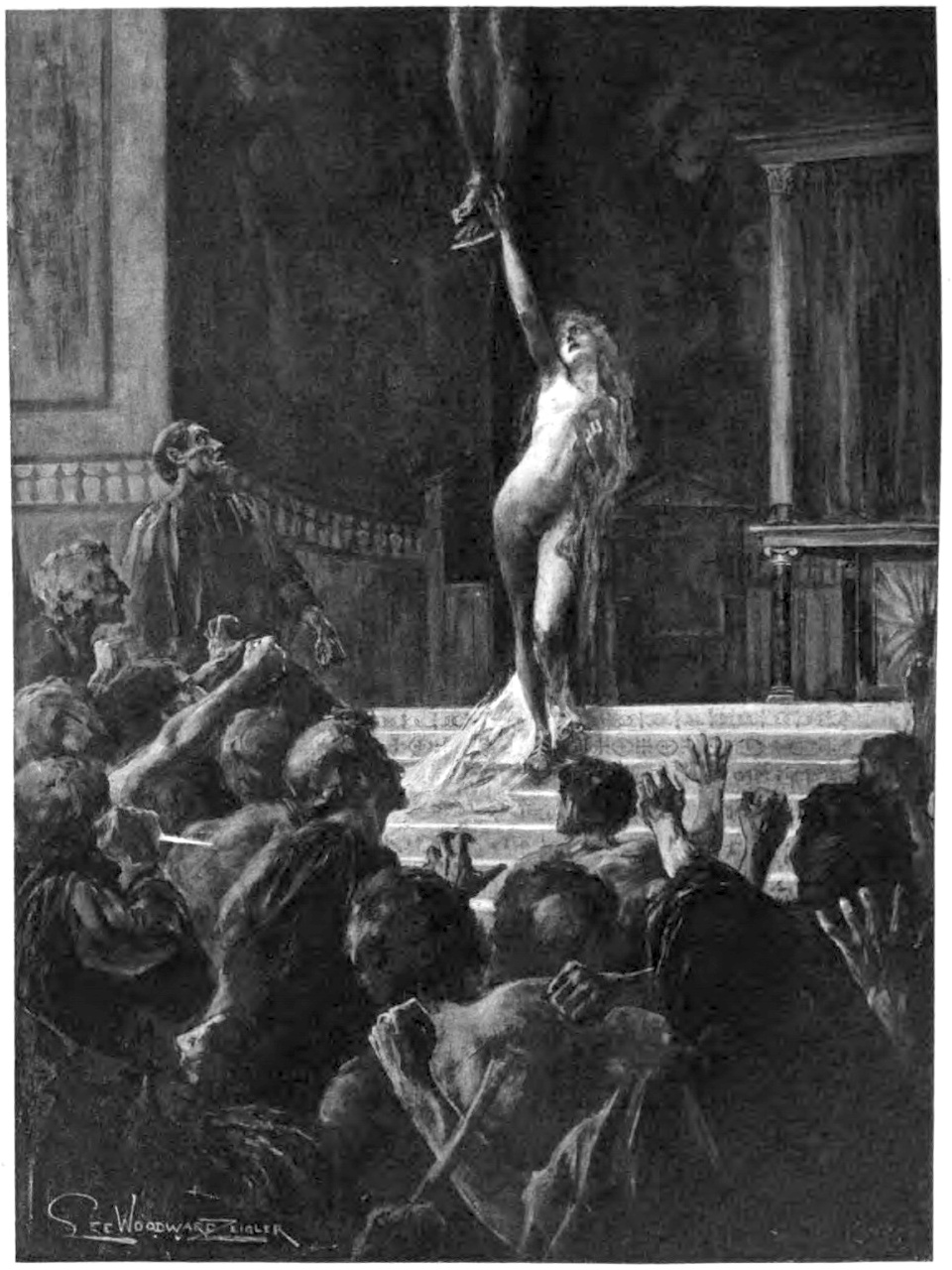
Hypatia by Charles Kingsley, Illustration by Lee Woodward Zeigler

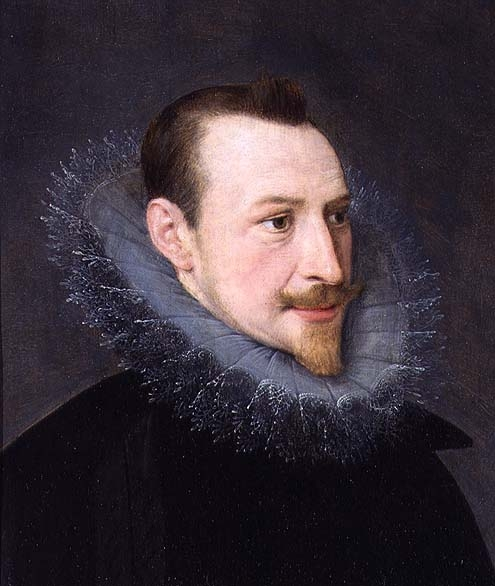
Zeigler was inspired by Elizabethan poet Edmund Spenser's work for most of his life

Lee Woodward Zeigler, also known as Albert Lee Zeigler, (May 7, 1868—June 16, 1952) was an American artist who began his career as an illustrator and later worked as a muralist.

== Early life and education ==
Born Albert Lee Zeigler, on May 7, 1868, in Baltimore, Maryland, to Daniel and Laura Zeigler. He attended Maryland Institute of Art (now known as Maryland Institute College of Art) and graduated in 1885. He was a founding member of the Charcoal Club of Baltimore, which met in a loft on Charles Street.

From 1889 to 1904, Zeigler illustrated for Life. From 1910 to 1918, Zeigler was the director of the Saint Paul Institute of Art and Science (which was later separated into two museums and is now the Minnesota Museum of American Art and Science Museum of Minnesota) in Saint Paul, Minnesota. Working in London, he also became a fellow in the Royal Society of Arts.

== Personal life ==
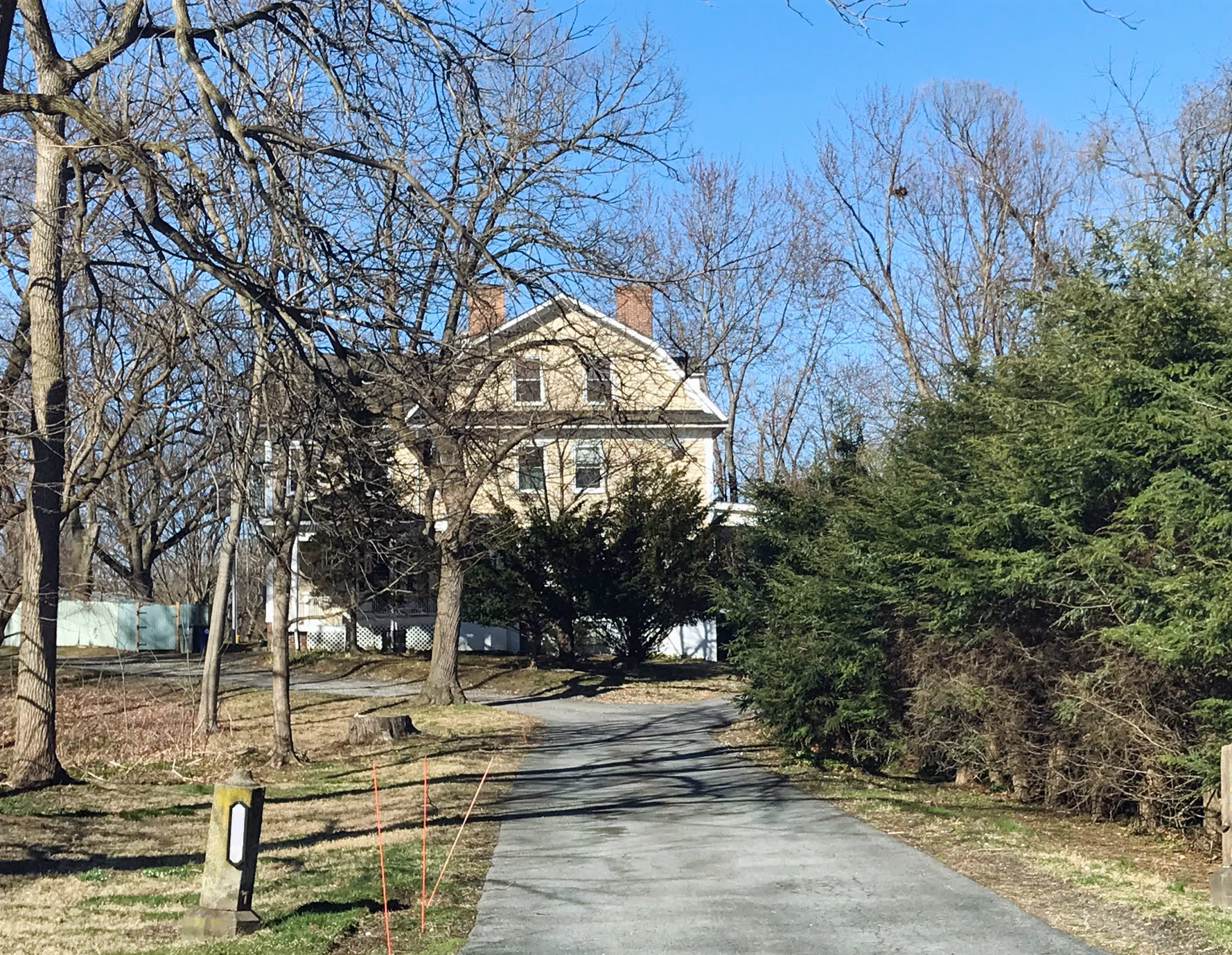
Fanewood in 2020, Zeigler's estate and studio.

On October 16, 1909, he married Mary Stuart (née Roe) Zeigler (1880–1963), the youngest daughter of author William James Roe. Their wedding was held at St. Thomas Episcopal Church and the reception held at his grandmother-in-law's estate. In 1914, he returned to the church to paint a mural titled Christ's Ascension near the altar, depicting martyrs, saints and angels below a golden cross.

== Work ==
Zeigler painted the mural Maryland (1925) at his alma mater Maryland Institute College of Art (MICA), in the court of the Main Building.

=== FERA murals ===
Zeigler worked for the Federal Emergency Relief Administration (FERA) and painted two murals c.1936 at the Stony Point Battlefield museum in Stony Point, New York, one of which features George Washington and Anthony Wayne planning their attack from nearby Buckberg Mountain.

During his time as a WPA muralist, Zeigler was commissioned to produce small murals at Newburgh Free Academy in 1936, which had opened for students in 1928. Though he was in disagreement with the Board of Education and Ralph Adams Cram over what the subject material should be, he ultimately decided that they should depict the drama and music, emulated by Renaissance figures. The two vertical murals flank the current stage; the auditorium renovation in 2010 preserved them.

=== The Faerie Queene murals ===
In 1929, when trustees of the Enoch Pratt Free Library began planning for a library building, Zeigler approached them with suggestions. For the second floor reading room, he proposed a set of murals depicting scenes from Edmund Spenser's The Faerie Queene. The murals were the realization of a lifelong dream. As a boy, his father had gifted him a copy of the poem for a birthday, and Zeigler had studied it ever since. When the library trustees saw Zeigler's tentative watercolor sketches of the murals, they allowed him to begin, granting him money for materials.

Work began around 1941 and finished in 1945, with help from his wife, Mary. The canvas panels for the mural were completed at Fanewood, and a skylight was installed to assist with lighting. At their completion, the Faerie Queene murals were the largest library murals ever completed in the United States, covering walls nearly 8 feet tall. The murals were unveiled in October 1945. Following a 2015 renovation to the Enoch Pratt Free Library, the murals were overpainted for restoration.

The Faerie Queene murals were motivated by Zeigler's life-long interest in the medieval and Renaissance periods, including their art and literature. Much of his illustrative work for children depicted scenes from fairy tales with older origins. He was a member of the Medieval Academy of America.

== Death and legacy ==
June 16, 1952, Zeigler died at Fanewood, his estate, the top floor of which he had used as a studio in his later years. He was 84 years old.

After his death, the estate was sold and converted into apartments. Development spurred in the area, and in the early 1950s, houses were built around the mansion. The street, Fanewood Drive in New Windsor, was named for it.

A collection of Zeigler's papers is held by the Archives of American Art at the Smithsonian Institution.
