= Wilson Potter =

American architect

Wilson Potter (died 1936) was a New York City-based architect. A number of his works are listed on the National Register of Historic Places.

His office was at 3 Union Square before moving to larger space at 22 East 17th Street in 1918.

Works include:

- Broad Street School (1897), 100 Broad Street, Norwich, Connecticut, NRHP-listed
- United Bank Building (1902–04), 19-21 Main St., New Milford, Connecticut, NRHP-listed
- Hall Memorial Library (1903), Ellington, Connecticut
- Bristol Public Library (1907), Bristol, Connecticut
- Washington School (1907), Ossining, New York, NRHP-listed
- South School (1915), 362 S. Main St., Torrington, Connecticut, NRHP-listed
- Uncasville School (1917-1918), 310 Norwich-New London Turnpike, in the Uncasville section of Montville, Connecticut, NRHP-listed
- Randall & Green Building, New Milford, Connecticut
- High school, Oneida, New York
- High school, Watertown, New York
