= Dennis W. Hickey =

- Born: September 20, 1844; Troy, New York
- Died: October 26, 1908 (aged 64)
- Burial place: Newburgh, New York
- Military career
- Allegiance: United States of America
- Branch: United States Army
- Rank: Sergeant
- Units: (New York (state)) Company E, 2nd New York Volunteer Cavalry Regiment
- Conflicts: American Civil War
- Awards: Medal of Honor

Dennis William Hickey (September 20, 1844 - October 26, 1908) was a Union Army soldier in the American Civil War who received the U.S. military's highest decoration, the Medal of Honor.

Hickey was born in Troy, New York on September 20, 1844. He was awarded the Medal of Honor, for extraordinary heroism shown on June 29, 1864, while serving as a Sergeant with Company E, 2nd New York Volunteer Cavalry Regiment, at Stony Creek Bridge, Virginia. His Medal of Honor was issued on April 18, 1891.

Hickey died at the age of 64, on and was buried at Saint Georges Cemetery in Newburgh, New York.

== Medal of Honor citation ==
The President of the United States of America, in the name of Congress, takes pleasure in presenting the Medal of Honor to Sergeant Dennis William Hickey, United States Army, for extraordinary heroism on 29 June 1864, while serving with Company E, 2d New York Cavalry, in action at Stony Creek Bridge, Virginia. With a detachment of three men, Sergeant Hickey tore up the bridge at Stony Creek being the last man on the bridge and covering the retreat until he was shot down.
