= James Walker Fowler House =

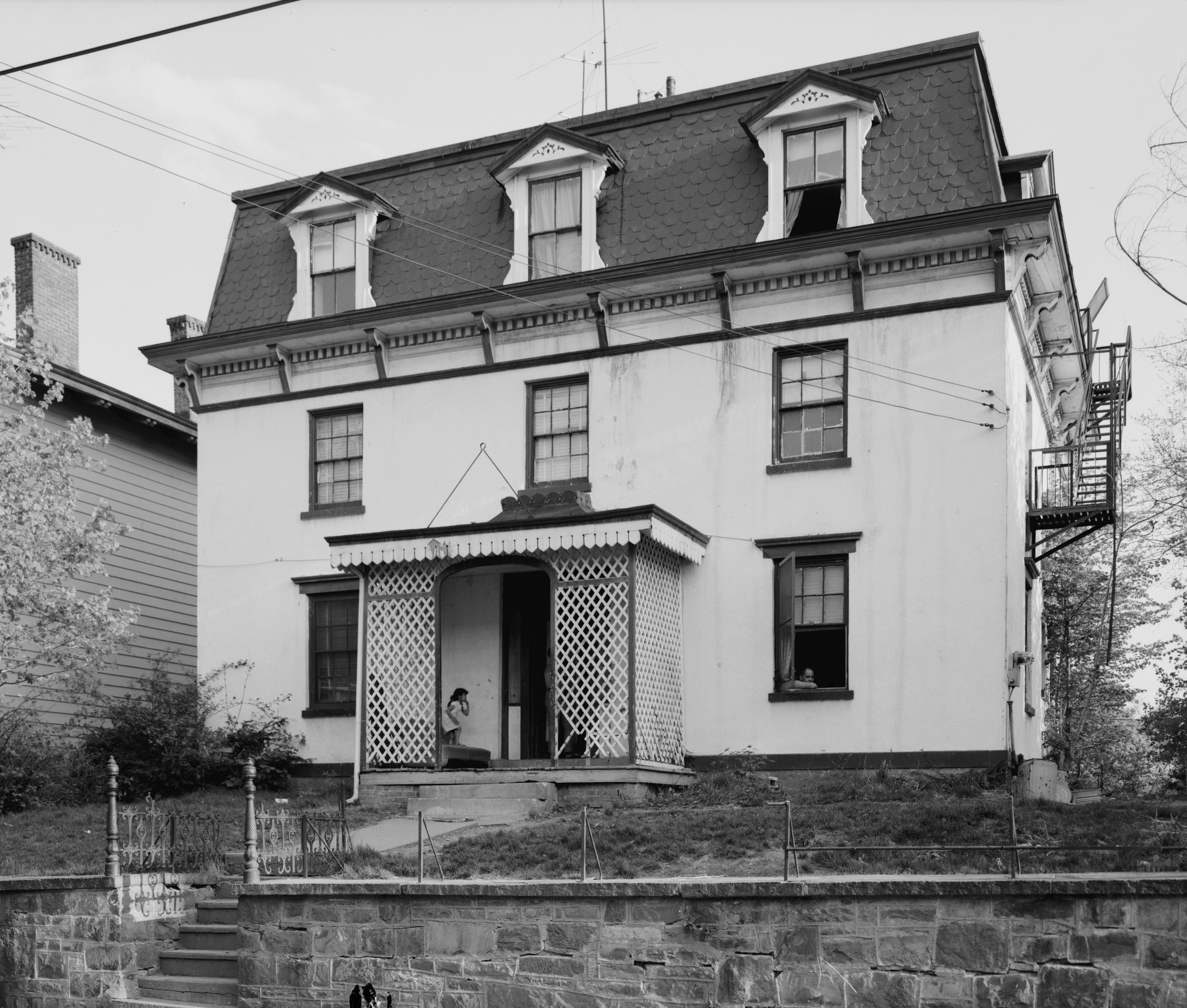
- The house in 1970
- Interactive map of the James Walker Fowler House area
- Alternative names: Captain Thomas S. Marvel House, Walker-Marvel House

General information
- Status: Demolished
- Type: Private residence, apartment building
- Architectural style: Second Empire
- Location: Newburgh, New York, 53 Ann Street, Newburgh, New York, United States
- Coordinates: 41.499067°N 74.010037°W
- Completed: c. 1845
- Demolished: After 1970

Technical details
- Floor count: 3
- Floor area: 32' x 32'

The James Walker Fowler House was a historic house in Newburgh, New York, occupied in the mid-19th century by Judge James Walker Fowler (1820–1905). After Fowler's death, the house passed through two owners before becoming the residence of Captain Thomas S. Marvel, a shipyard owner at the turn of the 20th century. In the 1970s, the house was demolished as part of the city's Urban Renewal efforts.

== Owners ==
=== Fowlers (1851—1861) ===
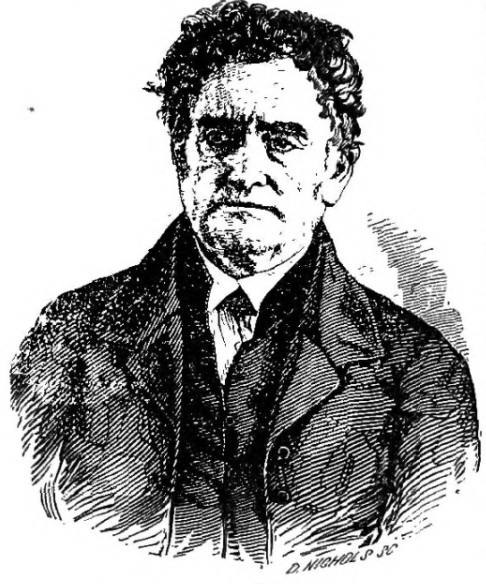
Gilbert Ogden Fowler

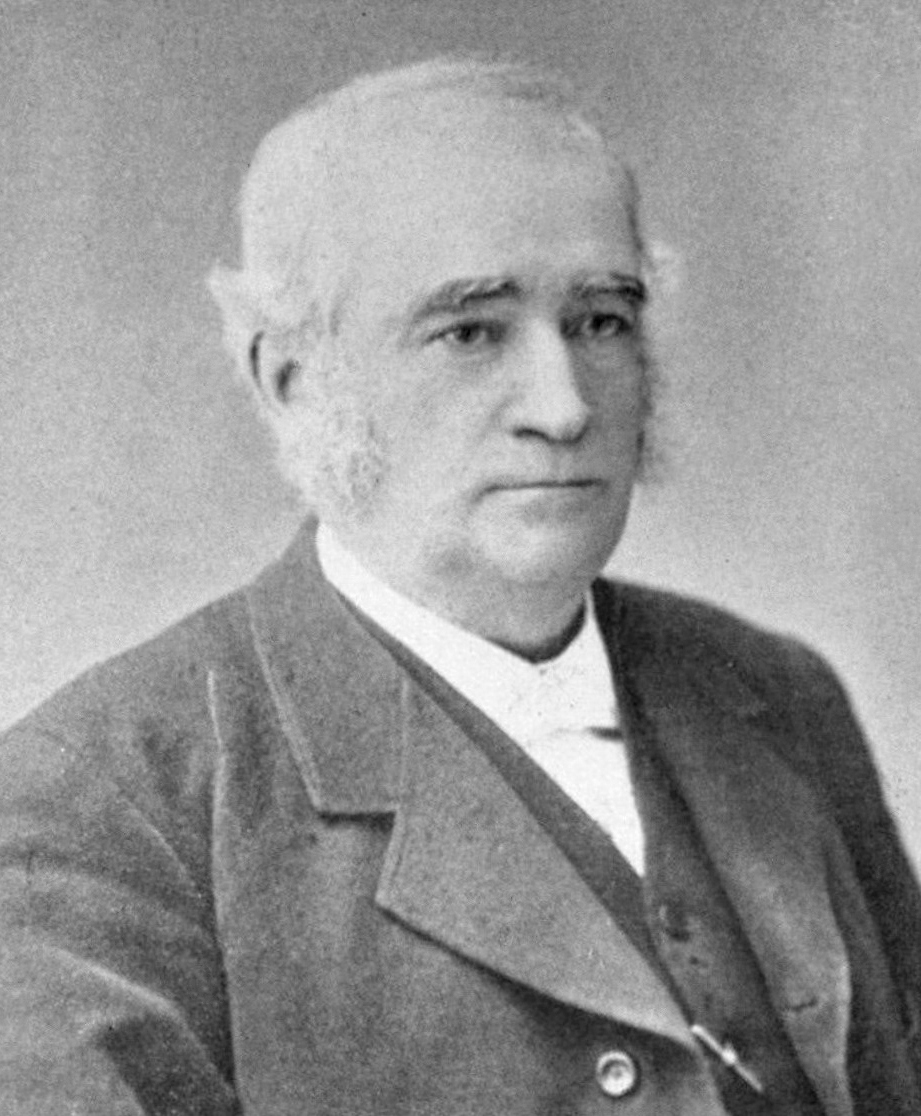
James Walker Fowler

Fowler was born on October 20, 1820, in New York City, the youngest son of Judge Gilbert Ogden Fowler (1788—1843) and Rachel Ann Walker Fowler (1794—1870). His grandfather, Dr. David Fowler, a former resident of Westchester, relocated to Middle Hope after the Revolution, then to Newburgh Village in 1828. The Fowler family were of English descent, originating at Islington, a borough of London. One of the first American Fowlers, thought to be William Fowler, arrived in 1637, and according to legend became the first magistrate of New Haven. His descendants came to Long Island, then further inland to Rye.

Gilbert Ogden Fowler became heavily involved with Newburgh business and law during the early 19th century, contributing to the village's growth. Licensed to practice law in 1810, he served as Master in Chancery, Judge of Orange County Pleas, and in the County Legislature. While a legislator, he influenced passage of charters for the Highland Bank and a new railroad. Once the bank had been established, he took office as its president until 1843. Fowler also served as a major general in the local brigade, leading some to recall him as "General Fowler."

The family homestead built by Dr. David Fowler stood near the corner of Liberty and Campbell Streets until 1930. His grandson spent his adolescence in the house, moving in at four years old with his parents. He studied law at Columbia, as his father had done, then apprenticed with Newburgh judge John W. Brown. Preparing for admittance to the bar, he married Mary Francis Brown in 1842, entering the practice as his father died. The family belonged to St. George's Episcopal Church on Grand Street, the men serving in the vestry. James and Mary had one son, Frederick Culbert Fowler (1849–1870).

Remaining in Newburgh, a city of many prominent lawyers, he began to work at the firm of Hon. William Fullerton. In 1851, Fowler became surrogate judge for Orange County. After serving for about a decade, in 1861 he sold the house to Gilbert Millspaugh, and moved to New York City. After several business failures in the city and South Dakota, he eventually returned to Newburgh, living at the family homestead. On June 9, 1905, he fell down a flight of stairs in his old age and died. The Historical Society of Newburgh Bay and the Highlands included his obituary in the publication of their annual historical papers because Fowler was a late member.

==== Unused Vaux & Withers Plan ====
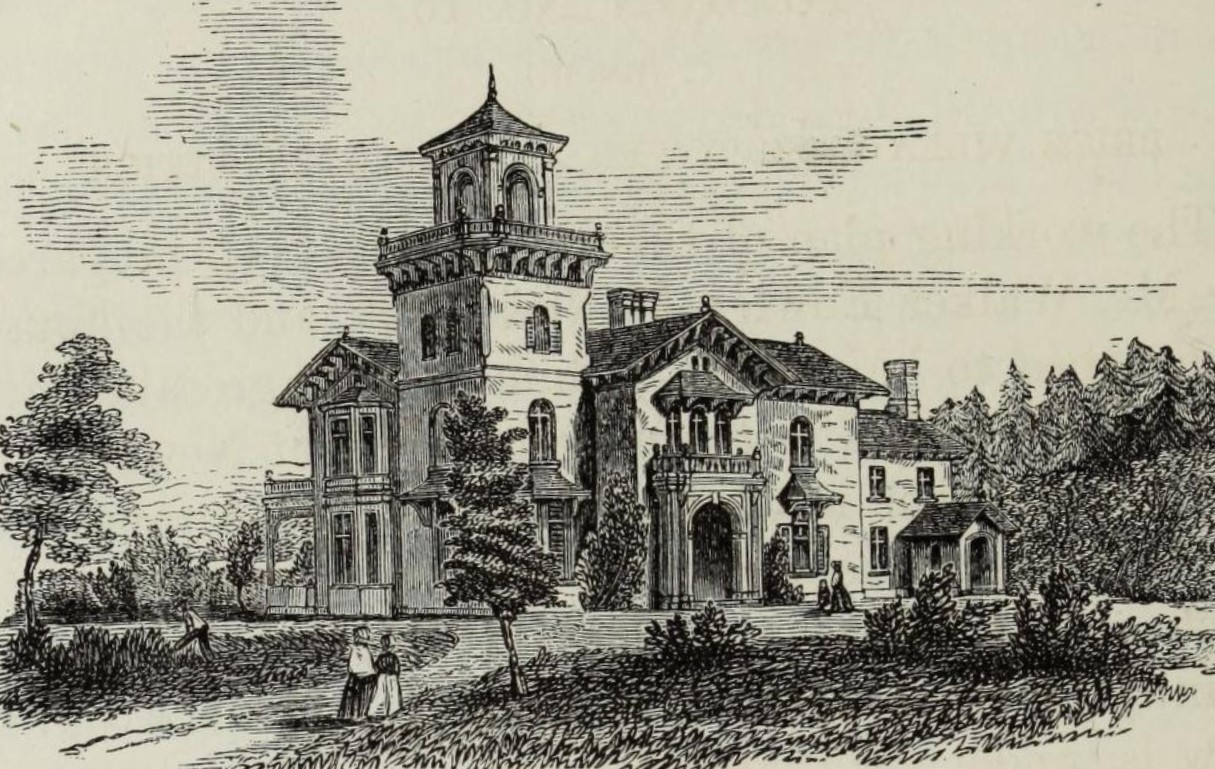
Design No. 15, Walker Fowler House

Fowler originally contacted Calvert Vaux and Frederick Clarke Withers for architectural plans, and wanted a brick villa with a four-story observation tower overlooking the Hudson. Vaux called the neighborhood Limestone Hill, "well adapted for a country seat" being "a ridge of limestone two miles northwest of the city of Newburgh," currently behind the parking lot of Newburgh Free Academy. This location does not describe the area Fowler ultimately chose to build the house. The Fowler site would have dominated a hill, its verandah positioned on a bluff with a drive leading from the back, characteristic of such designs. At the spot, a "mammoth boulder, that looks like a sleeping monster, some twenty or thirty feet long, has been split in a peculiar manner by a tree growing into a fissure behind it, and thus presents a curious appearance."

=== Garrisons (1865—1892) ===
Dr. Issac Garrison (1799—1882) and his third wife, Catherine Amelia Scott (1825—1897), moved into the house after Gilbert Millspaugh. Garrison began life as a farmer in Plattekill, working with his father, but as he became enrolled in school at Sing Sing, took interest in medicine. He began to plan his career in Newburgh, graduating from Vermont Medical College in 1823. Before leaving New York, Garrison studied with Dr. Charles Miller, who ran a fruitful practice. As he began to decline in health, Miller asked for Garrison's assistance. At his passing, Garrison took control of the business, married Miller's sister Matilda, and became a sought-after physician.

Garrison spent much time away from the city after his first marriage, and owned a farm in Monroe County. He finally returned in 1865, purchasing the house, where he lived until his death in 1882. Catherine and the couple's son, Charles Mabel, relocated to Salt Lake City. They sold the house to Captain Thomas Marvel.

=== Marvels (1892—1918) ===
==== Marvel Shipyards ====
At his purchase of the house, Captain Thomas Stahl Marvel and his wife Hattie Burns had four children and managed the thriving Marvel Shipyards. The site occupies the current Newburgh People's Park at the foot of Washington Street, and has been a vacant grassy lot since the removal of a scrapyard.

Marvel's father, Thomas S. Marvel, was born in Newport, Rhode Island in 1808. He entered the shipbuilding industry as a boy, apprenticing with shipwright Isaac Webb in New York. Marvel moved upriver to the bustling shipping village of Newburgh around 1836 to begin a lucrative yet small shipbuilding company. Mainly constructing sloops, small wooden sailing vessels, and schooners, Marvel operated near the foot of Ann Street. The yard's second location was Norris's Dock at the foot of Renwick Street, nearer to the location Marvel's son would begin his own company. This provided a marine railway for easy receiving of goods and materials.

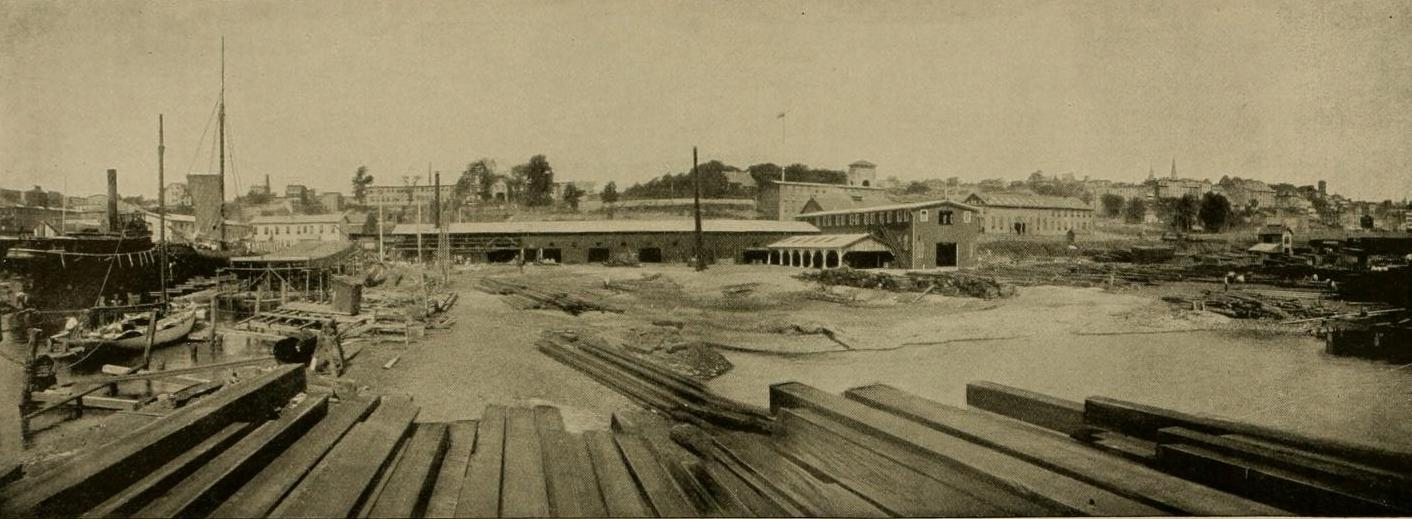
Thomas S. Marvel Shipyards at the city's southern docks, 1890. Note Washington's Headquarters in the background just off center towards the right.

In the spring of 1847, a sloop commissioned by Hiram Travis of Peekskill launched from Newburgh. For many years it served as a merchant sailing vessel, named the Thomas S. Marvel, presumably for its high craftsmanship. The yard's second notable vessel, 160 feet in length, reached completion in 1853, thought to be Marvel's first steamboat. It ran on a Wolff engine, which used a more efficient high-and-low pressure steam operating system.

Thomas S. Marvel II, born 1834 in New York, joined his father in 1847 at 13 years old. Following the success of the first steamboat, one of Marvel's first projects involved building a new steamboat hull to prove himself. His finished product, the Mohawk Chief, weighed about 85 tons, with a length of 86 feet. Assured with his son's progress the elder Marvel retired in 1860, but may have afterwards commanded sailing vessels on the Hudson. Father and son frequently prefixed their names with "Captain." Marvel I died in 1871.

At age 21, Marvel began his own business by taking ownership of his father's yard. He recruited George F. Riley, another shipwright, to assist him, but the partnership broke off as Marvel went to enlist in the Union Army in April 1861. For a brief time, Marvel served as Captain of Company A in the 56th New York Volunteers. He returned due to illness in 1862, but focused on minor shipbuilding efforts at Port Richmond, Staten Island, and in Denton, Maryland. During this time, he married Hattie Burns, of Monroe, and the couple had a son, Harry, in 1865 on Staten Island.

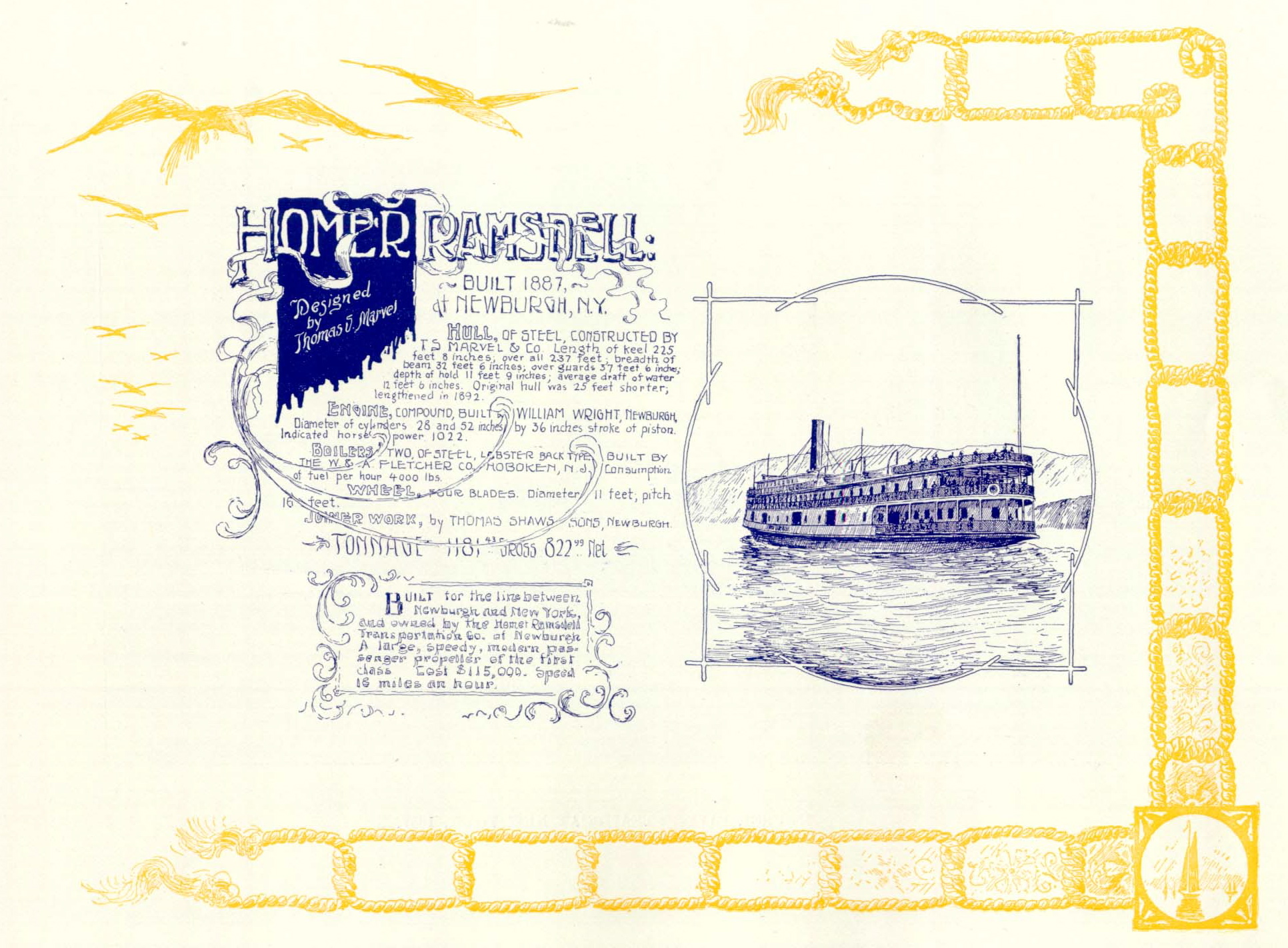
Homer Ramsdell, designed by Thomas S. Marvel

In the 1870s, Ward, Stanton & Co., formerly Newburgh manufacturers of iron, entered shipbuilding, which continued to expand on the waterfront even as brick making began to rise. John Delany, an immigrant from Kilkenny, Ireland, formed a partnership with Samuel Stanton, superintendent of Washington Iron Works, and Luther C. Ward, a manager, in 1872. Their first location was a dock and large brick building on the east side of South Water Street. In 1877, the persuaded Marvel to join their firm and manage their new yards, to which he obliged. With subsequent enlargement, the company hired 300 men to construct wooden and iron steam vessels, ferry-boats, engines, boilers and towing propellers. The works crumbled after a ruinous fire in 1882. Two years later, Marvel joined Delany in formation of the Thomas S. Marvel Shipyards.

The new shipyards set out to build first-class vessels, and equipped to do so with a workspace of 300 feet long, 400 feet deep. In 1888, about 200 men worked at the yards, which repaired just as many ships as it built new ones. As Harry Marvel came of age, he began to work in the shipyards, and by 1908 served as a superintendent, arguably company's climax. Delaney left in 1904, at which point the name changed to Thomas S. Marvel Shipbuilding Company, and later the Harry A. Marvel & Co. Shipbuilding Company.

=== Huguenot Fowlers (1918—1950) ===
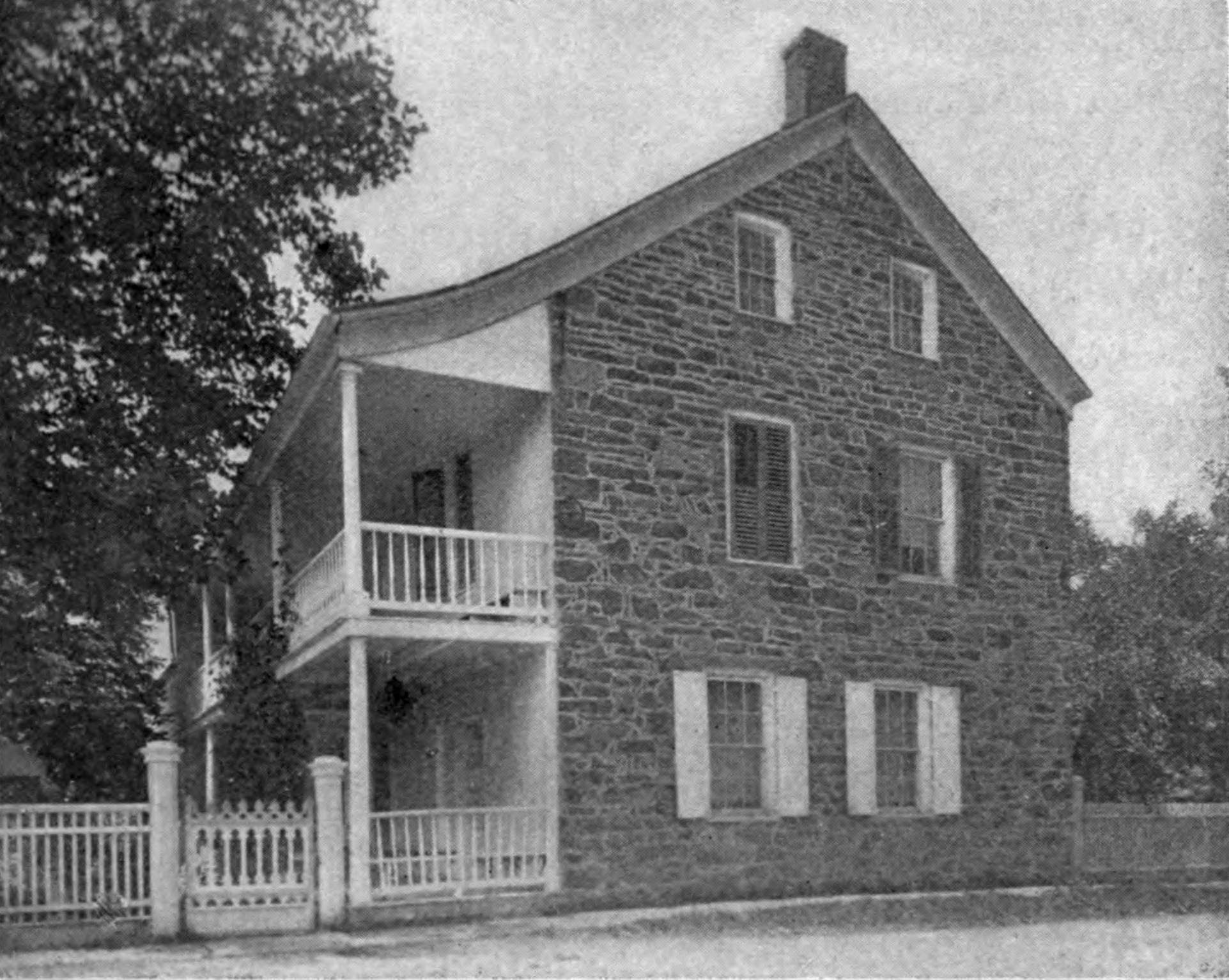
DuBois Fort, New Paltz

About two generations of Marvels remained in the house until a Jane or Jennie Marvel sold it in 1918 to the Fowlers, relation to James Walker unknown. Grace Lefevre Fowler and her husband Abram DuBois Fowler were likely descendants of the Huguenots at New Paltz; many Huguenots, primarily of the Hasbrouck and Deyo families, moved to Newburgh, New Hurley, and Kingston in the 18th and 19th centuries. The Fowlers also worshipped at the Dutch Reformed Church, common with Huguenots; some attended the Old Dutch Church for many generations. The house sold to a "Mr. Deegan" after the death of Grace. After 1950, the house became an apartment building.

=== Apartment Building (1950—1970) ===
When the Historic American Buildings Survey began documentation in Newburgh, 53 Ann Street was somehow selected. It is one of the only houses in the survey that did not survive Urban Renewal. Grace and Abram's son, Robert, could have initiated the commission. Fowler, former principal of Newburgh Free Academy and active community member, assisted greatly in the survey. He received co-authorship, likely from knowledge his parents had received upon their purchase of the house.

== Description ==
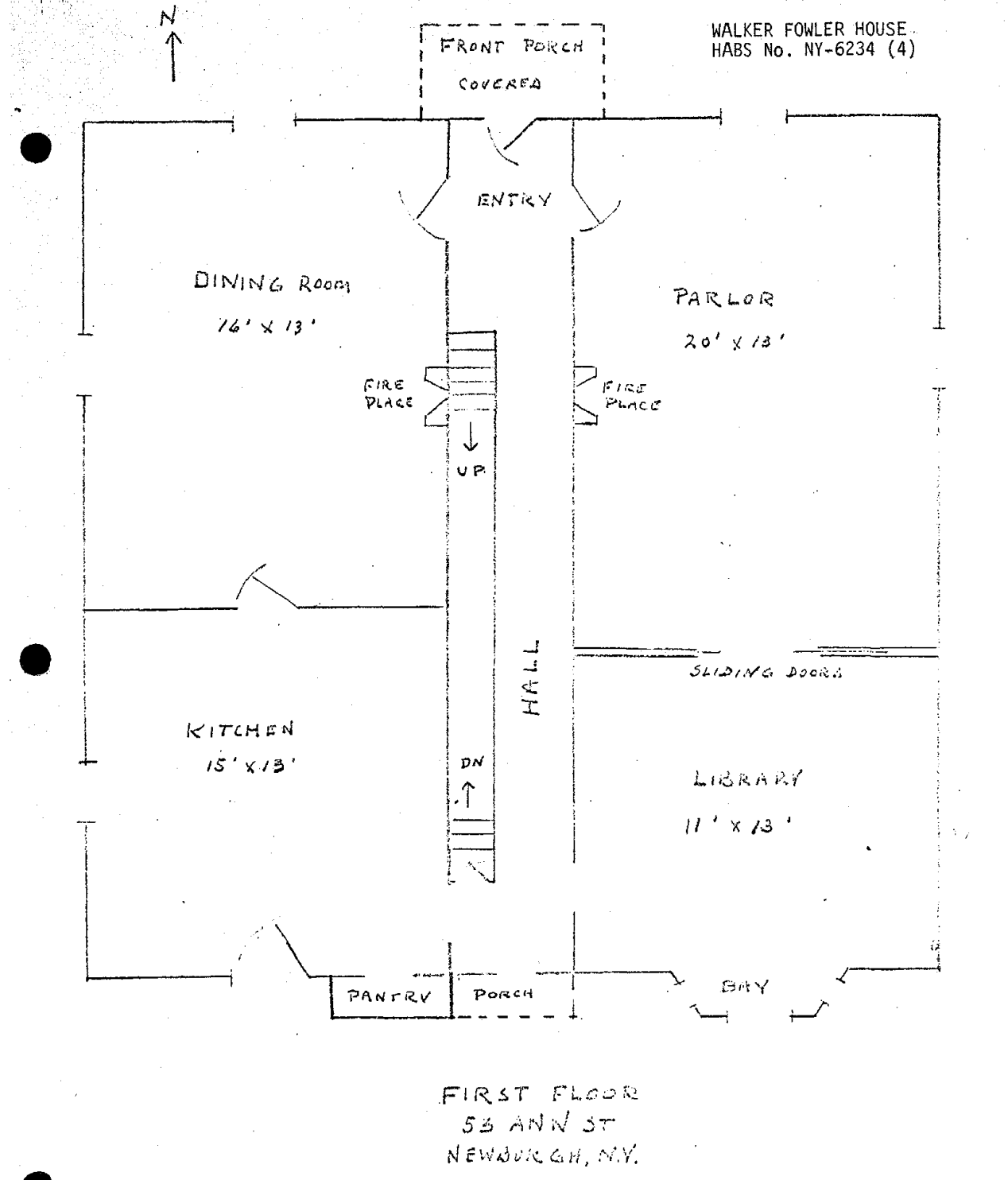
A sketch of the first floor, likely the work of Robert DuBois Fowler

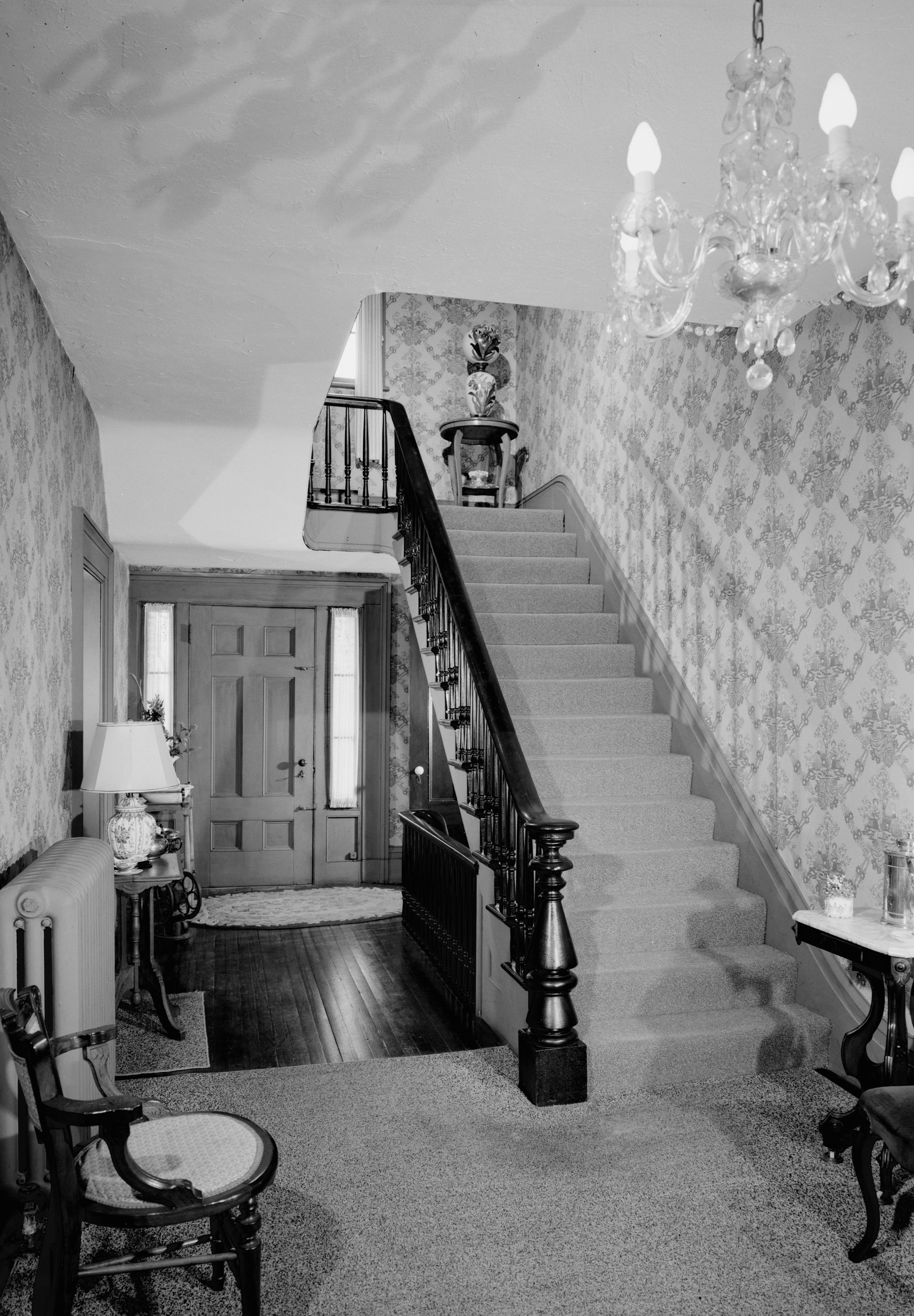
Stair Hall

=== Exterior ===
The house was three stories with a full basement, the top floor consisting of a striking Mansard roof, thought to be a later addition. The foundations of stone and mortar carried out to the front retaining wall, decorated with an ornate iron work railing. Much of it has been stripped off in the 1970 photograph. A house with very similar ironwork survives on the corner of Ann and Grand Streets, near the site of the James Walker Fowler House. The retaining wall had flagstone pieces, with a middle walkway leading up to the front porch, decorated with lattice. On the property today sits the Newburgh Police Precinct, but the house originally had a large backyard with stables.

=== Interior ===
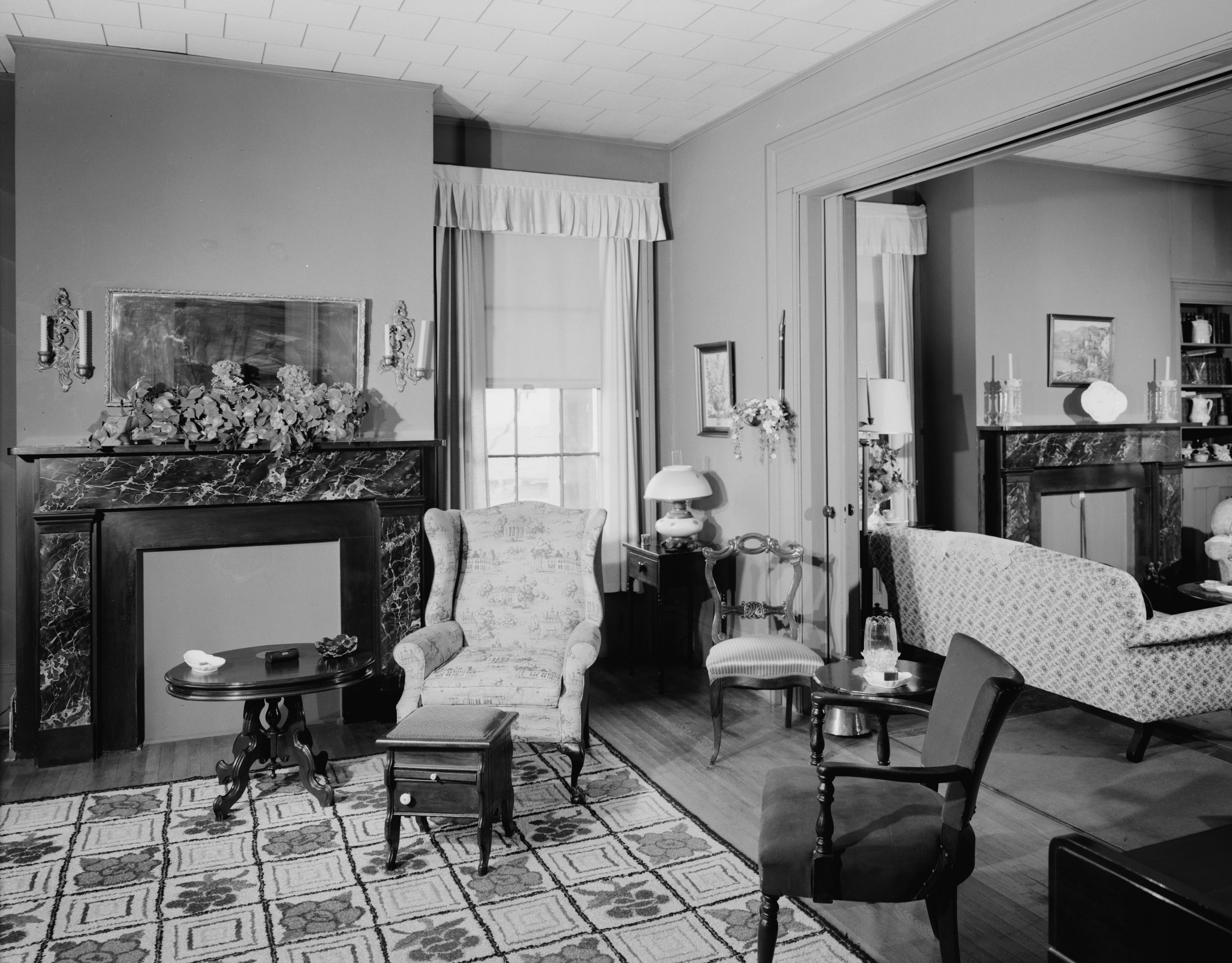
Double Parlor

The first floor had a long stair hall, leading to the back porch and into a dining room, parlor, and library. A double parlor holding the latter two rooms made up the house's east side, while the west side had a dining room and kitchen. The original kitchen may have been in the basement, with stairs held at the back of the house, and a possible added pantry beside the porch.

The stair newel post is typical of the 1850s, but details such as the electric chandelier and heater are obviously later additions. In the photograph, the camera faces south, and the porch door is visible. From under the carpet, the thin oak flooring is visible.

The second and third floors are divided in a similar manner, with all the rooms listed as bedrooms. A 6 foot by 6 foot room above the front porch is called a bathroom in both floor plans.

Fowler claims the fireplaces were sealed in 1918.

== Cited sources ==
- The Empire State: Its Industries and Wealth : Also an Historical and Descriptive Review of the Industries and Wealth of the Principal Cities and Towns in Albany, Rensselaer, Saratoga, Schenectady, Columbus, Ulster, Dutchess, Orange, and Westchester Counties. American Publishing and Engraving Company. 1888.
- Blume, Kenneth J. (2012). Historical Dictionary of the U.S. Maritime Industry. Scarecrow Press. ISBN 978-0-8108-5634-9.
- Fowler, Robert. Eleni Silverman (ed.). Historic American Buildings Survey: 53 Ann Street, Newburgh, NY: James Walker Fowler House (PDF). National Park Service.
- Hall, William K. (1905). Historical Papers. Historical Society of Newburgh Bay and the Highlands.
- Headley, Russel (1908). The History of Orange County, New York. Van Deusen and Elms.
- Kowsky, Francis R. (2003). Country, Park & City: The Architecture and Life of Calvert Vaux. Oxford University Press. ISBN 978-0-19-517113-6.
- "Funeral services for Mrs. Grace Lefevre Fowler". The Newburgh News. May 29, 1950. p. 15.
- Ruttenber, Edward Manning (1859). History of the Town of Newburgh. Newburgh, NY: E. M. Ruttenber & Co.
- Ruttenber, Edward Manning and Clark, Lewis (1881). History of Orange County, New York. Everts & Peck.
- Thomas, William duBarry (2000). Newburgh's Shipbuilding Heritage in the Days of Wooden Ships & Sail (PDF). Kingston, NY: Hudson River Maritime Museum.
- Vaux, Calvert (1874). Villas and Cottages. New York, NY: Harper & Brothers.
