= Halsey Stevens House =

- U.S. Historic district – Contributing property
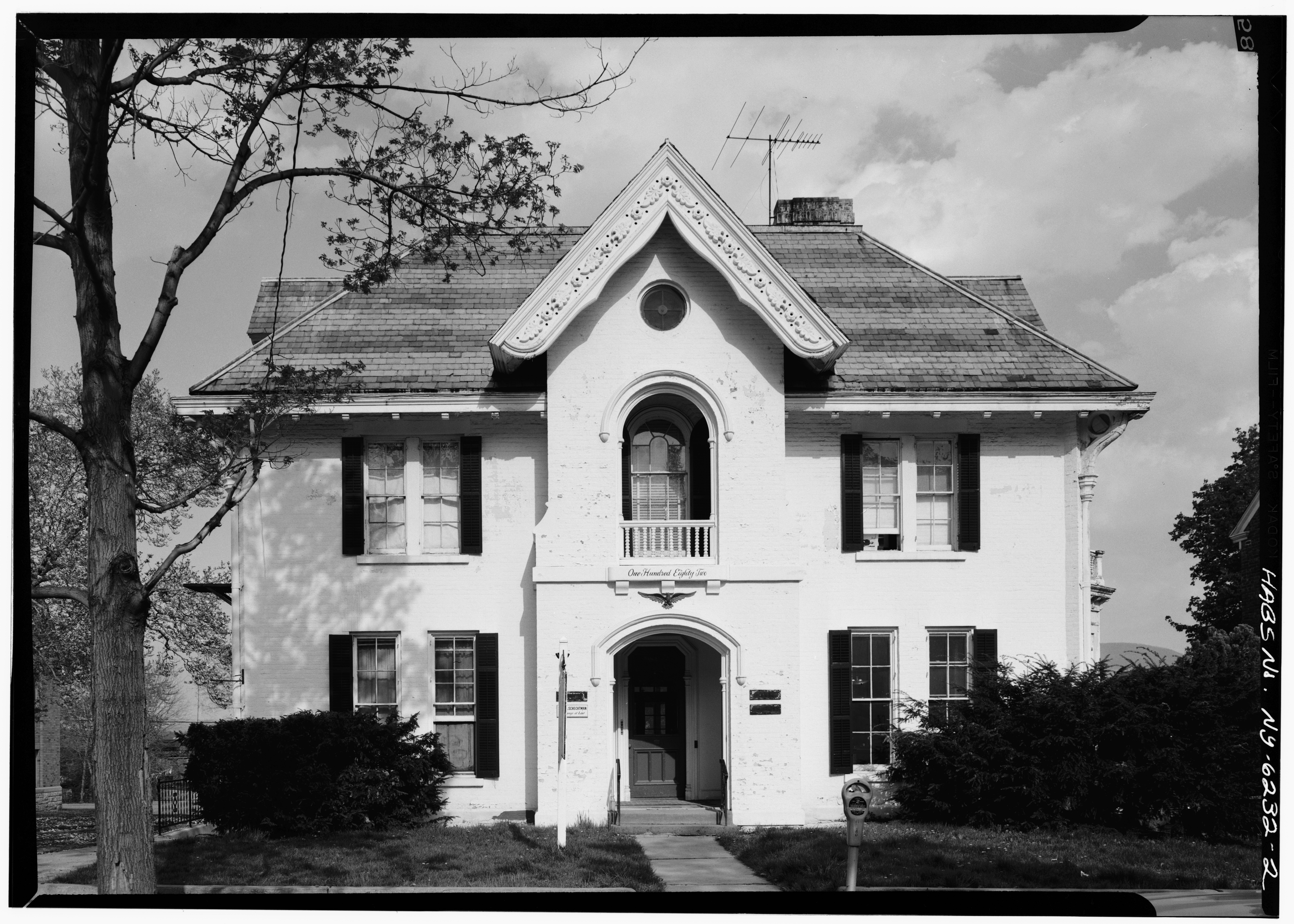
- The house in 1970

- Location within New York Location within the United States
- Location: 182 Grand St., Newburgh, New York
- Coordinates: 41°30′21″N 74°0′32″W
- Built: 1855
- Architect: Calvert Vaux, Frederick Clarke Withers
- Architectural style: Gothic Revival
- Part of: Montgomery-Grand-Liberty Streets Historic District

Significant dates
- Added to NRHP: September 27, 1972
- Designated CP: July 16, 1973

The Halsey Stevens House is a historic house located at 182 Grand Street in Newburgh, New York. It is one of the first residences designed by the architects Calvert Vaux and Frederick Clarke Withers after the death of their mentor Andrew Jackson Downing the previous year. Listed as part of the Montgomery—Grand—Liberty Streets Historic District in Newburgh, the house has been well-preserved and demonstrates how both worked with Gothic Revival and Italianate styles. Halsey R. Stevens, their client, was a lumber dealer and Biblical scholar.

== Significance ==
Halsey R. Stevens was born in Enfield, New Hampshire and as a teenager worked as a local schoolteacher. He relocated to the vicinity of Dartmouth College and as a philomath became interested in its literary societies and academic culture. In 1851, after serving as a community-oriented leader in Lebanon, he arrived in Newburgh to join in the lumber trade. He did business with David Moore, who had commissioned Downing & Vaux to design him a house in 1851 on Broad Street. Through this connection, Stevens approached Vaux & Withers to design his own residence near Moore's.

Vaux included the design in his book Villas and Cottages (1857) as Design No. 10, "Suburban House with Attics," and specified it had been a collaboration with Withers. Most unique about the house is its "recessed porch," which Vaux believed "materially helps to relieve what would otherwise be a monotonous front." He meant for the upper balcony to be enclosed by glazing in the winter. Mainly for the development of the porch, which carries a semi-Palladian air in its oculus window, the house has been regarded as noteworthy in antebellum Italian-inspired architecture.

Withers went on to use the house's street-facing elevation in his Eugene Brewster House (1865) further down the street and his President's House for Gallaudet University later in the 1860s.
