= Eugene A. Brewster House =

- U.S. Historic district – Contributing property
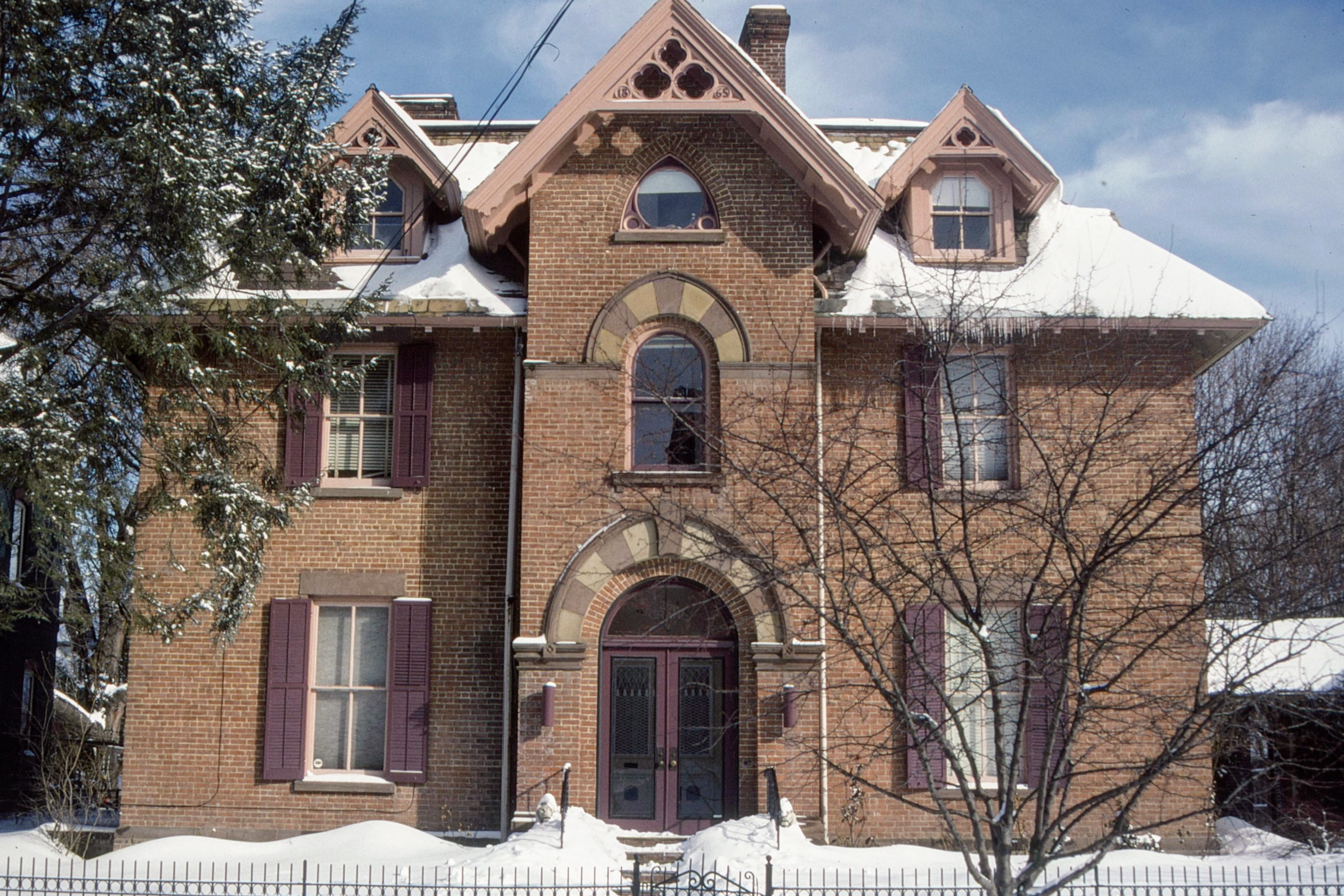
- The house in the 1970s

- Location within New York Location within the United States
- Location: 264 Grand St., Newburgh, New York
- Coordinates: 41°30′31.5″N 74°0′32″W
- Built: 1865
- Built by: John Little
- Architect: Frederick Clarke Withers
- Architectural style: High Victorian Gothic
- Part of: Montgomery-Grand-Liberty Streets Historic District

Significant dates
- Added to NRHP: September 27, 1972
- Designated CP: July 16, 1973

The Eugene A. Brewster House is a historic house located at 264 Grand Street in Newburgh, New York. Built in 1865, the year Newburgh incorporated as a city, it was designed by English immigrant architect Frederick Clarke Withers for attorney Eugene Augustus Brewster. It is the last residence Withers designed in Newburgh, where he began his career as a practicing architect in the mid-1850s.

== Description and history ==
The house is three-story, hipped roof brick structure broken by a gabled central projection, a massing copied from the Halsey Stevens House (1855) by Withers and Calvert Vaux of a decade prior. Similar to the Stevens house's fenestration, Withers used rectangular windows slightly smaller on the second floor and rounded openings in the projection. Canted dormers—a technique of his former partner Vaux—complete the bays flanking the main entrance. The center gable and dormers have saw-cut quatrefoil panels and carved barge rafters with similar ends to those found beneath the slated hipped roof. Around the rounded arch door and above second floor window are bichromatic bands of stone forming Florentine arches connected with brownstone impost moldings. This High Victorian Gothic trait distinguishes the house from Withers's earlier Stevens project, expressing his interest in John Ruskin and architectural trends in England.

Brewster and his wife Anna were transferred the property 16 February 1865 by Fanny C. Crawford, who began selling off the pasture surrounding her house in the 1860s. Construction began soon after, and probably finished by year's end or in early 1866. John Little was the mason.

Eugene A. Brewster (1827–1898) was born in New York City to Timothy and Juliet Brewster. His grandfather, Samuel Brewster, was a patriot, blacksmith, and enslaver in New Windsor, New York, famed for forging part of the Great Chain during the Revolutionary War. The family relocated to the area in 1831, Timothy Brewster investing in a lumber yard at Water and Fourth Streets in Newburgh.

Brewster as a young man entered the law office of the Hon. John W. Brown, a fierce Scottish American judge in Newburgh. He became licensed In 1848, and between 1850–55 worked as Nathan Reeve's partner. In 1859 he married Anna Wilhelmina Brown (1836–1915), daughter of Francis E. Ludlow and the Episcopal minister John Brown of St. George's Episcopal Church in Newburgh. The couple had four children: Francis Elizabeth Brewster (1862–1865), Eugene Brewster, jr. (1866–1892), George Richard Brewster (1873–1936), and Anna Wilhelmina Brewster (1875–1966).

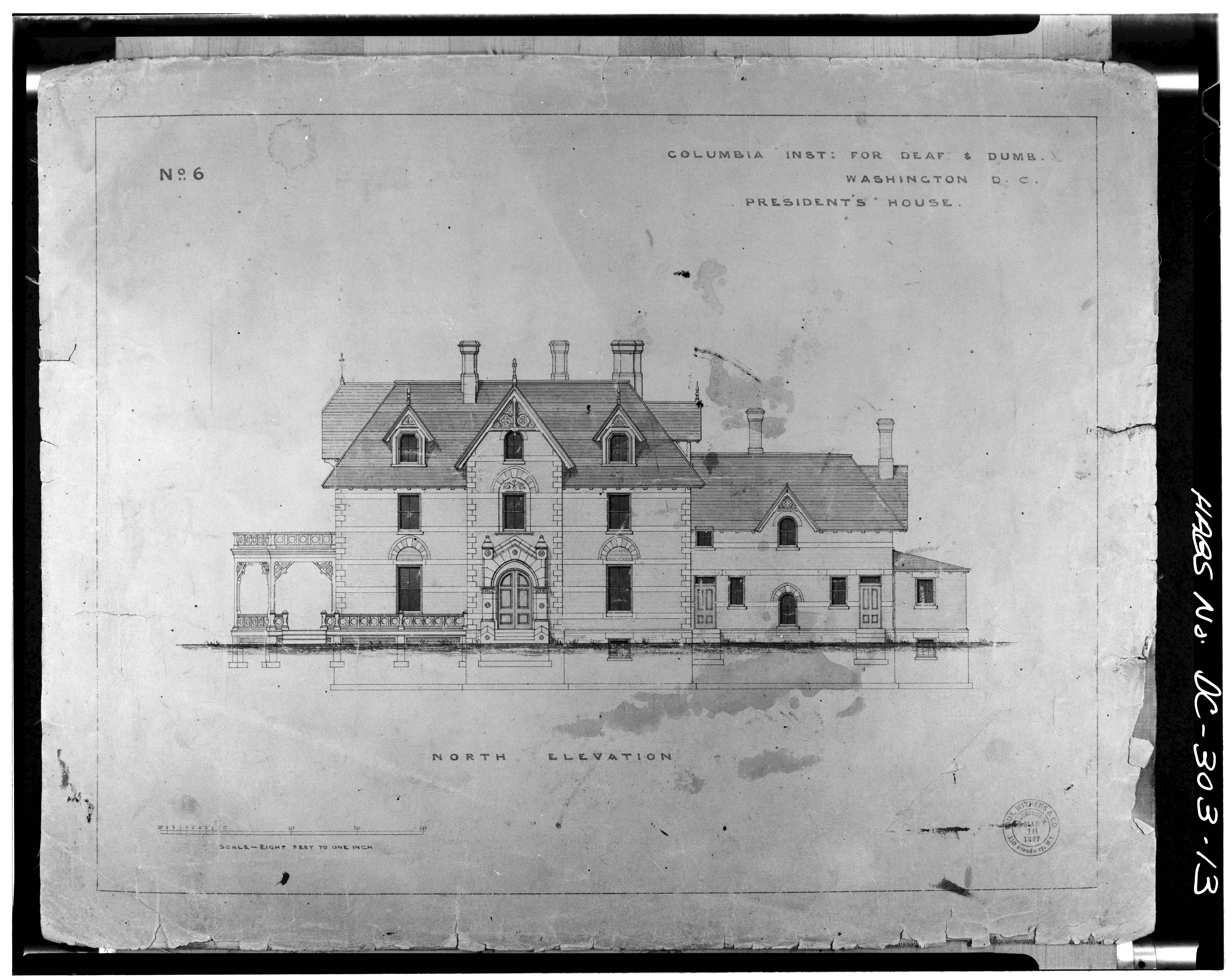
The primary elevation of the President's House, Gallaudet College (planned 1867)

Withers used the form of the house again in 1867 with his plans for the President's House at Gallaudet College, Washington DC and successive teachers' residences there. Like plans II and VI in his once employer Andrew Jackson Downing's Cottage Residences (1842), the hipped roof-square house plan was influential during the Gothic Revival following the publication of the Stevens house in Vaux's Villas and Cottages (1857).
