= W. E. Warren House =

- U.S. Historic district – Contributing property
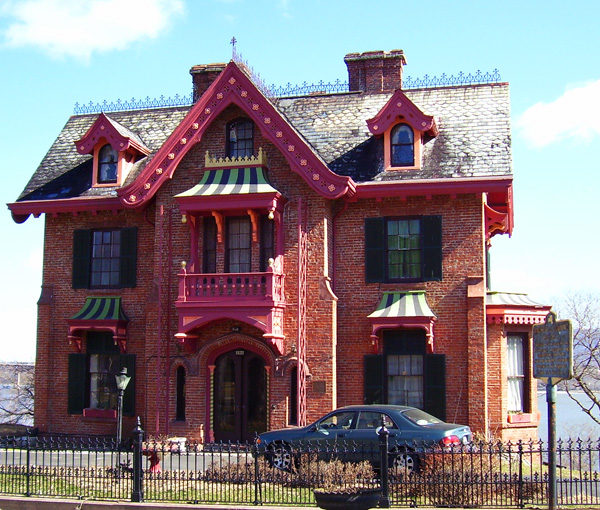
- W. E. Warren House in the 21st century

- Location within New York
- Interactive map showing the location of W. E. Warren House
- Location: 196 Montgomery Street Newburgh, New York
- Coordinates: 41°30′33.372″N 74°0′26.316″W
- Built: 1853
- Architect: Calvert Vaux
- Architectural style: Gothic Revival
- Part of: Montgomery–Grand–Liberty Streets Historic District (ID73001246)
- MPS
- Designated CP: 1973

The W. E. Warren House is a historic house located at 196 Montgomery Street in Newburgh, New York. It is a focal point of the Montgomery—Grand—Liberty Streets Historic District, one of several houses in the area built by Calvert Vaux. A historical marker for Vaux's friend and partner Andrew Jackson Downing is located outside the house.

== Description and history ==
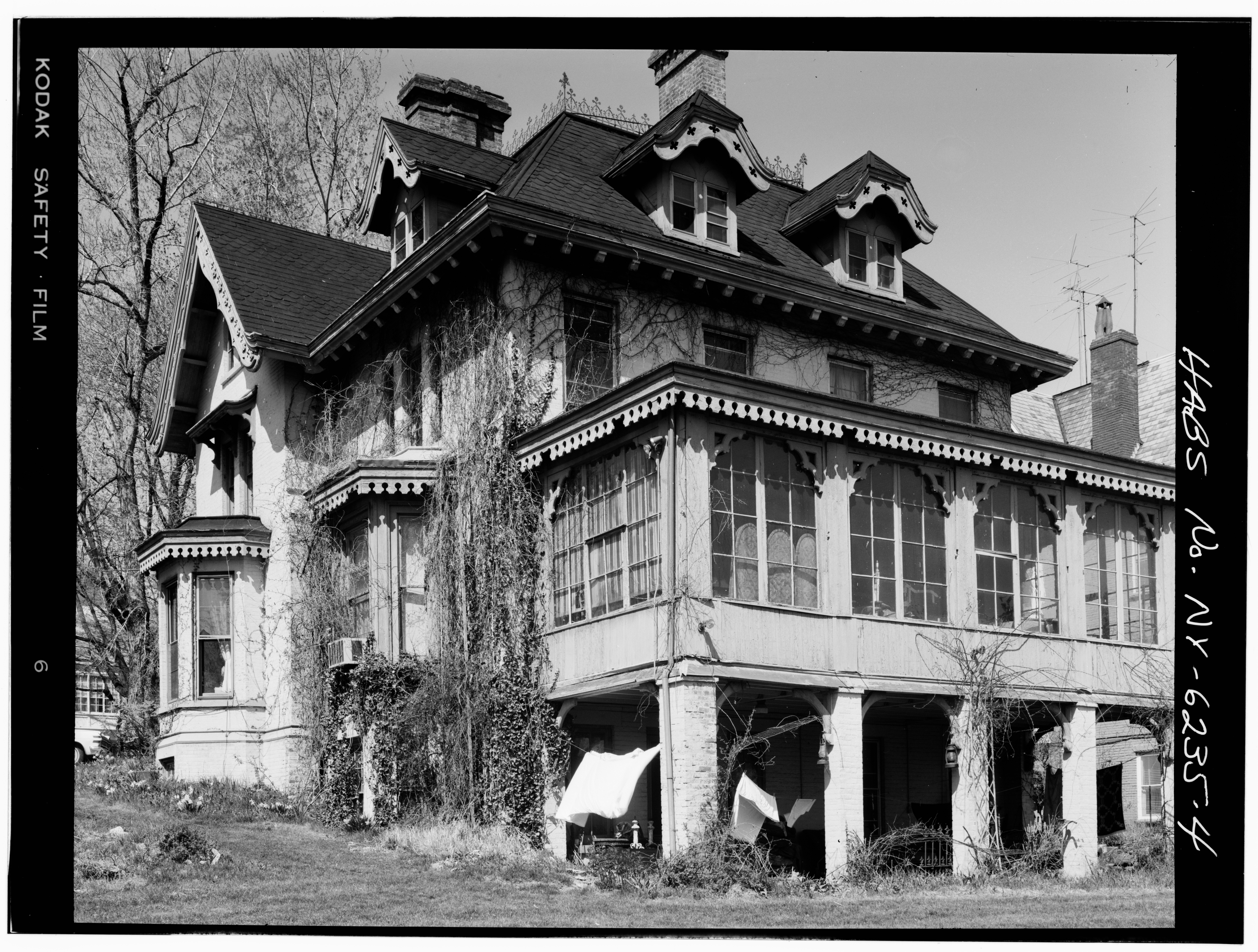
Back side of the house, showing the descent and enclosed veranda

=== Ownership ===
The house was built in 1853 and completed by early 1854 for William Edward Warren (1817—1877), who served as deputy comptroller of New York City and treasurer of the Delaware, Lackawanna and Western Railroad. Warren began his career as a clerk and bookkeeper, working for David Crawford.

Succeeding the Warrens, the Coldwell family owned the house, themselves equally affluent. The son of an English immigrant who arrived in New York in 1841, Thomas Coldwell began as an apprentice, learning to grind files. After pro-typing a machine for felt, Coldwell worked on tools for a new lawn mower machine company, H. N. Swift, inspiring Coldwell to create his own lawn mower design. In 1870, he and two partners, George L. Chadborn and Lewis M. Smith, formed Chadborn & Coldwell Manufacturing Co. Descendants of Coldwell maintained the house in the early 20th century.

In 1953, the Hodge family purchased it for use as a funeral home. They were handed down several of Warren's belongings, including his silver-clasped Bible. In 2007, the Hodges attempted to sell the house for $1,000,000, garnering much attention from the media.

In his book Villas and Cottages (1857), Vaux lists the design as No. 16, "A Picturesque Symmetrical House".

=== Exterior ===
Aware of the land plot's geography, Vaux ensured the house embraced the steep, river-facing hill that backs it. While the recessed porch and double entrance gates are placed level with Montgomery Street, the back veranda sits on brick supports.

The roof features cresting, and above the recessed porch and double doors is a small balcony.

Vaux had plans for the grounds, which included hillside paths through fruit trees and shrubs at his recommendation. In the present, a small garden and parking spaces occupy where he specified a yard should exist. From Water Street below, the hill can be seen as descending into overgrowth.

==== Bargeboards ====
The house's extravagant and slightly whimsical bargeboards define its Gothic Revival heritage. It is because of this prominent feature that the house is colloquially described as a gingerbread house. The bargeboard of each gable features an alternating pattern of quatrefoil piercings, with applied florals of the same design. The bottom half is curvilinear, pierced with trefoils and applied moulding. Two dormer windows on the front side have a bargeboard of fleur de leis and dot piercings with applied circles. On the sides and back of the house, four dormer windows carry the same curvilinear shape but only the fleur de leis piercings remain. Although the house was originally stuccoed, it was sandblasted to reveal plain brick. A house painter was hired by the Hodges who chose colors inspired by Frederic Church's Olana. The bargeboard shapes were painted maroon and pale orange, the tin awnings an alternating dark and light green.

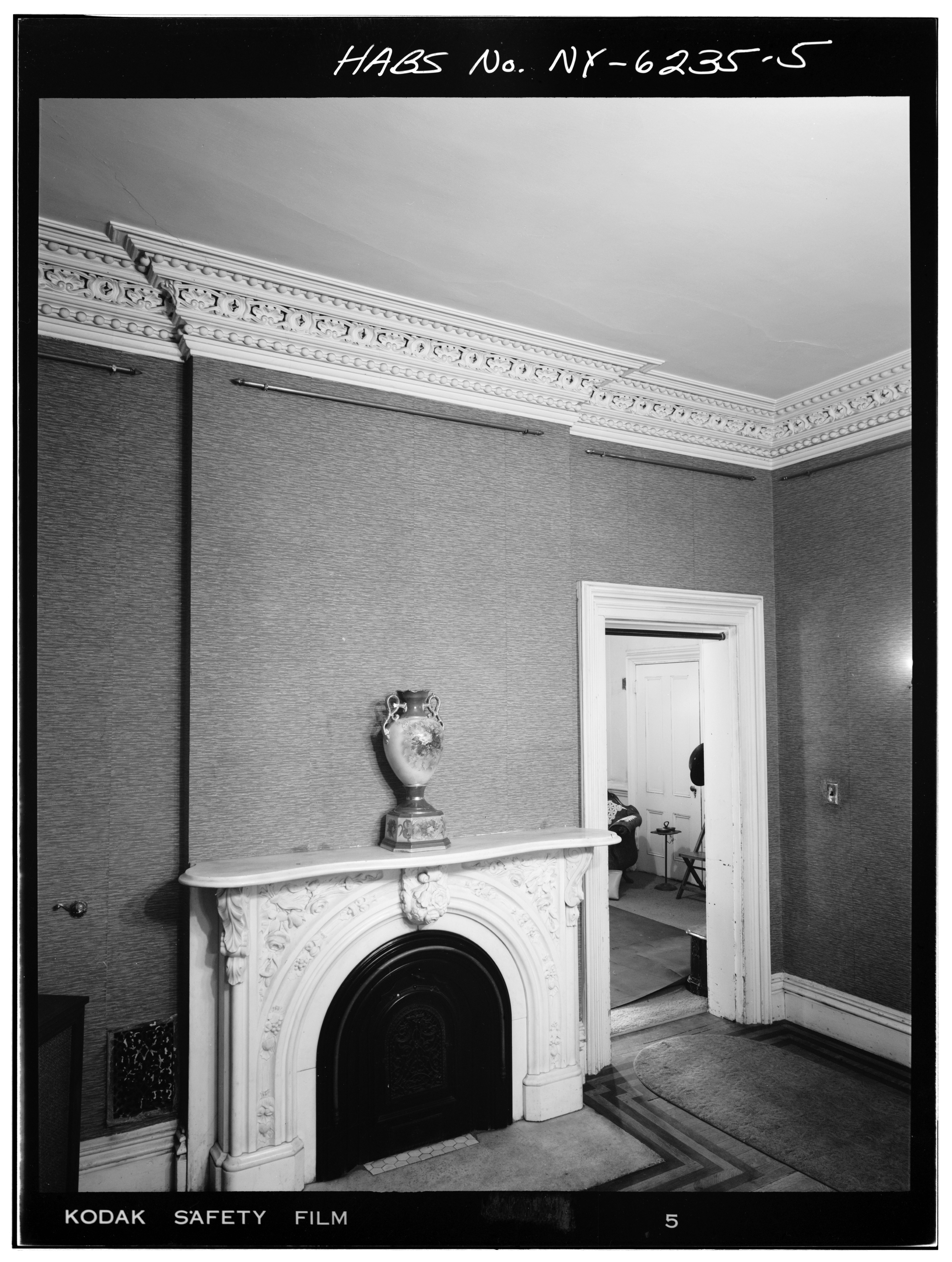
One of the first floor parlors

=== Interior ===
The entrance hall is 12' square, leading into four areas: the staircase, two parlors and a study. The staircase was planned to contain a small apartment behind it, but the room was used by Warren as a private office instead. Two parlors directly in front of the visitor are entered through sliding wooden doors, a panel between them with space for a picture.

At the back of the first floor is a veranda, now enclosed, which Vaux intended to be used frequently during the warmer months. The upper floor was originally used as a balcony, and depicted as such in illustrations.

The second floor, or chamber floor, has four bedrooms and a bathroom. Period plumbing, sinks and a bathtub are still intact. Below the first floor, the dining room and kitchen connect, with an alcove bay window in the former.
