= Dutch Reformed Church (Newburgh, New York) =

Historic church in New York, United States

- U.S. National Register of Historic Places
- U.S. National Historic Landmark
- U.S. Historic district – Contributing property
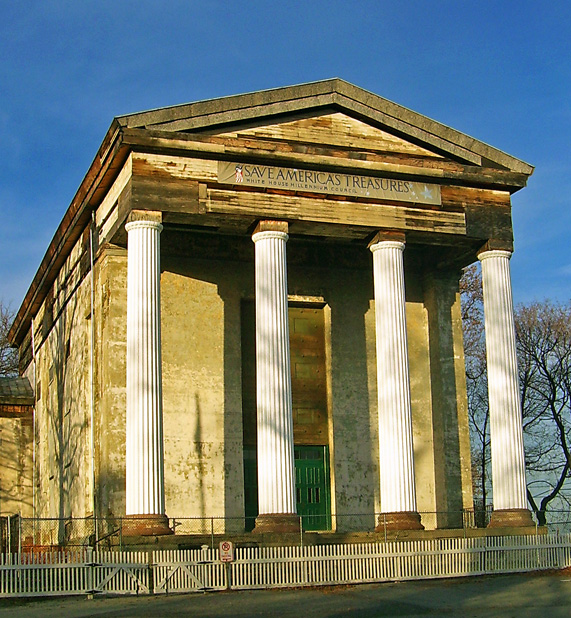
- The church in late 2006, with all four columns restored
- Location: 132 Grand St. Newburgh, NY
- Coordinates: 41°30′16.03″N 74°0′32.34″W
- Built: 1835–37; 1867–68
- Architect: Alexander Jackson Davis (church); George E. Harney (transept and extension)
- Architectural style: Greek Revival
- Part of: Montgomery-Grand-Liberty Streets Historic District (ID73001246)
- NRHP reference No.: 70000425

Significant dates
- Added to NRHP: December 18, 1970
- Designated NHL: August 7, 2001

The Dutch Reformed Church is one of the most prominent architectural landmarks in Newburgh, New York. It was designed by Alexander Jackson Davis in 1835 in the Greek Revival style just after the dissolution of his partnership with Ithiel Town. It is his only surviving church in that style and is considered to be his latest building still standing that largely reflects his original vision. The church stands at 132 Grand Street, just north of the Newburgh Free Library.

Its historical importance comes from not just over a century of use as church, but its centrality in the struggle by modern preservationists to save and restore the city's many landmark buildings. Today it is a National Historic Landmark. It was almost razed in the late 1960s and is far from completely restored. The property was added to the National Register of Historic Places in 1970, aiding its rescue from demolition.

== Description and site ==
The church is 50 feet (15 m) wide and high, and 100 feet (30 m) long. The four front Ionic order columns are 37 feet (11 m) high (the capitals have been removed for safety considerations at the moment). It sits on a bluff 250 feet (76 m) above the Hudson River, a few blocks away. In the 1830s there were no other buildings in the vicinity to impede the view, so Davis saw it as symbolizing the city to the considerable river traffic of the time.

The edifice occupies a commanding situation... Owing to the immediate and rapid descent of the ground east of the site, the basement line of the portico is above the top of the buildings between it and the river; so that the full effect of its architecture may be seen while passing the town...

The southward orientation of the columns and facade, the direction in which most shipping approached the city, was meant to echo the similar marine outreach of the Parthenon or the Temple of Poseidon at Sounion in Greece.

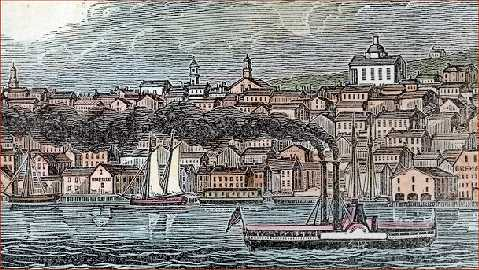
An 1842 woodcut of Newburgh showing how the church (top, right) dominated the city's skyline during that time period.

The original design included a small dome atop the roof, which Davis explained thus:

The gigantic portico, and lofty dome…will henceforth serve as a conspicuous and characteristic landmark, indicative of the taste, discrimination, and sense of classical beauty, of the inhabitants of Newburgh.

It was removed a few years after the building was completed for structural reasons. Other additions were built on to the property by the church as its growth warranted.

While the church had the neighborhood of Grand Avenue and Third Street to itself at the time of its construction, today it has become rather crowded. It is now a contributing property of the Montgomery-Grand-Liberty Streets Historic District, which includes other notable historic buildings such as the former Orange County Courthouse, another Greek Revival building (designed by locally prominent architect Thornton Niven) across the street, the library, several other large old churches (some still in use).

The current siting both enhances and complicate its aesthetic position. On the former hand, most of the buildings around it are of similar historic value. On the latter, the brutalist library that sits catty-corner from it is not only a serious contrast in styles, it blocks most of the view the river and the church once had of each other. The church, library and dilapidated former City Club of Newburgh form a small plaza; part of it is taken up by a small parking lot built by the Newburgh Enlarged City School District, which runs the library and is headquartered in it, for its own central office employees.

== History ==
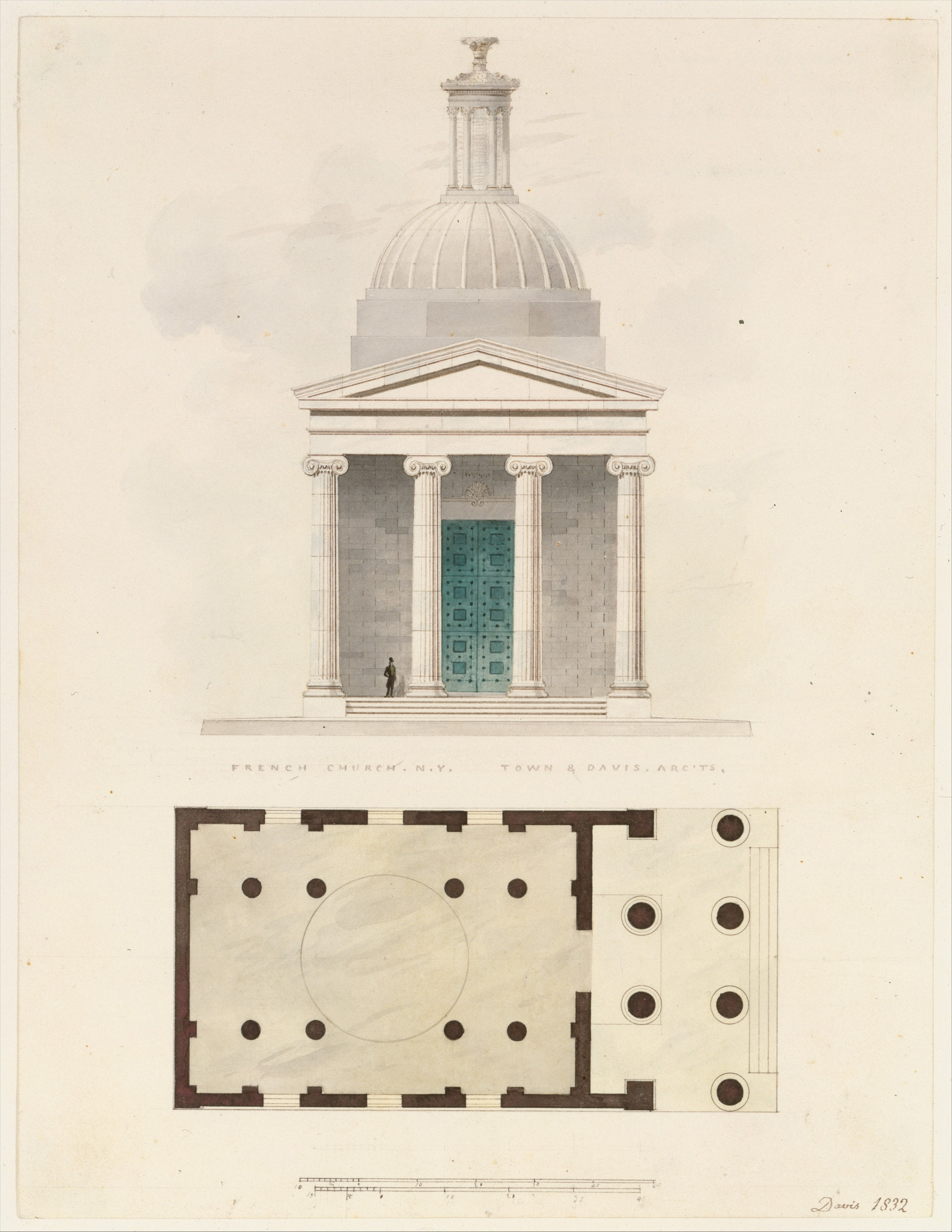
Davis based the design on Town & Davis' recent Church of the French Protestants (1832) in New York

The building's history can be divided into two eras: its actual use as a church from 1835 to 1967, and the attempts to preserve and refurbish it since then.

=== Church era ===
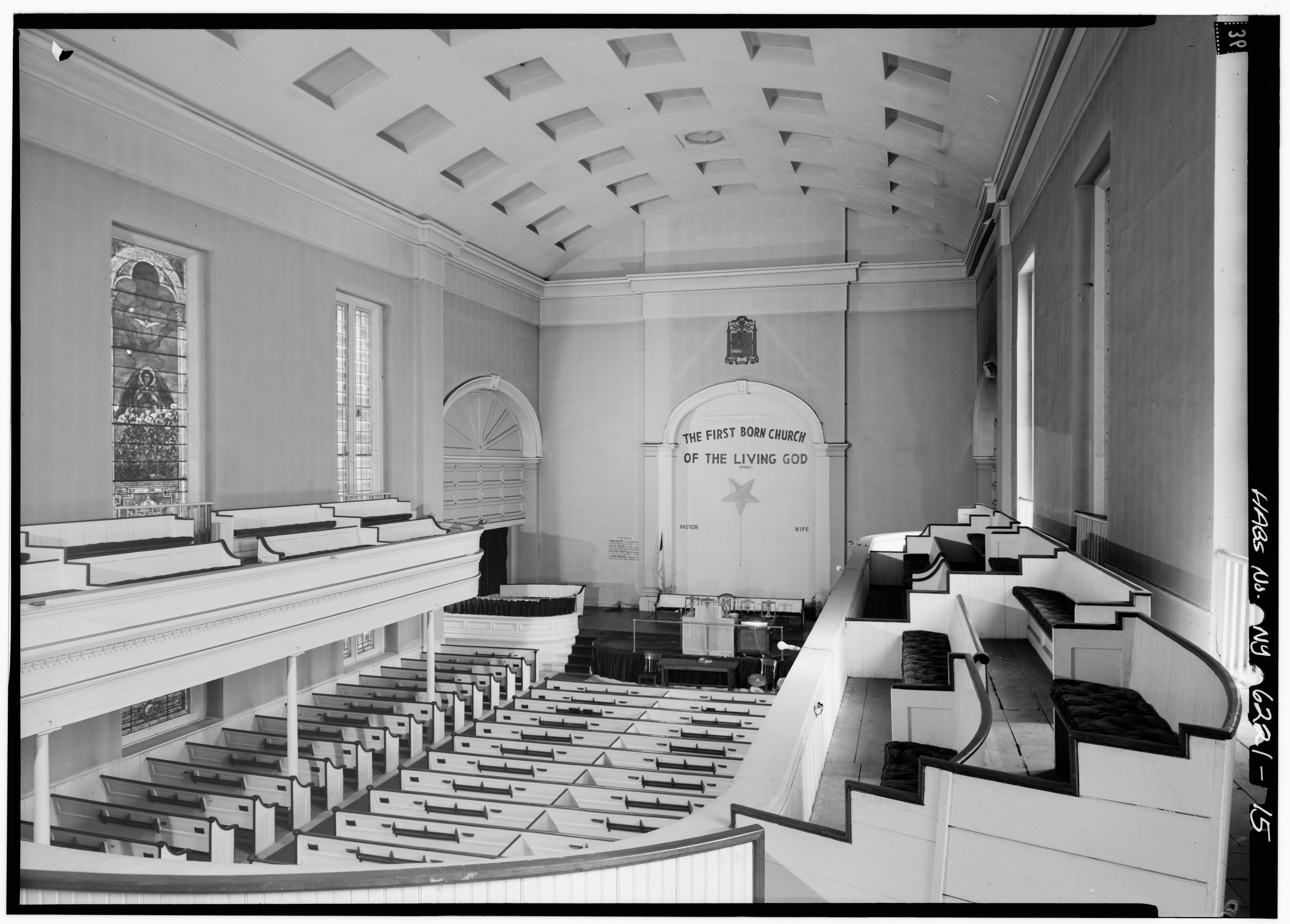
View towards pulpit showing Harney's extension (1867–68)

In 1834 the Rev. William Cruickshank was sent upriver from New York City by Dutch Reformed Church elders to start a new church. He commissioned Davis for the design, completed in July 1835. The cornerstone was laid that October. Davis' partner, Rhode Island architect Russell Warren, took the role of construction superintendent. After disagreements, Warren and Davis split in August 1836. Newburgh craftsmen Daniel Farrington and Benjamin Lander then took on construction efforts with Thornton M. Niven, stonecutter.

The church was completed and dedicated two years later. By 1839, the congregants had to mortgage the building to pay construction costs. The dome and its lantern were removed sometime between 1842–early 1845 due to structural issues.

The mortgage payments did not prevent the church from expanding the property, with a small Gothic Revival parsonage being erected on the southeast corner in 1852, where the library now stands. Seven years later, the mortgage was paid off. The church put the money it could now spend more freely to work on the structure, adding a pastor's study and recessed pulpit and repainting the interior (not completely enough; some of the original stenciled Greek motifs are still visible today).

After the Civil War, the congregation had reached 290 members. It was able to purchase an organ and add 20 feet (6.1 m) onto the north side of the building, complete with brick transept arms designed by George E. Harney. By 1882, it had grown to 400 members and paid off all its outstanding debt. The church would get a new roof two years later, followed a decade after that by a replacement organ and pulpit.

The first years of the 20th century saw it get some electric lights, and another new roof. In 1909 an iron fence was built with money paid to the church by the city for the use of its lawn during the previous year's Fulton-Hudson celebration. The following year cement replaced wood as the flooring material for the portico, and in 1920 all lighting in the building became electric when the chandeliers switched from gas.

Damage from the 1950 hurricane

For the first time in its history, the church would finally take a stable form. No major work beyond routine repair was done until after World War II, when various storms damaged the roof. However, in 1950 a hurricane blew the roof completely off. While the church was able to repair it and in fact make further improvements such as adding telephone service and a public address system, the years had taken their toll and in 1964 the congregation had acquired land in the Town of Newburgh on which to build a new edifice. Three years later, they deconsecrated Davis's building and moved out.

=== Preservation era ===
World Monuments Fund video on conservation of the Dutch Reformed Church in 2009

World Monuments Fund video on conservation of the Dutch Reformed Church in 2010

It was soon slated for demolition as part of the city's urban renewal efforts. Helen Gearn, the city's historian at the time, urged that it be preserved and somehow reused. After a feasibility study concluded it could be done, the "Palatine Square" proposal for the blocks in the immediate vicinity included the church.

Nevertheless, the next year the city claimed the church as an urban-renewal parcel, and the next year its Urban Renewal Agency paid $96,000 for it. Public efforts against its demolition led to the church's addition to the National Register of Historic Places in 1970, which meant that federal funds could no longer be used to demolish it. Newburgh had in the past taken the lead in historic preservation when Washington's Headquarters had become the first officially designated historic site in the U.S. in 1850. The battle to save the church revived this tradition and marked the beginning of the city's modern historic preservation movement.

Orange County expressed interest in buying the building as part of the "Courthouse Square" project, a proposal to redevelop the area around the courthouse just across the street, which served as Ulster County's when Newburgh was that county's seat prior to the redrawing of county boundaries that followed the creation of Rockland County in 1798. At the time, the county was still using the courthouse as a branch of the main county courts in Goshen. The Hudson Valley Philharmonic also looked into making the church its home.

The state's Office of Historic Preservation designated a historic district in nearby downtown areas of the city, but it did not include the church. The Greater Newburgh Arts Council continued working to save the church.

While the building was safe for the time being, its exterior, particularly the columns, were in an advanced state of decay. The federal Department of Housing and Urban Development which administered the city's urban-renewal grants, ordered in 1974 that it be either razed or sold. The city bought it for $7,000.

Three years later the Hudson Valley Freedom Theater (HVFT) bought the building, hoping to make it a playhouse. The purchase was conditioned on the theater company being able to renovate the structure within a certain time. The National Park Service repaired the roof. In 1984 the theater company defaulted on its contract and title reverted to the city. The following year the state expanded the city's historic district to include the church, while the NPS removed the column's Ionic capitals.

The 1990s saw the beginning of piecemeal efforts to restore the church. Another city historian, Kevin Barrett, called for the building's preservation in 1994, and the Council on the Arts intensified its efforts. It was suggested that the city or private donors restore one of the original columns, as a way of demonstrating that the restoration of the whole church, though a considerable task, was not impossible.

Hillary Clinton, then First Lady, spoke in front of the church before a large crowd on July 14, 1998, as part of the Save America's Treasures tour. The $128,205 federal grant received as part of that program paid to stabilize the church's upper gallery, which was then in imminent danger of collapse.

The 21st century began with two events that signaled the struggle over the church was not now for its preservation but its restoration. The Dutch Reformed Church Restoration Committee was formed by local activist Carla Decker, former president of the Historical Society of Newburgh Bay and the Hudson Highlands, in 2000 and the next year became part of the Newburgh Preservation Association. On August 7, 2001, the church was designated a National Historic Landmark by the Department of the Interior after a successful application by state preservation official William Krattinger.

A state grant made possible the repair and restoration of the church's drainage system and west foundation wall. The picket fence was repainted in 2004, and the following year the World Monuments Fund put the church on its list of the 100 Most Endangered Sites.

However, the work has not been enough to arrest ongoing structural decay. In 2012 much of the ceiling collapsed. Wood and plaster debris are, as of 2017, still scattered all over the floor. The west wall has also begun to show cracks as it sinks into the poorly drained underlying soil.

== Future projects ==
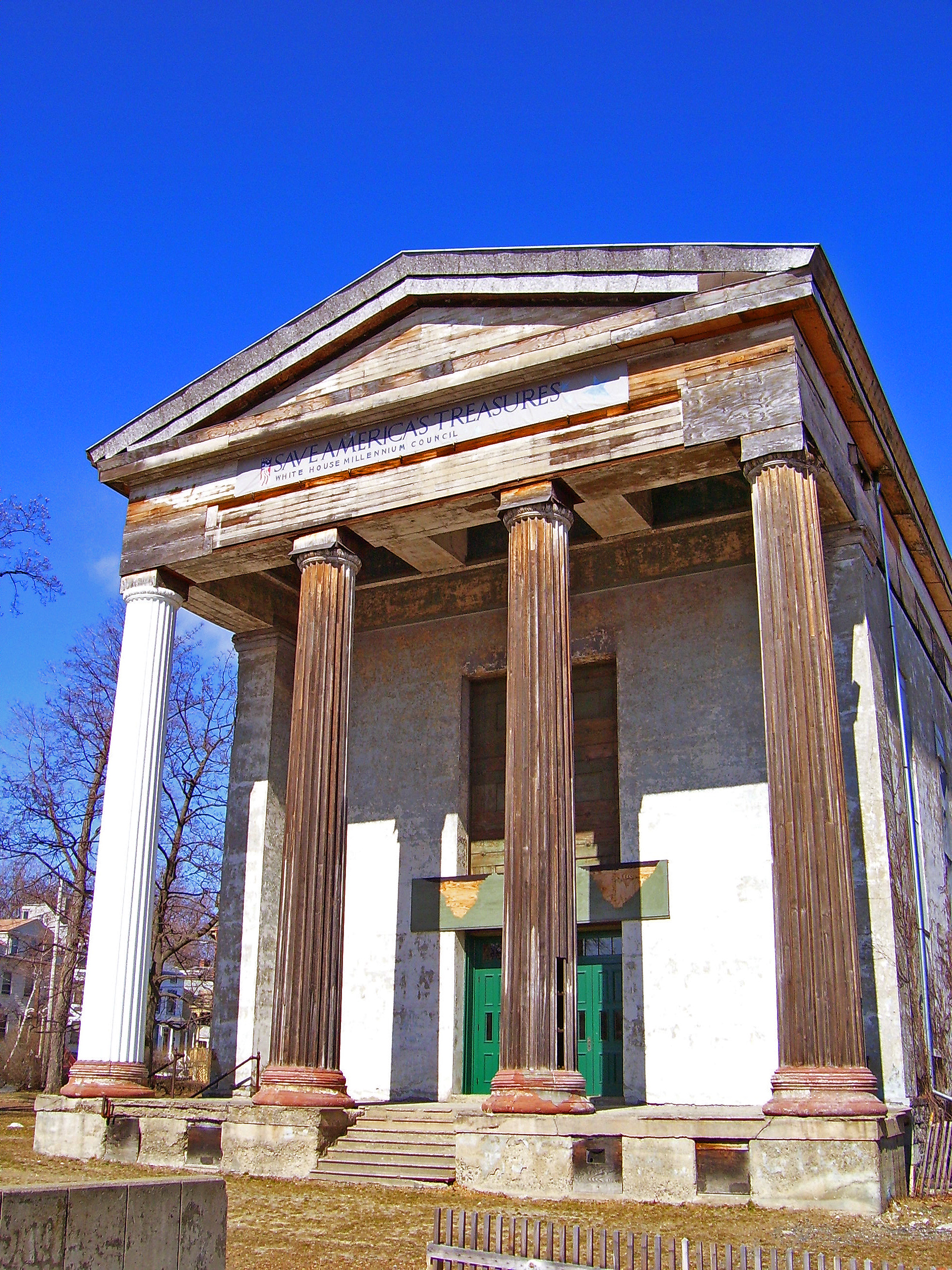
The church in February 2006, with a restored column

Today, efforts to restore the church to its original glory continue. The DRCRC is actively involved in raising money for those efforts and promoting the church's historical importance. In 2002 the NPA commissioned the Albany firm Mesick Cohen Wilson Baker to do a Historic Structure Report summarizing what needed to be done to restore the building.

One column and window were restored in 2004, the first time since the church's deconsecration that any work had been done on the building's decorative elements. In 2006, the remaining three columns were restored through a combination of in-kind repayment and donated services.

Still, much work needs to be done. Estimates for implementing all the suggestions of the Historic Structure Report and completely restoring the church have ranged as high as $8 million. After restoration, ideas for what to do with the church have centered around cultural activities, consistent with similar such secondary uses in the past. In 2006 the Newburgh Preservation Association, with a grant from the Dyson Foundation, commissioned an Adaptive Re-Use Study to outline potential uses.

To address the collapsed ceiling and cracked west wall, the city announced in late 2017 that it was seeking an $850,000 state grant for stabilization work, in advance of fears that heavy snowfall expected the coming winter could completely collapse the roof. A New York City-based developer, Alembic, had already agreed that summer to redevelop the church, the nearby City Club building and another neglected structure on the city's waterfront. "We've had 30 years to do something and we haven't been able to pull it off," admitted Deirde Glenn, the city's planning and development director.

== See also ==
- List of National Historic Landmarks in New York
- National Register of Historic Places listings in Orange County, New York

== Sources ==
- William E. Krattinger, "National Historic Landmark Nomination: Dutch Reformed Church, Newburgh" (Washington, DC: National Historic Landmarks Survey, 2001).
