= David Crawford House =

Historic house in New York, United States

- U.S. National Register of Historic Places
- U.S. Historic district – Contributing property
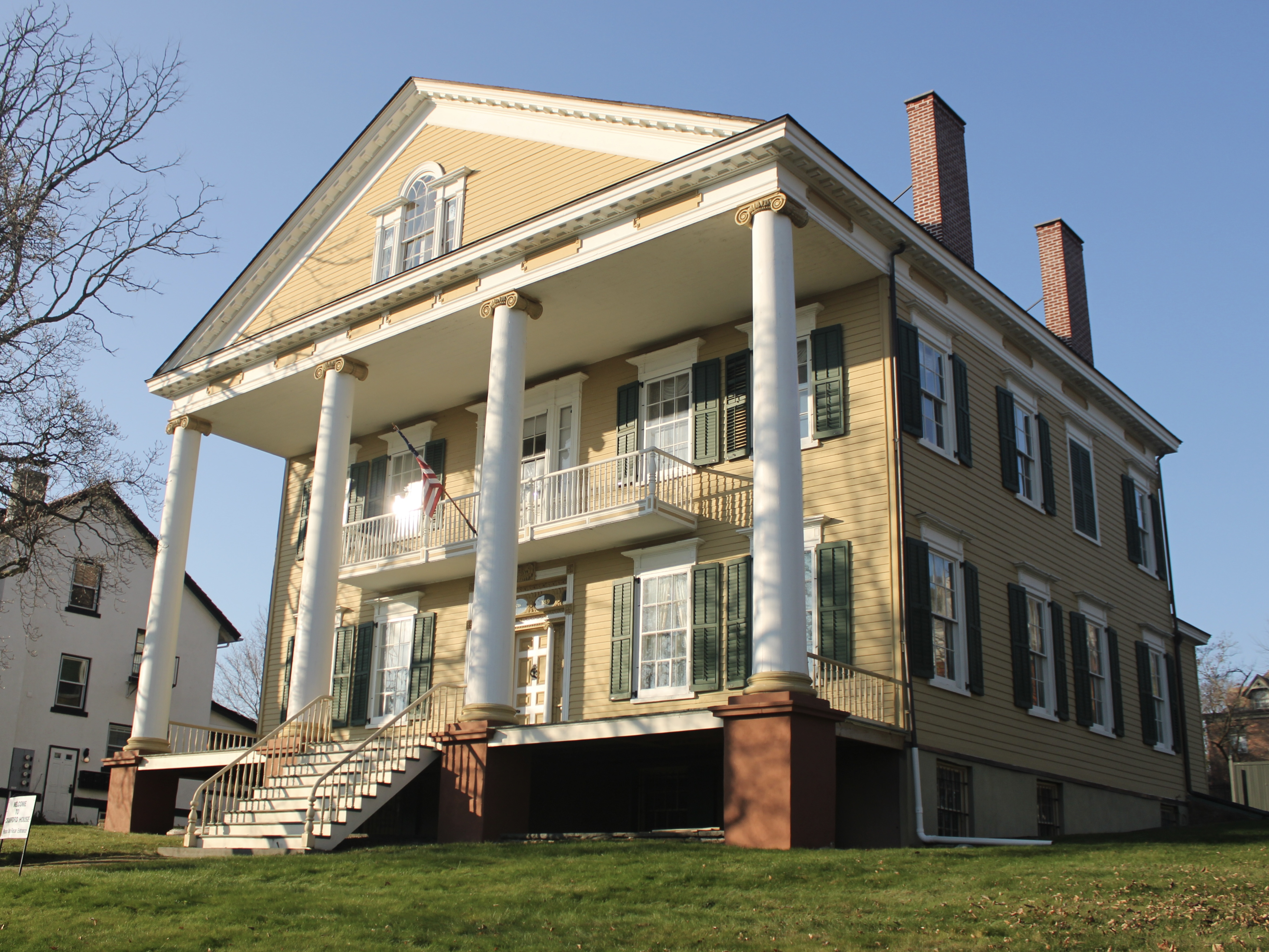
- The house in 2022

- Location within New York Location within the United States
- Location: 189 Montgomery St., Newburgh, NY
- Coordinates: 41°30′32″N 74°00′29″W
- Built: 1830–31
- Architectural style: Federal
- Part of: Montgomery-Grand-Liberty Streets Historic District (ID73001246)
- NRHP reference No.: 72000899

Significant dates
- Added to NRHP: September 27, 1972
- Designated CP: July 16, 1973

The David Crawford House is a historic house located at 189 Montgomery Street in Newburgh, Orange County, New York. It currently serves as a museum, archive and headquarters for the Historical Society of Newburgh Bay and The Highlands.

== Description and history ==
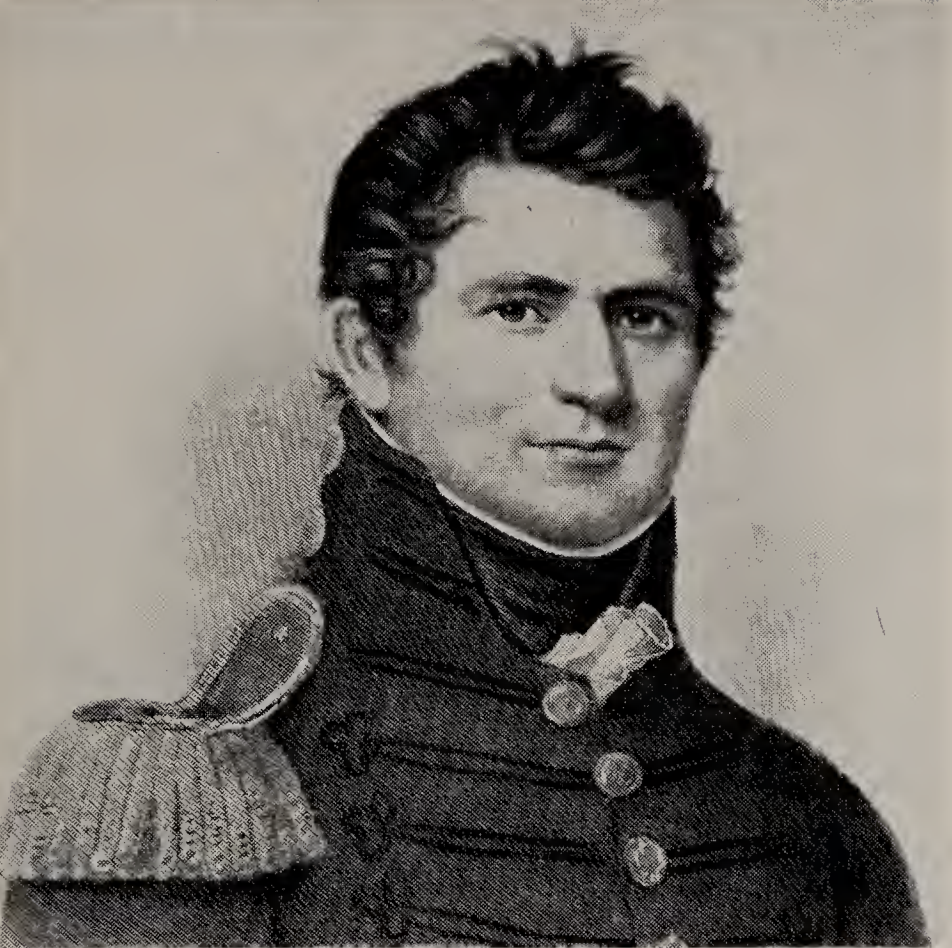
David Crawford

The mansion could be described as a conjunction of the Greek Revival and late Federal-styles. It was built by David Crawford, who had made his fortune in Hudson River shipping in during the 1820s. Crawford was leased the land on March 8, 1830, by the Trustees of the Glebe, for a period of 900 years. His family originated from Ulster, and immigrated to America in 1731, settling Little Britain alongside the Clinton family. The Crawfords moved to Newburgh in 1806 as David's father, Francis, saw a burgeoning market for agricultural products. With Eunice Watkins of Campbell Hall, he had four sons: David, Thomas, Samuel and James. The brothers and their mother succumbed to tuberculosis, and David ameliorated his health by accepting a job as a deputy sheriff in 1810. Frequent horseback-riding built up his immunity.

As the War of 1812 broke out, Crawford enlisted in the army and formed a volunteer company which relocated to New York Harbor. He became attached to an artillery regiment and eventually promoted to captain. After spending time in the harbor, he gained an understanding of shipping and maritime trade, becoming interested in their economic benefits.

In May 1822, David Crawford married Fanny C. Belknap, daughter of General Isaac Belknap. They had two daughters, Mary Elizabeth, called "Lib", and Anna. In 1825, he became involved in the building of a steamboat to freight goods from Newburgh to New York City. The steamer Baltimore, purchased during the winter of 1829–1830, began shipping from D. Crawford & Co.'s wharf that spring.

=== Architecture ===
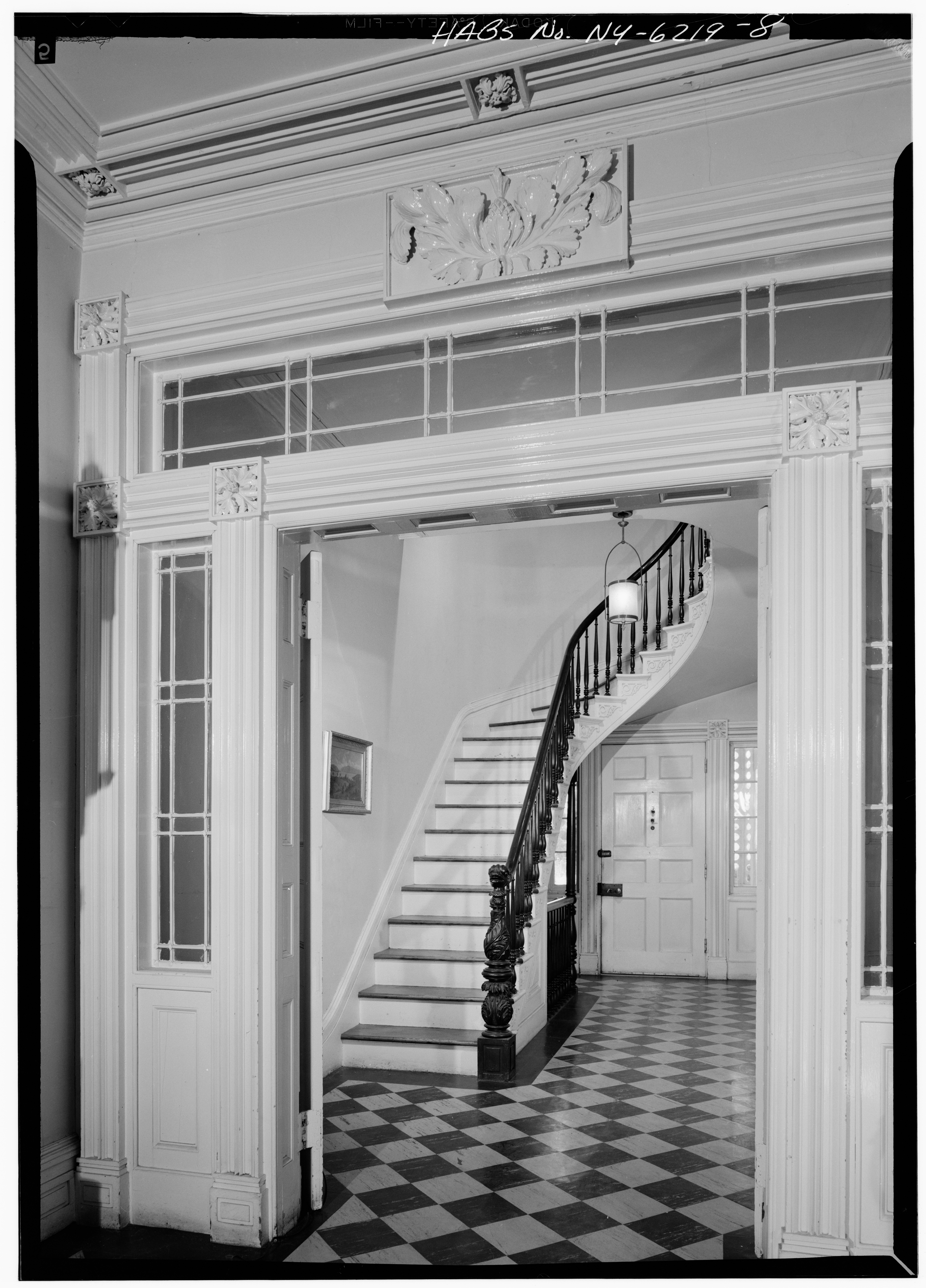
The free-standing staircase of the Crawford House, looking west

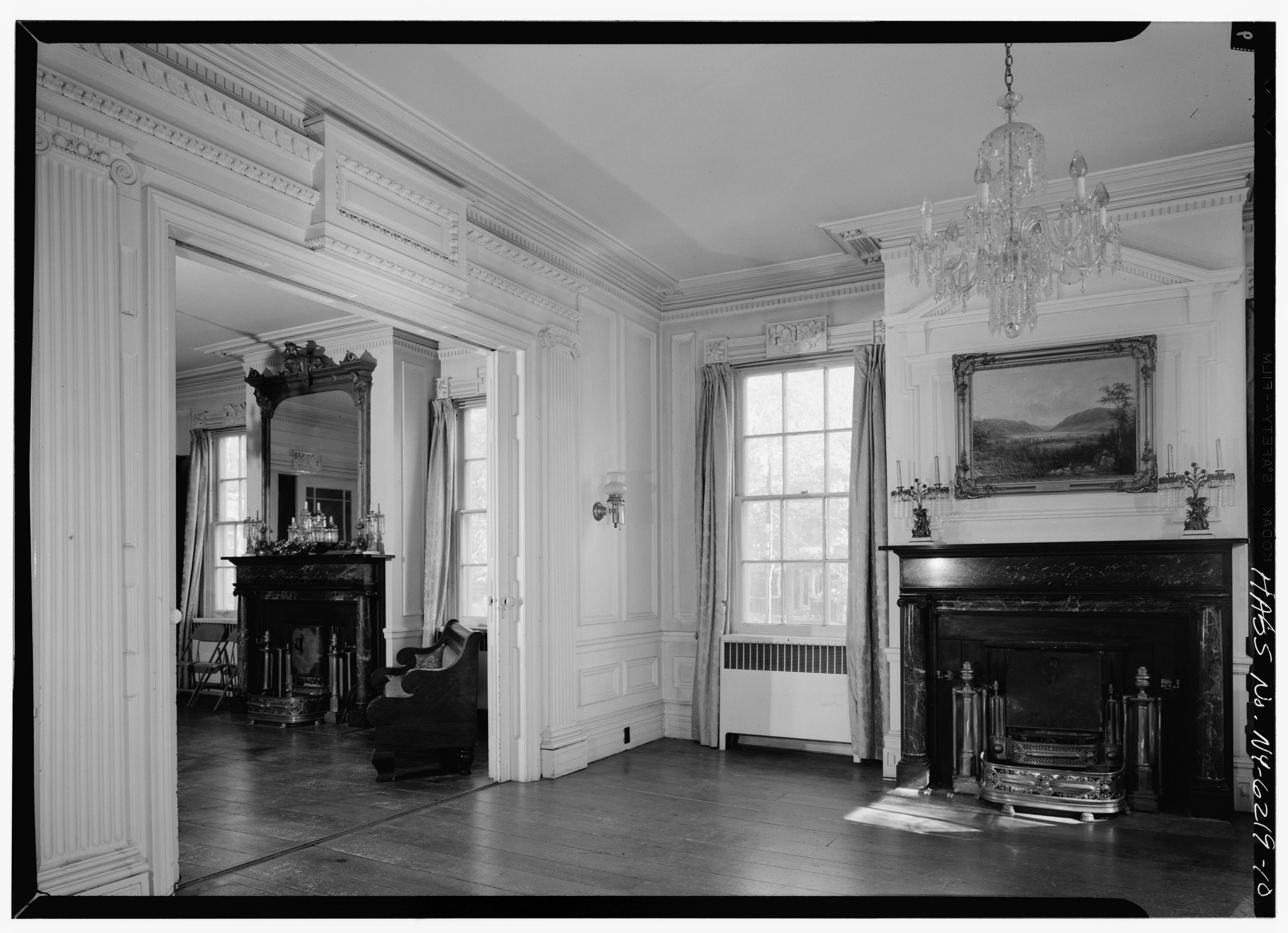
Northeast parlors showing doorway and mantle with pilasters, pediments and molding. The fireplaces are of black marble.

The carpenter of the house remains unknown.

Architrave trim of an elaborate design gives a flaunting impression, and carved laurel details in head blocks above the doors are seen consistently. The free-standing stairs have mahogany balusters and elegant brackets. A most curious detail of the staircase is the iconic newel post, a carved dolphin head. It is thought to be the work of a New York City furniture carver or Massachusetts ship figurehead maker.

The doors of the upstairs floor, and most on the main floor, are pine, painted with faux bois.

Perhaps the house's most imposing element is its large pediment, centered with a Palladian window, supported by four 40' ionic columns.

=== Historical Society's Acquisition ===
On October 3, 1953, the house was scheduled for a public auction. Many feared the nearby funeral home would purchase and demolish it to make room for a parking lot. On September 28, the Historical Society of Newburgh Bay & The Highlands decided to purchase the house. The Ossoli Club, Trustees of Washington's Headquarters and the Daughters of the American Revolution also contributed to the purchase as well as subsequent fundraising.

Period furniture was donated for the interior, including a Duncan Phyfe sofa. Senator Thomas C. Desmond donated a period knocker. An inlaid white holly table was donated by Mary Roe Zeigler, wife of Lee Woodward Zeigler.

It was added to the National Register of Historic Places in on September 27, 1972, and became a contributing property when the Montgomery-Grand-Liberty Streets Historic District was established the following year. Today it is the headquarters of the society, which operates as a seasonal museum open to the public on Sundays and for special events. Its collection of historical artifacts, particularly boat prints and models, relate to Crawford's business in an exhibit on his life. The collection also features a Gothic chimney rescued from the demolished mansion of A. J. Downing. The historical society obtained a grant from the state in 2007 to repair the roof, chimneys, gutters, and facade. The house also received a top-to-bottom paint job.
