= Newburgh Free Library =

Coordinates: 41°30′14.24″N 74°0′30.84″W

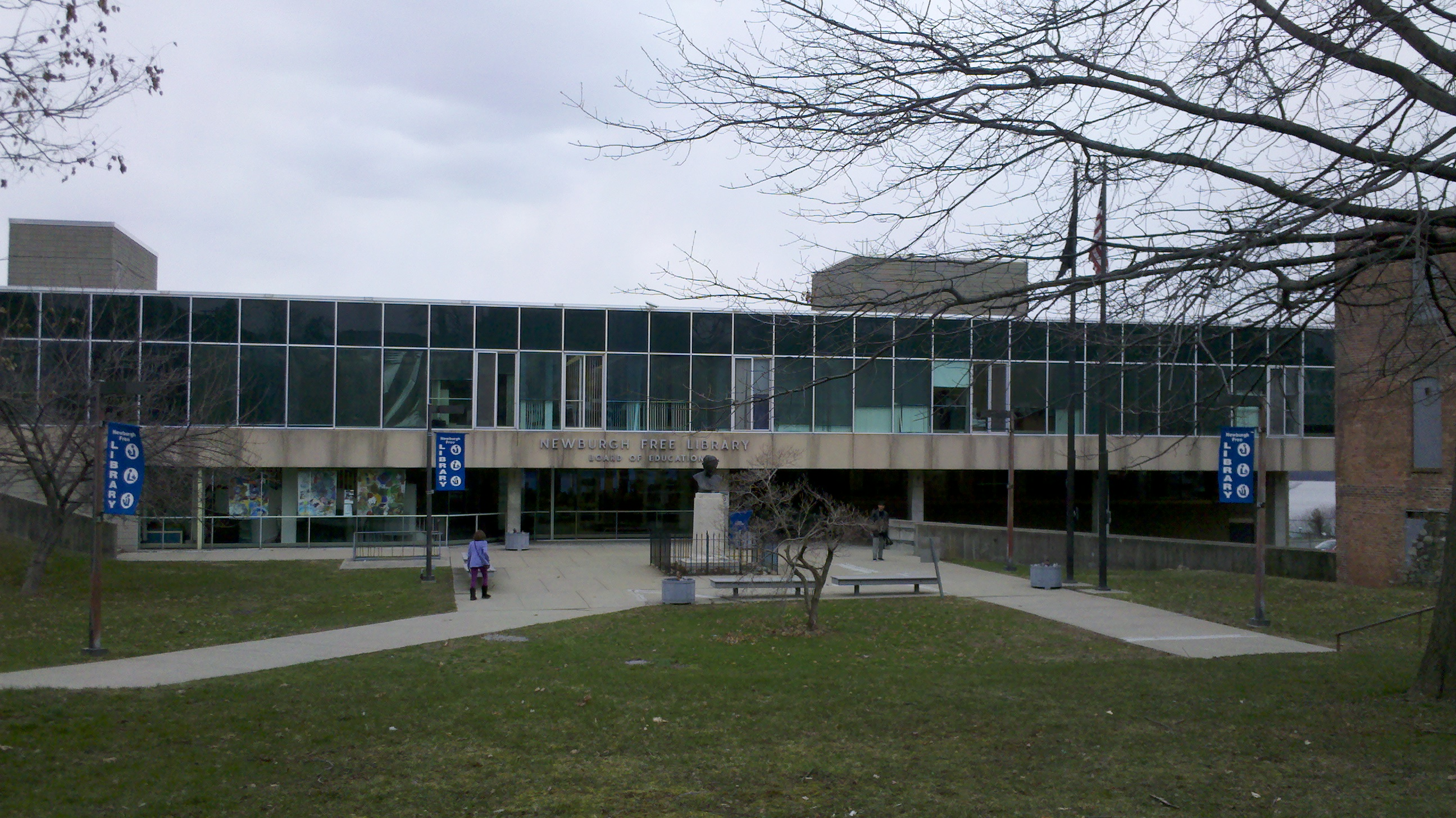
- Location: Newburgh, New York, United States
- Type: City library
- Established: 1852
- Branches: 2

Other information
- Website: https://www.newburghlibrary.org/

The Newburgh Free Library serves as the public library for the residents of the Newburgh Enlarged City School District. The Newburgh Free Library is the Central Reference Library for the Ramapo-Catskill Library System and is a member of the Newburgh Library Collaborative. In fiscal year 2010, the Newburgh Free Library had a collection of over 300,000 print and electronic resources.

== Overview ==
The Newburgh Free Library is currently located in a four-story building overlooking the Hudson River at 124 Grand Street in Newburgh, NY. The library's main goals are to “provide substantial print resources and traditional services and to secure the technology to make the library a globally relevant information center." Some of the library's programs include the Homework Help Center, Parent-Child Workshops, a Heritage Festival for Hispanics, the award-winning Business Resources and Information Exchange (BRIX), computer training courses in the library's e-Learning Center, and a local history and genealogy research room.

== History ==
In 1852, the newly established City of Newburgh school system consolidated the city's libraries—the Newburgh Academy Library, the Glebe School Library, the Newburgh Lyceum Society Library, the Mechanics Library Association, and the Young Men's Mutual Improvement Library—into one free, public library called the Newburgh Free Library. This would be New York State's fourth public library and it would operate under the Board of Education. The Newburgh Free Library opened to the public on Nov. 6, 1852 in a schoolroom at the Newburgh Academy. It contained 2,001 volumes. Originally the library was only open on Saturdays from 2–3 p.m., but eventually, the library increased its hours to include Tuesdays from 7–9 p.m. for men, Thursdays from 1–5 p.m. for ladies, and Saturdays 8 a.m. to noon for children.

In 1860, the city decided to build a separate building for the growing library, which now stocked 4,000 volumes. This building adjoined the high school on the corner of Grand and Campbell streets. Twelve years later, after the high school had merged with the Academy, the building was torn down and replaced by the Grand Street Elementary School. The Newburgh Free Library then occupied a room in a wing of the new elementary school.

- Old City Library
- U.S. Historic district – Contributing property
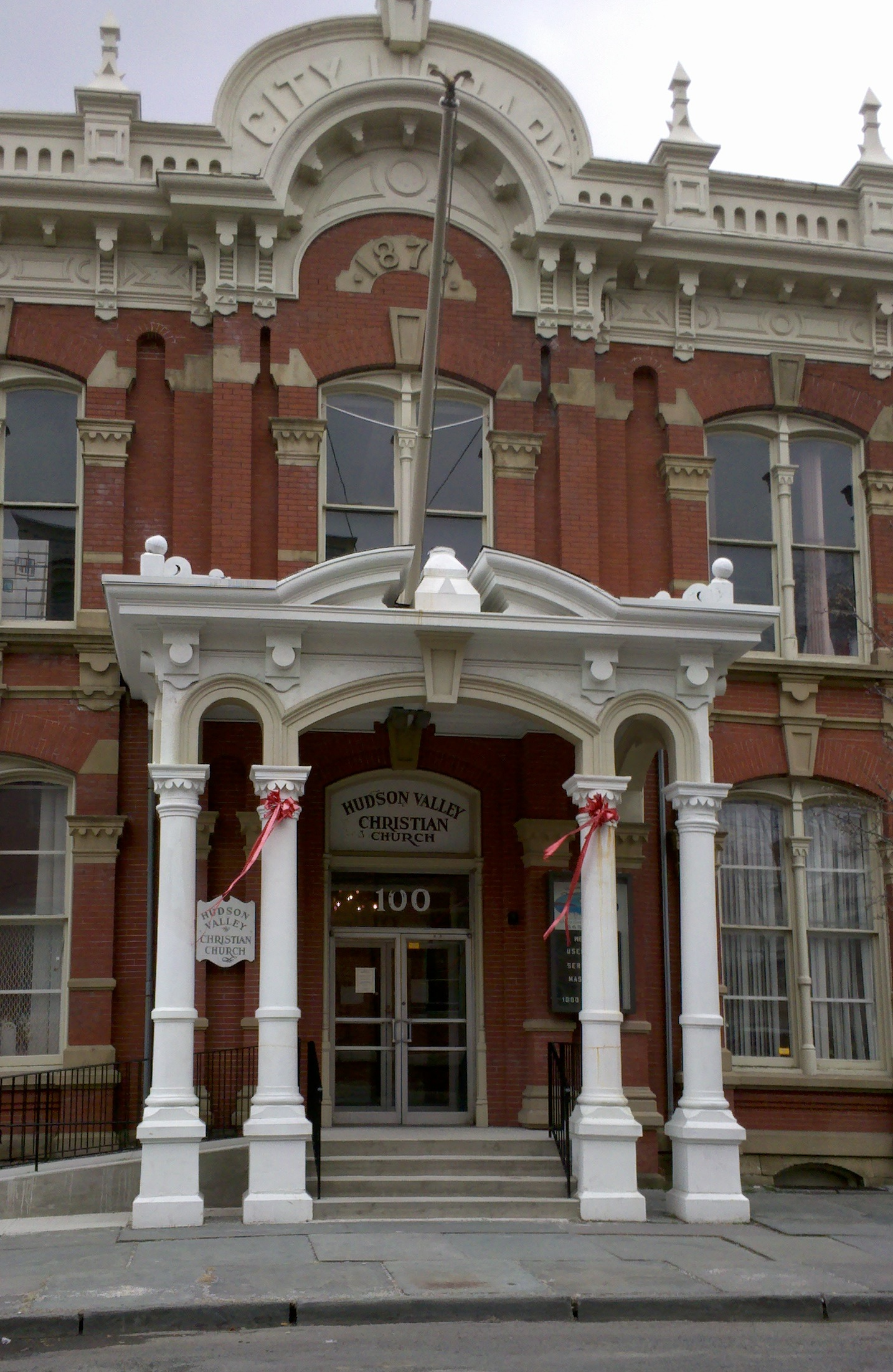
- Location: 100 Grand St, Newburgh, NY
- Built: 1878
- Architect: John A. Wood, William Hilton
- Architectural style: High Victorian Italianate
- Part of: Montgomery–Grand–Liberty Streets Historic District

In 1878, the library and its expanded collection of 10,421 volumes moved into the newly built high Victorian-style building at 100 Grand Street designed by J.A. Wood. The library now had a card catalog system; although, librarians retrieved books for patrons from closed-off stacks. It also extended its hours; it was now open from 10 a.m. to 9 p.m., every day except Sunday and holidays.

In 1909, the library's collection expanded to 36,075 volumes, 10,000 of which were lent by the United States government, as the library was, and still is, a part of the Federal Depository Library Program. To accommodate the library's expanding collection, the Board of Education decided to enlarge the building by buying the property at 98 Grand Street for $8,500. In 1921, the library adopted the Dewey Decimal Classification system, allowing for open shelving and patron browsing.

In 1976, the Newburgh Free Library moved once again. With a growing population and collection, the Board of Education had a new library building constructed just north of the 1876 library building, at 124 Grand Street.

In 2010, the Newburgh Free Library formed the Newburgh Library Collaborative with the libraries at Orange County Community College and the Curtin Library at Mount Saint Mary College, making resources from these libraries available to the patrons.
