= United States Post Office (Newburgh, New York) =

- U.S. Post Office
- U.S. National Register of Historic Places
- U.S. Historic district – Contributing property
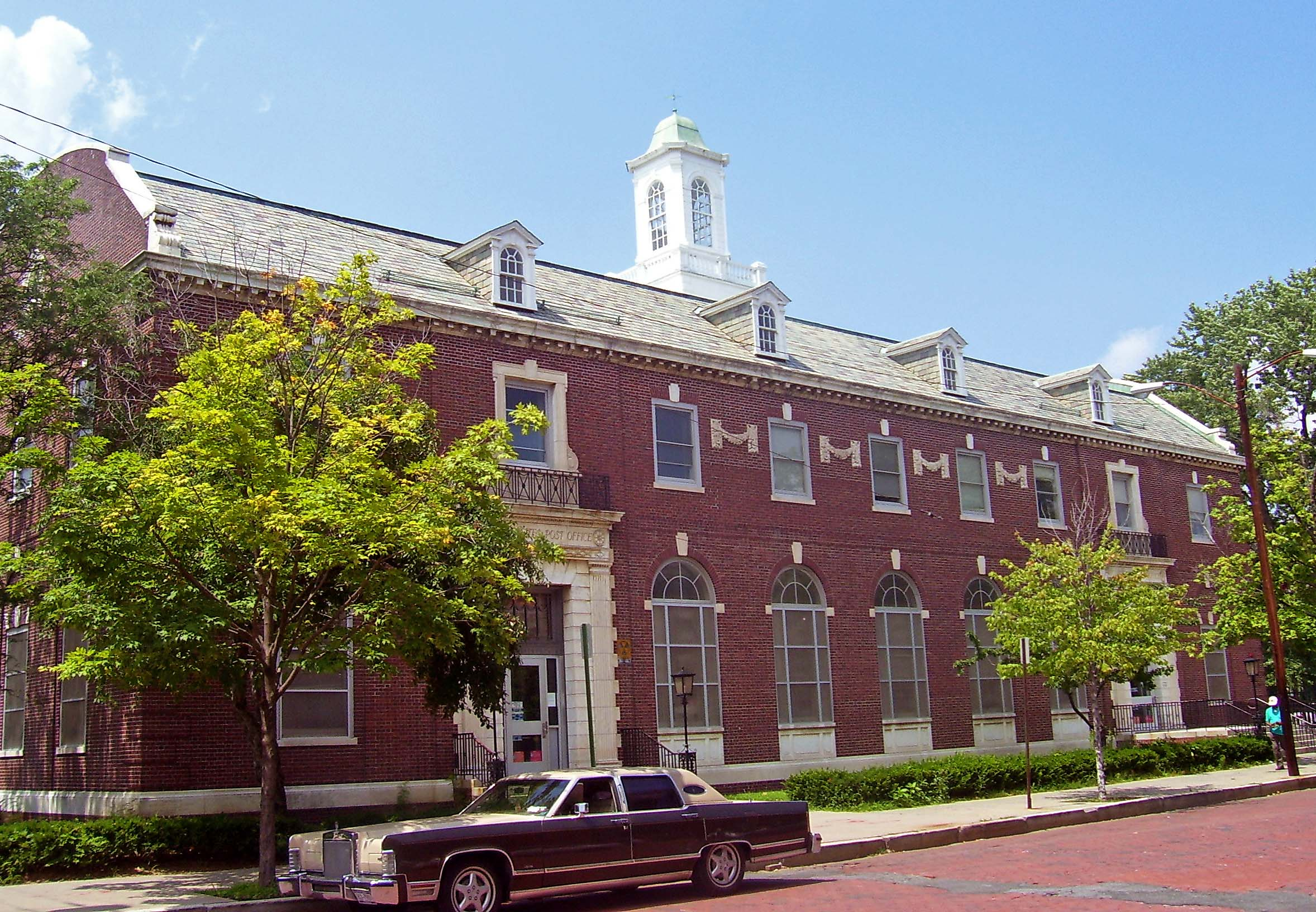
- Front of post office building along Liberty Street, 2007

- Location within New York Location within the United States
- Location: Newburgh, NY
- Coordinates: 41°30′12″N 74°00′39″W
- Area: less than one acre
- Built: 1930-31
- Architect: James Wetmore
- Architectural style: Colonial Revival
- MPS: US Post Offices in New York State, 1858-1943, TR
- NRHP reference No.: 88002367
- Added to NRHP: May 11. 1989

The main U.S. Post Office in Newburgh, New York is located at 215-217 Liberty Street two blocks north of Broadway. It serves the 12550 ZIP Code, which covers the city and nearby areas of the Town of Newburgh. There is a branch station located on Broadway in the western neighborhood of the city. The building itself is a two-story brick structure built in the early 1930s. It was designed under the supervision of James Wetmore, supervising architect for the Treasury Department at the time, and takes a Colonial Revival style.

It was added to the National Register of Historic Places in 1989; it is also a contributing property to the Montgomery-Grand-Liberty Streets Historic District.
