= Montgomery–Grand–Liberty Streets Historic District =

Historic district in New York, United States

- Montgomery–Grand–Liberty Streets; Historic District
- U.S. National Register of Historic Places
- U.S. Historic district
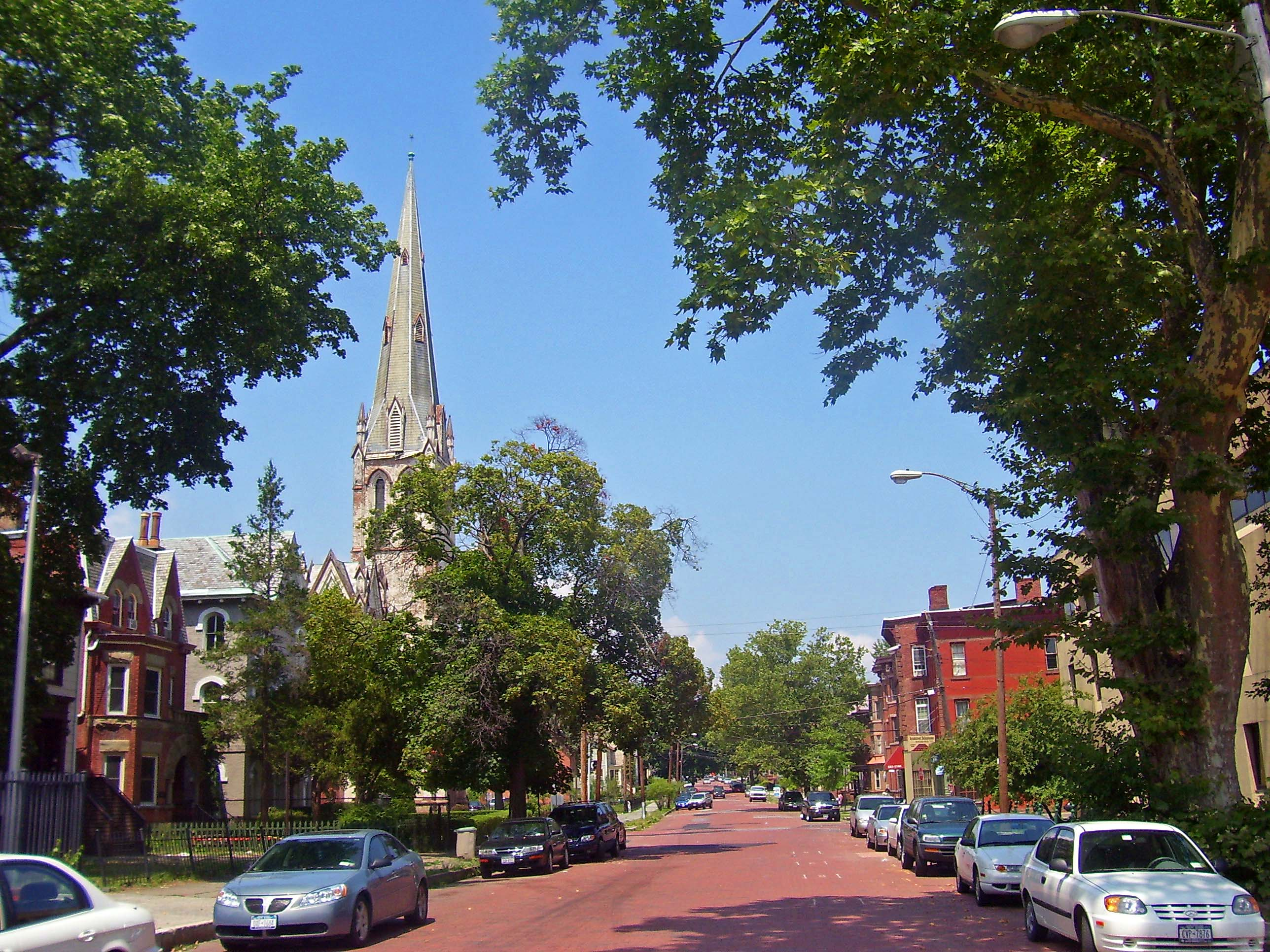
- Looking north on Liberty Street, 2007
- Interactive map showing the location of Montgomery-Grand-Liberty Street
- Location: Newburgh, NY
- Coordinates: 41°30′21″N 74°00′38″W
- Area: 1,010 acres (4.1 km^{2})
- Built: 19th century
- NRHP reference No.: 73001246
- Added to NRHP: 1973

The Montgomery–Grand–Liberty Streets Historic District was the first of two historic districts to be designated in the city of Newburgh, New York, United States. It runs along the three named north-south streets in the northeast quadrant of the city and includes 250 buildings in its 1,010 acres (4.1 km^{2}). The later East End Historic District (Newburgh, New York) is nearby.

Much of the district's historical character comes from its historic homes, dating to the 19th century. Many were built by local industrialists to take advantage of the views over the Hudson River available from the neighborhood. Some incorporated groundbreaking design trends pioneered by Newburgh native Andrew Jackson Downing, making the area important in architectural history. It was thus added to the National Register of Historic Places in 1973. Three contributing properties — the David Crawford House, Old Town Cemetery, and Newburgh's main post office — are separately listed on the Register, and one, the Dutch Reformed Church, has been recognized as a National Historic Landmark.

== History ==
The district was defined and recognized by the city, then the state and finally the National Register when historic preservationists in the city worried about the effects of urban renewal on a neglected asset. The Dutch Reformed Church had only recently been saved from demolition after almost a decade of vacancy; before that, the Crawford House had come close to being bulldozed for a school parking lot.

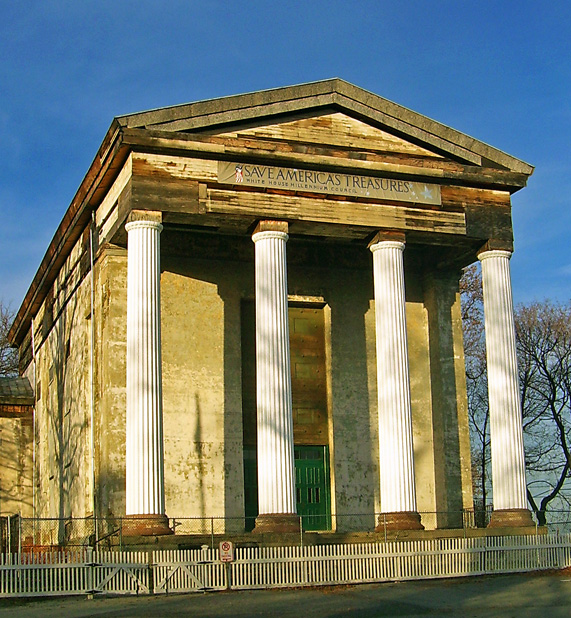
The Dutch Reformed Church

In 1977, the city council enlarged the district greatly and renamed it the East End Historic District, including Washington's Headquarters State Historic Site and other buildings in the neighborhoods south of Broadway. It established a zoning code to maintain a consistent appearance of new construction in the district and a seven-member Architectural Review Commission to enforce it. In 1985 a smaller version of the East End district was listed separately on the National Register.

Some of the urban decay and blight that has been a problem in that district is visible within the Montgomery–Grand–Liberty corridor. The most visible example is the cobblestone surface of Liberty Street, neglected for many years and frequently cut open by local utility companies for repairs and resurfaced with asphalt. The city has restored it in patches and would like to do the entire street, but lacks the money.

Many of the homes in the district (particularly the northern blocks) have been attractive to new residents who have often renovated them. Much of the district retains its original character of a leafy residential neighborhood.

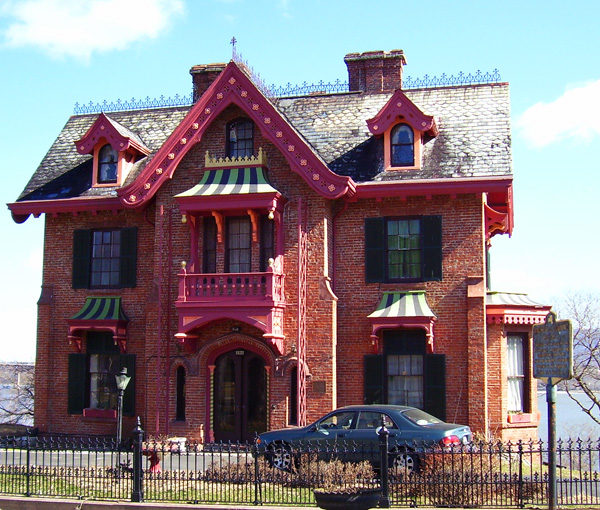
Calvert Vaux's Warren House, epitomizing the highly decorative designs Downing popularized.

== Contributing properties ==
In addition to the four noted above, the district is also home to the W. E. Warren House, considered a textbook example of the villa-style house advocated by Downing (although designed by Calvert Vaux), the 1842 Orange County courthouse designed by Thornton Niven (a copy of his contemporary Goshen courthouse), the 1878 Newburgh Free Library, the gambrel-roofed Selah Reeve House that carried Newburgh and the Hudson far and wide on a popular piece of 18th-century kitchenware, and many of Newburgh's oldest churches.
