= Proudfit =

Proudfit is a surname. Notable people with the surname include:

- Andrew Proudfit (1820–1883), American politician and businessman
- David Law Proudfit (1842–1897), American poet and lithographer
- James Kerr Proudfit (1831–1917), American Civil War colonel, surveyor and politician
