= Newburgh, New York =

City in New York, United States

- City
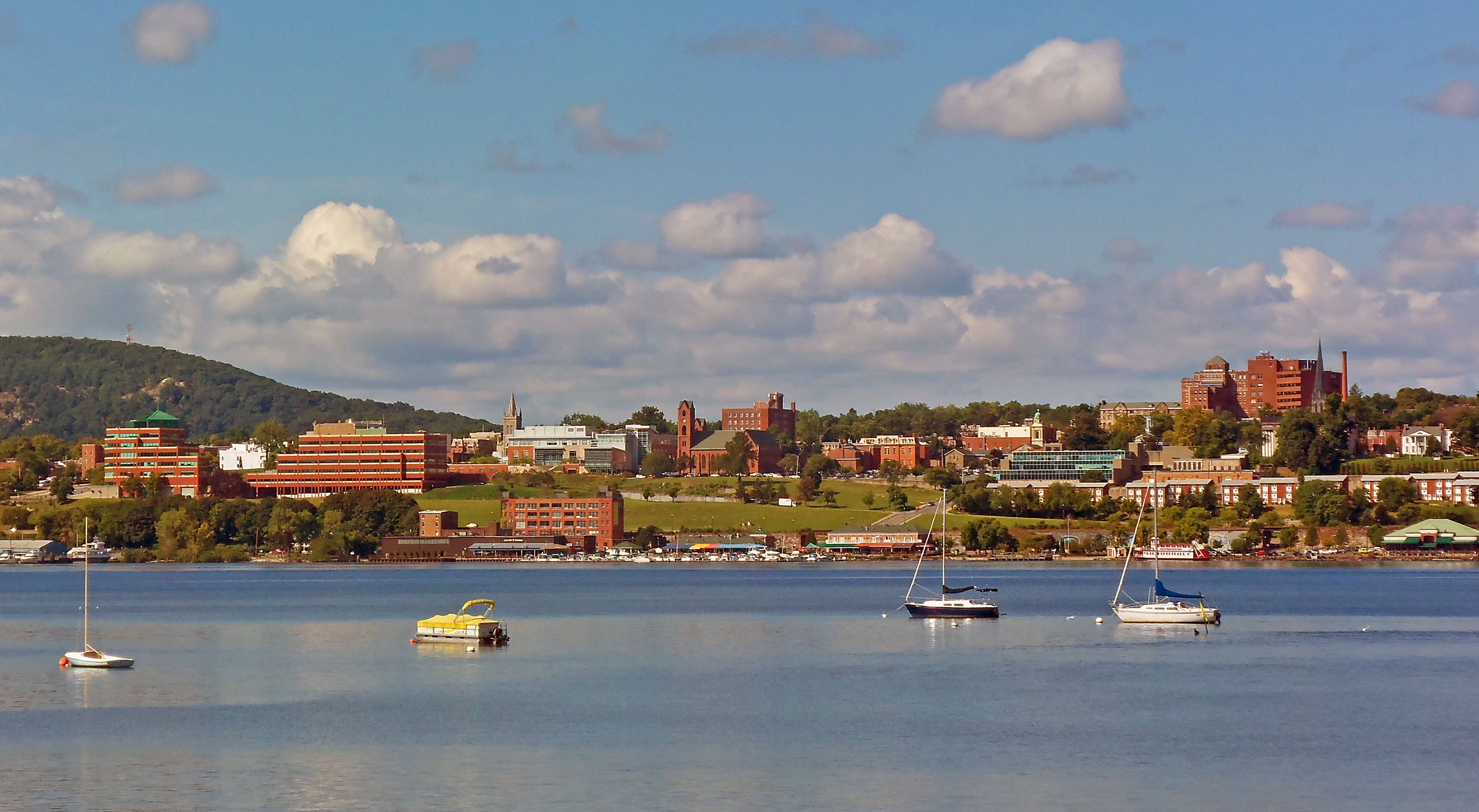
- Downtown Newburgh from Beacon, across the Hudson River

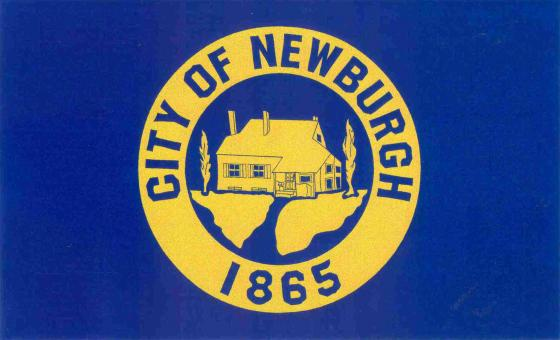
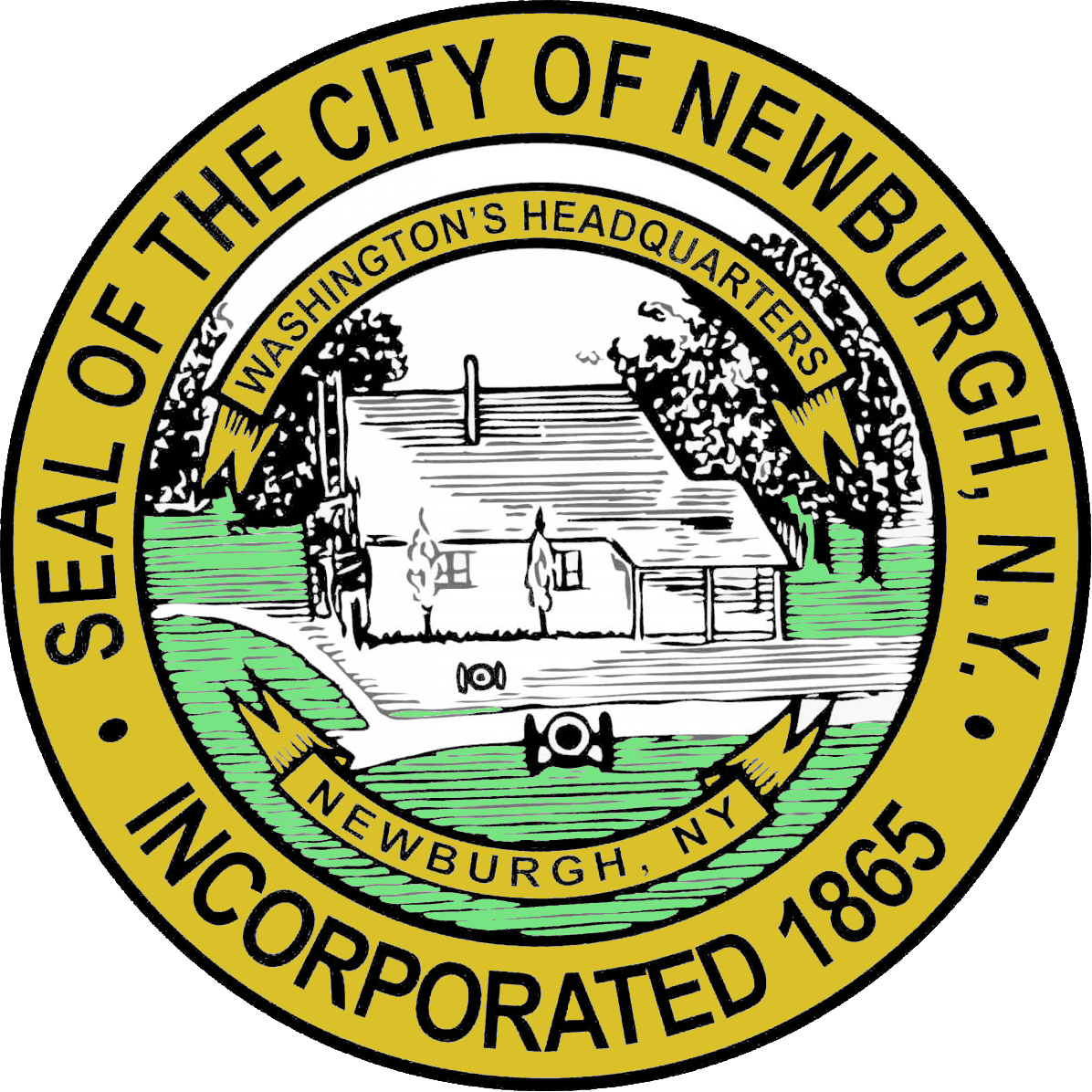
- Flag Seal

- Location in Orange County and the state of New York.

- Location within New York Location within the United States
- Coordinates: 41°30′0″N 74°0′36″W
- Country: United States
- State: New York
- County: Orange
- Settled: 1709; 317 years ago
- Village Incorporation: March 25, 1800; 226 years ago
- City incorporation: 1865; 161 years ago

Government
  - Type: Council–manager
  - City manager: Todd Venning
  - Mayor: Torrance Harvey (D)

Area
  - City: 4.78 sq mi (12.39 km^{2})
  - Land: 3.81 sq mi (9.86 km^{2})
  - Water: 0.98 sq mi (2.53 km^{2})
- Highest elevation: 690 ft (210 m)
- Lowest elevation: 0 ft (0 m)

Population (2020)
  - City: 28,856
  - Density: 7,581.5/sq mi (2,927.24/km^{2})
  - Metro: 711,730 (US: 84th)
- Demonym: Newburgian
- Time zone: UTC-5 (Eastern)
  - Summer (DST): UTC-4 (Eastern)
- ZIP Code: 12550
- Area code: 845
- FIPS code: 36-071-50034
- FIPS code: 36-50034
- Primary airport: Stewart International Airport
- Website: www.cityofnewburgh-ny.gov

Newburgh is a city in Orange County, New York, United States. With a population of 28,856 as of the 2020 census, it is a principal city of the Kiryas Joel–Poughkeepsie–Newburgh metropolitan area with an estimated 712,000 residents. Located 60 miles (97 km) north of New York City, and 90 miles (140 km) south of Albany on the Hudson River within the Hudson Valley Area, the city of Newburgh is located near Stewart International Airport, one of the primary airports for Downstate New York.

The Newburgh area was first settled in the early 18th century by the Germans and British. During the American Revolution, Newburgh served as the headquarters of the Continental Army. Prior to its chartering in 1865, the city of Newburgh was part of the town of Newburgh; the town now borders the city to the north and west. East of the city is the Hudson River; the city of Beacon is across the river and it is connected to Newburgh via the Newburgh–Beacon Bridge. The entire southern boundary of the city is with the town of New Windsor. Most of this boundary is formed by Quassaick Creek. In May 2016, the city requested help for its PFOS contaminated water supply under Superfund.

Newburgh is the location of numerous preserved landmarks, including Washington's Headquarters, the David Crawford House, New York State Armory, the Dutch Reformed Church, and Newburgh Colored Burial Ground. George Washington and Franklin Delano Roosevelt had ties to the city; Ulysses S. Grant, Robert F. Kennedy, and Theodore Roosevelt also visited, the latter delivering a famous speech at a nearby shipyard. The city served as a planning ground for the Gothic Revival architectural movement in America, headed by native Andrew Jackson Downing with English architects Calvert Vaux and Frederick Clarke Withers.

Mount Saint Mary College, a private liberal arts college, is located there.

== History ==
At the time of European contact the area of Newburgh was occupied by the Waoranek, a branch of the Lenape. The area that became Newburgh was first explored by Europeans when Henry Hudson stopped by during his 1609 expedition up the river that now bears his name. His navigator, Robert Juet, is said to have called the site "a pleasant place to build a town", although some later historians believe he may actually have been referring to the area where Cornwall-on-Hudson now stands.

Around 1683, provincial governor Thomas Dongan purchased the land from the Woaranek people. The first settlement was made in the spring of 1709 by fifty-four Palatine refugees, sponsored by Queen Anne of Great Britain. The settlers named it the Palatine Parish by Quassic. In 1743, a ferry at the foot of First Street had been established between Newburgh and Fishkill Landing (now Beacon, New York). In 1752, the land had been surveyed by Cadwallader Colden and named "Newburgh", perhaps after one of the Newburghs (there are two) in his father's native Scotland (Colden himself was born in Ireland). Shipyards were established and docks and warehouses lined the waterfront.

In April 1782, General George Washington made his headquarters at the farmhouse of the Hasbrouck family, making Newburgh the Continental Army's headquarters; he remained there until August 1783. This was Washington's longest stay at any of his over 160 headquarters. In March 1782, Washington received the famous Newburgh letter from Lewis Nicola, suggesting that he declare himself king of the United States, a suggestion he strongly rejected. In honor of that rejection, Kings Highway, the north–south street on which the Newburgh headquarters is located, was renamed Liberty Street. In March 1783, feeling embittered over their lack of payment from Congress, an anonymous letter circulated amongst the senior officers encamped at the nearby New Windsor Cantonment, calling for a meeting between the officers to decide what course of action to take against Congress; the letter advocated for an ultimatum stating that if peace was declared and the officers were still unpaid, they would refuse to disband the army — effectively a military mutiny against the civilian government. This letter began what is now known as the "Newburgh Conspiracy". After delivering the "Newburgh Address" and reading aloud a letter from Congressman Joseph Jones of Virginia, Washington was able to persuade his officers to stay loyal to Congress and to him. A month later, Washington delivered the Proclamation of the Cessation of Hostilities that announced the preliminary peace treaty with the United Kingdom, and ordering the army to officially stand down. This marked the effective end of the fighting of the American Revolution, exactly 8 years later to the day since the fighting began at the Battles of Lexington and Concord. The Hasbrouck House was purchased by New York State in 1850 to preserve the site, making it the very first publicly owned historic site in the United States.

=== Growth ===
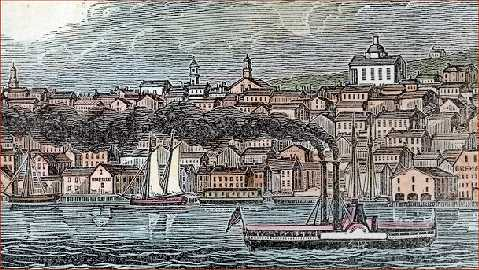
Woodcut of Newburgh in 1842, when the Dutch Reformed Church, had its original dome and lantern

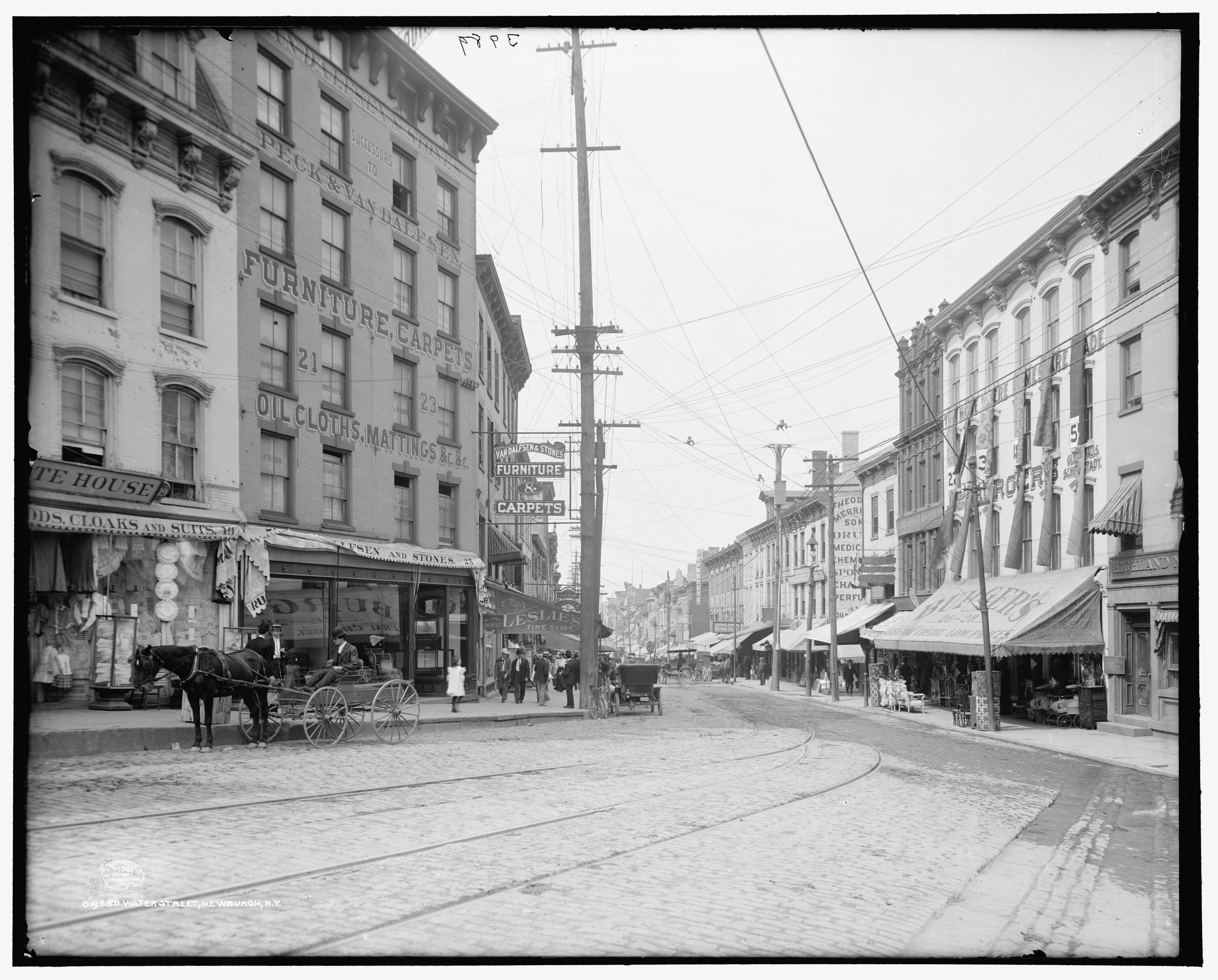
Water Street c. 1906; the buildings were demolished in urban renewal efforts of the 1960s and 1970s.

In 1793, Newburgh's first newspaper, The Newburgh Packet, was established. The hamlet of Newburgh was incorporated as a village in 1800. At the time of its settlement it was in Ulster County and was that county's seat. When Rockland County was split from Orange County in 1798, Newburgh and the other towns north of Moodna Creek were put in a redrawn Orange County. Newburgh thus lost its status as the county seat to Goshen, but as a political compromise supreme court sessions continued to be heard in Newburgh as well as the county seat of Goshen, the only place in New York State this is permitted. Although technically still permitted by statute, this practice was discontinued in the mid-1960s. The former County courthouse still stands as Newburgh's old city courthouse building (currently used as municipal office space).

By 1793 there were four sloop lines operating out of Newburgh. As new turnpikes opened trade extended into the interior, passenger coaches and farm wagons raveled as far west as Canandaigua. This was the shortest route from the Hudson to Western New York. By 1819 a steamboat on Cayuga Lake connected Newburgh stage lines with Ithaca. Streets leading to the river were often blocked for hours with farmers' wagons waiting to be unloaded at the wharves. With the opening of the Erie Canal much of the traffic from the Southern Tier was diverted. In 1830 Richard Carpenter of Newburgh had the steamboat William Young built at Low Point; it ran between Newburgh and Albany. Prosperity returned with the arrival of the railroads.

On the evening of September 24, 1824, beacon fires in the Hudson Highlands announced the arrival of the Marquis de Lafayette. Having been feted in New York, he sailed upriver on the chartered steamer James Kent. The next day, people came from the surrounding towns to catch a glimpse of the general as he made his way to a reception at the Orange Hotel. The Rev. John Brown of St. George's Episcopal Church was part of the welcoming committee. At 2 am., Lafayette sailed from Reeve & Falls dock for Poughkeepsie.

The Erie Railroad charter was amended April 8, 1845, to allow the building of the Newburgh Branch, running from the main line near Greycourt northeast to Newburgh, also on the Hudson River. The branch opened January 8, 1850. It was later used as a connection to the New York and New England Railroad via a car float operation across the river to Beacon, New York.

Newburgh was chartered as a city in April 1865.

Newburgh became quite prosperous during the Gilded Age that followed. Newburgh had telephone service in 1879. In 1883 there was a steamboat landing on Second Street. The United States Hotel was on Front Street opposite the landing. Also on Front Street near the landing was the Union Depot. In 1883, the West Shore Railroad inaugurated service to the Pennsylvania Railroad Depot at Jersey City and by 1886 was traveling to Weehawken Terminal, where passengers transferred to ferries to Manhattan.

With its situation on the Hudson River, midway between New York City and Albany, it became a transportation hub and an industrial center. Its industries included the manufacturing of cottons, woolens, silks, paper, felt hats, baking powder, soap, paper boxes, brick, plush goods, steam boilers, tools, automobiles, coin silver, bleach, candles, waterway gates, ice machines, pumps, moving-picture screens, overalls, perfumes, furniture, carpets, carburetors, spiral springs, spiral pipe, shirt waists, shirts, felt goods, lawn mowers; shipyards; foundries and machine shops; tanneries; leatherette works; and plaster works.

J. J. Nutt said of Newburgh:

The year 1891 finds us the most thriving city on the Hudson, with citizens full of spirit of public enterprise, with public institutions comparatively unequalled, and with apparently every factor and requisite to ensure its bright future as a manufacturing and commercial city of importance...

— J. J. Nutt

Newburgh was home to the second Edison power plant, which installed and powered 126 lamps at the Orange Woolen Mill, and was the second American city (after New York's Pearl Street) to have a street lit using electricity. Broadway, which at 132 feet (40 m) in width is one of the widest streets in the state of New York, runs through the city culminating with views of the Hudson River.

=== 20th and 21st centuries ===
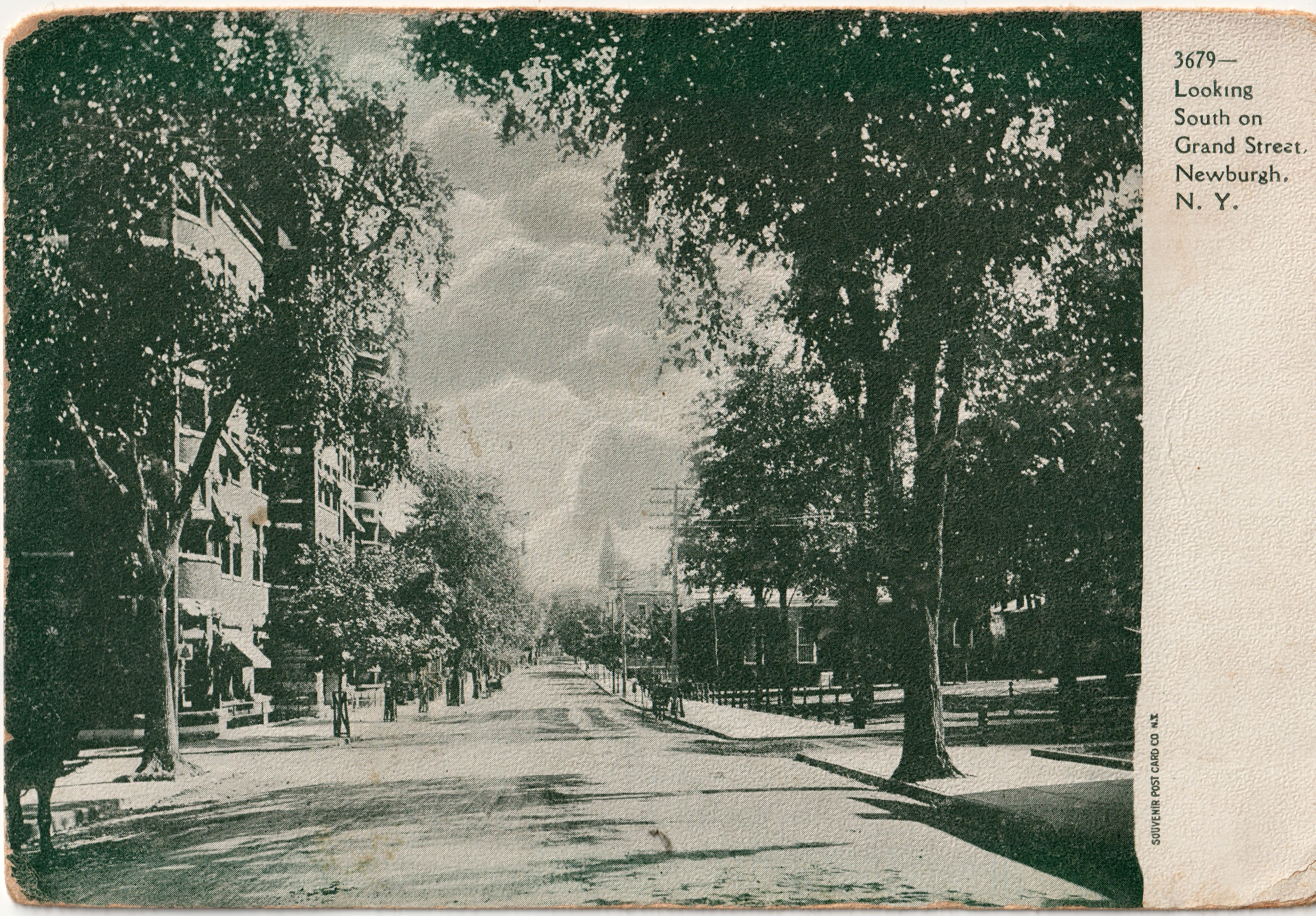
Looking South on Grand Street, early 20th century

Newburgh played a pivotal role in television history. In October 1939, RCA chose to test-market televisions in Newburgh, which was within range of the television signal of RCA's experimental station W2XBS. Six hundred sets were sold in Newburgh at a deep discount. The test-marketing campaign's success encouraged RCA to go forward with developing the new medium. Additionally, with consumer television production ceasing during World War II, those Newburgh households which purchased televisions during 1939 and 1940 were among the few to enjoy television (albeit with a greatly reduced programming schedule) during the war.

Newburgh was one of the first cities in the country to fluoridate its water in 1945.

In the late 20th century the industrial base of the city declined as industries relocated operations south or to other locations with cheaper labor costs and lower taxes. The Hudson River, which previously served as the main means of transporting goods, lost much of its shipping traffic to trucking. The city's trolley system was shut down in 1924 in favor of buses. The nation moved to the automobile for transportation and, as with many other cities, there was a resulting migration to the suburbs. In 1963 the Newburgh–Beacon Bridge was opened, carrying Interstate 84 and spanning the Hudson River, bypassing the Newburgh waterfront and the city of Newburgh altogether. The ferry closed down soon thereafter—it was not revived until 2005—and the waterfront area declined rapidly.

In 1962, Lloyd's Department Store became the first major shopping center in Newburgh. Its motto was "Years Ahead". Many features of Lloyd's, including widely divergent ministores under one roof, did not become common in other shopping centers for many decades. Lloyd's successfully drew a great deal of retail business away from the downtown area. In 1964, the Mid Valley Mall opened, also outside of the city limits in Newburgh, and attracted many long-established local businesses away from the waterfront and downtown city of Newburgh. Other retail shopping malls soon sprang up, all also outside the city of Newburgh, and the retail industry of the city declined further. The city continued to lose its previously well regarded retail sector along Water Street and Broadway to the suburban shopping malls, which did not share the city's congested parking and traffic problems or the perceived rising crime rate.

In the late 1960s and early 1970s, the city's response to the economic decline was an ambitious urban renewal plan. The city's historic waterfront area, an area composed of several square blocks which included numerous historically significant buildings, was completely demolished between 1970 and 1973. Residents were relocated, or were supposed to be relocated, to newer housing projects around Muchattoes Lake in the city's interior.

A grand complex that was planned for the urban renewal area was never built when state and federal spending began to dry up after the 1973 oil crisis. To this day, the blocks which slope down to the river remain open, grassy slopes, offering sweeping views of the Hudson but generating no property taxes for the city. Public sentiment is mixed on whether they should be built on again at all, and the city's view-protection ordinances make it less likely. Below, the waterfront was developed in the late 1990s after the city was once again able to secure grants from the state's Environmental Protection fund for riprap to stabilize the shoreline.

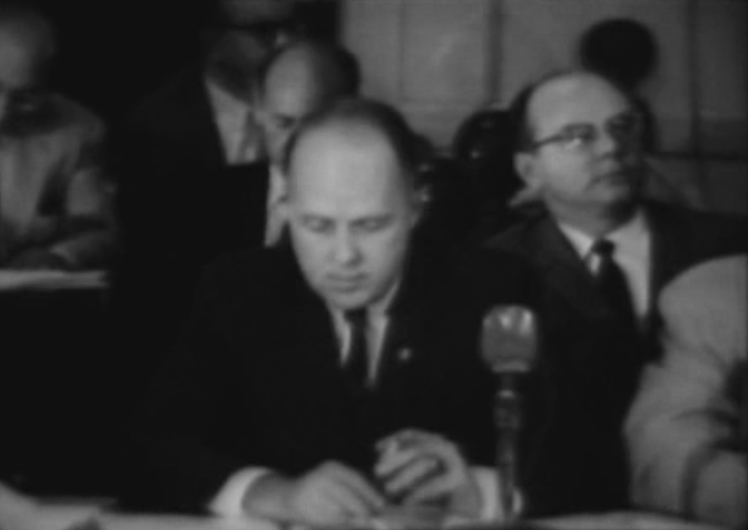
City manager Joseph Mitchell attending the Newburgh City Council in 1961

In the early 1960s, city manager Joseph McDowell Mitchell and the council attracted nationwide attention when they attempted to require welfare recipients to pick up their payments at police headquarters. Mitchell later announced a program that would have denied welfare payments after three months except to the aged, the blind and the handicapped. After opposition by both state and federal officials, the program created a national controversy and never went into effect.

Newburgh in the early 21st century is more racially diverse than previously, with a growing Latin American immigrant population (mainly of Mexican descent) in addition to the city's sizable African American demographic.

== Geography ==
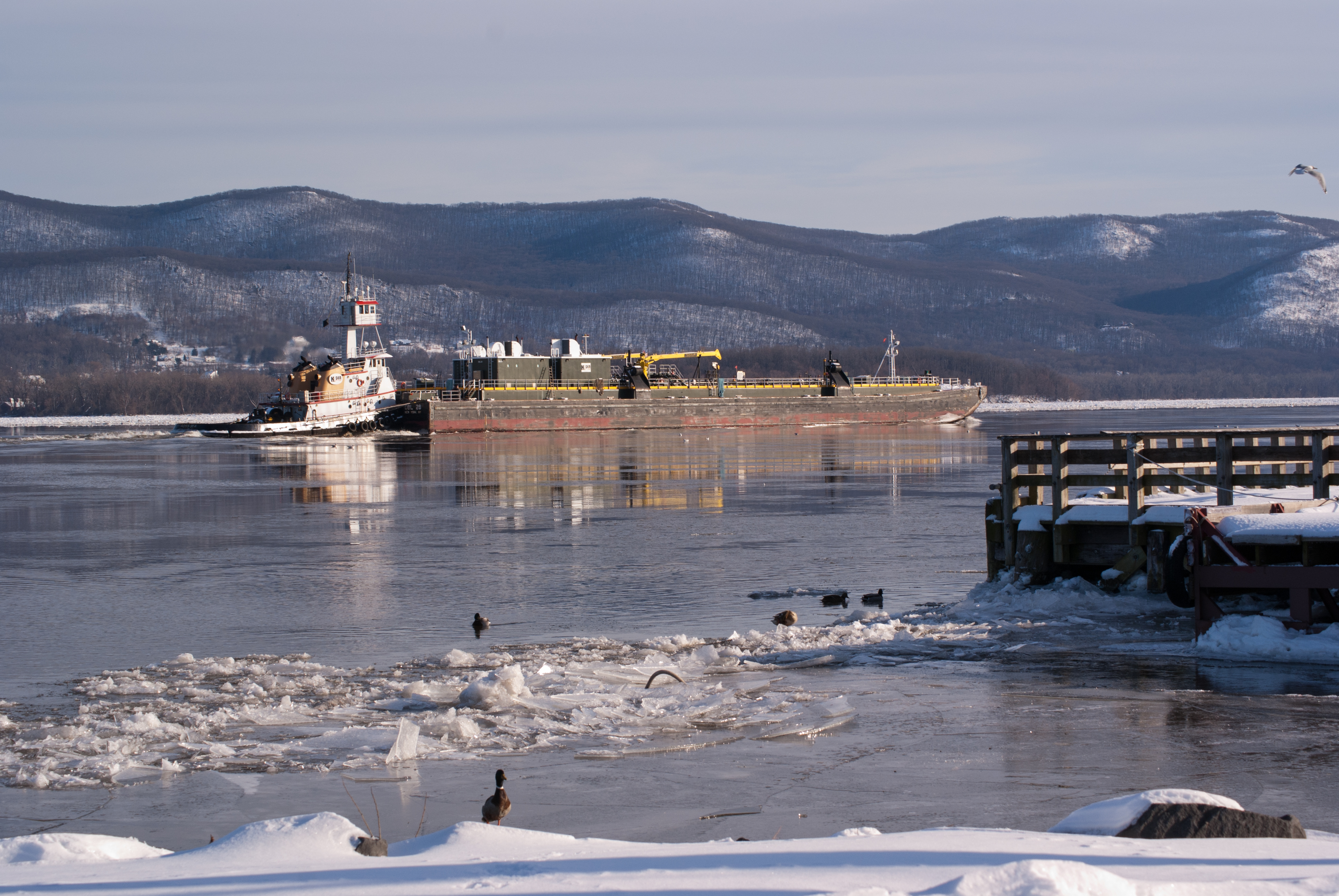
Barge in frozen Newburgh Bay, 2011

Newburgh is situated in the Northeastern United States, in Downstate New York's Hudson Valley region. It is located within Orange County bordering the Hudson River on the west bank. The town of Newburgh borders the city to the north and west, and the town of New Windsor borders the south.

Adjacent to Newburgh, the land rises at first sharply to a bluff, where many historic structures are located, offering sweeping views of the Hudson Highlands to the south; Mount Beacon to the east and the Newburgh—Beacon Bridge to the north; then more gradually to a relatively level western half. There are some notable hills in outlying areas such as the Washington Heights section in southeast Newburgh and Mount St. Mary's at the northeast. The lowest elevation in the city is at sea level along the river; the highest is roughly 690 feet (210 m) on Snake Hill along the city's boundary with the town of New Windsor.

According to the United States Census Bureau, the city is located at the following coordinates: (41.503193, −74.019636). According to the U.S. Census Bureau, Newburgh has a total area of 4.8 sq mi (12.4 km^{2}), of which 3.8 sq mi (9.9 km^{2}) is land and 0.97 sq mi (2.5 km^{2}) (20.08%) is water. Newburgh makes up a part of the Kiryas Joel-Poughkeepsie-Newburgh metropolitan area, which is a part of the larger New York metropolitan area.

=== Climate ===
The city of Newburgh lies in the transitional zone between humid subtropical and humid continental climates under the Köppen climate classification.

Annually, according to Sperling's BestPlaces, the city receives an average of 191 sunny days. Winters are cold and damp, and the city of Newburgh may receive up to 36.8 inches (934.72 mm) of snowfall. The months of January and February are the coldest months of the year with an average low of 18 degrees Fahrenheit or -7.7 Celsius. February is also the driest month. Summers tend to be hot and humid, with an average high of 84 °F (28.8 °C) in July. June, August, and September are the most comfortable months according to Sperling's BestPlaces. Newburgh receives approximately 47 inches (1,193.8 mm) of rainfall annually.

Climate data for Newburgh, New York (Stewart International Airport)
Month	Jan	Feb	Mar	Apr	May	Jun	Jul	Aug	Sep	Oct	Nov	Dec	Year
Record high °F (°C)	71 (22)	75 (24)	87 (31)	96 (36)	97 (36)	102 (39)	103 (39)	103 (39)	105 (41)	91 (33)	82 (28)	75 (24)	105 (41)
Mean daily maximum °F (°C)	35 (2)	39 (4)	48 (9)	61 (16)	71 (22)	80 (27)	85 (29)	83 (28)	75 (24)	63 (17)	51 (11)	40 (4)	61 (16)
Mean daily minimum °F (°C)	18 (−8)	20 (−7)	28 (−2)	38 (3)	48 (9)	57 (14)	61 (16)	60 (16)	53 (12)	45 (7)	33 (1)	22 (−6)	40 (5)
Record low °F (°C)	−22 (−30)	−18 (−28)	−3 (−19)	15 (−9)	27 (−3)	38 (3)	45 (7)	40 (4)	29 (−2)	19 (−7)	8 (−13)	−13 (−25)	−22 (−30)
Average precipitation inches (mm)	3.66 (93)	3.20 (81)	3.89 (99)	4.13 (105)	4.11 (104)	4.56 (116)	4.59 (117)	4.61 (117)	4.47 (114)	4.99 (127)	4.33 (110)	4.20 (107)	50.74 (1,289)
Source: The Weather Channel

== Demographics ==
Historical population
Census	Pop.	Note	%±
1860	12,578		—
1870	17,014		35.3%
1880	18,049		6.1%
1890	23,087		27.9%
1900	24,943		8.0%
1910	27,805		11.5%
1920	30,366		9.2%
1930	31,275		3.0%
1940	31,883		1.9%
1950	31,956		0.2%
1960	30,979		−3.1%
1970	26,219		−15.4%
1980	23,438		−10.6%
1990	26,454		12.9%
2000	28,259		6.8%
2010	28,866		2.1%
2020	28,856		0.0%
U.S. Decennial Census

=== 2020 census ===
As of the 2020 census, Newburgh had a population of 28,856. The median age was 31.7 years. 27.8% of residents were under the age of 18 and 10.0% of residents were 65 years of age or older. For every 100 females there were 93.3 males, and for every 100 females age 18 and over there were 90.5 males age 18 and over.

100.0% of residents lived in urban areas, while 0.0% lived in rural areas.

There were 9,771 households in Newburgh, of which 41.0% had children under the age of 18 living in them. Of all households, 29.5% were married-couple households, 24.2% were households with a male householder and no spouse or partner present, and 37.2% were households with a female householder and no spouse or partner present. About 28.4% of all households were made up of individuals and 9.8% had someone living alone who was 65 years of age or older.

There were 11,099 housing units, of which 12.0% were vacant. The homeowner vacancy rate was 2.3% and the rental vacancy rate was 6.4%.

Racial composition as of the 2020 census
Race	Number	Percent
White	6,554	22.7%
Black or African American	8,167	28.3%
American Indian and Alaska Native	656	2.3%
Asian	260	0.9%
Native Hawaiian and Other Pacific Islander	24	0.1%
Some other race	9,737	33.7%
Two or more races	3,458	12.0%
Hispanic or Latino (of any race)	15,085	52.3%

=== 2018 American Community Survey ===
According to the five-year American Community Survey estimates for 2018, 42.0% of households had one or more people under 18 years and 30.4% had one or more people aged 60 and older living. The average household size was 2.92. In 2018, there were 5,752 families with an average family size of 3.8. Among unmarried-partner households, 0.9% were same-sex and 9.4% were opposite sex.

55.4% of the city only spoke English and 44.6% spoke a language other than English. 41.5% understood Spanish in 2018 and 2.6% spoke another Indo-European language. 0.3% spoke Pacific Islander languages.

The median income for a household from 2014 to 2018 was $37,900 and the mean income was $53,772. 51.5% were below the poverty level and 84.5% were at or above the poverty level. Despite progress from the early 1990s, poverty remained a significant problem. The 2000 census found that two of the city's five census tracts were among the poorest in the entire state. In 2004 the state declared it one of the state's five most "stressed" cities, based on a mix of statistics like families headed by single mothers, abandoned buildings, unemployment, residents under the poverty line and adults without a high school diploma.

=== Religion ===
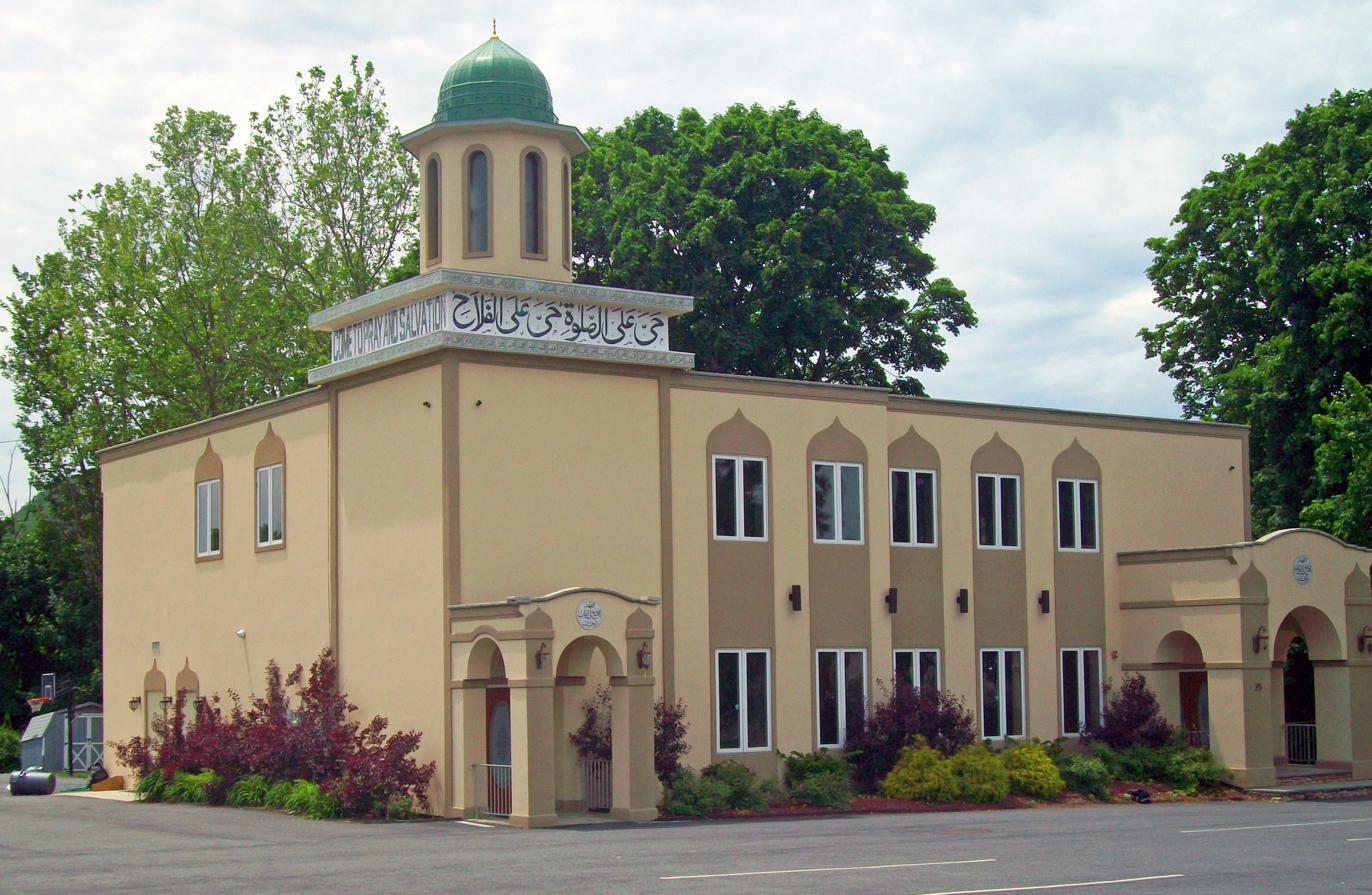
Masjid al-Ikhlas, where the 2009 New York City bomb plot was hatched

According to Sperling's BestPlaces, 53.5% of Newburghers are religious. The largest Christian denomination in the city is the Catholic Church (35.7%), served by the Roman Catholic Archdiocese of New York. 2.1% of Christians profess Methodism, 1.9% are Presbyterian, 1.2% Lutheran, 1.1 Pentecostal, 1.0% Anglican or Episcopalian, 0.5% Baptist, and 0.4% from the Latter-Day Saint movement. 1.7% are of another Christian faith which may consist of the Eastern Orthodox Church and others. The second largest religious demographic are adherents to Judaism. Jews form 6.5% of the Newburgher faith community. The Jewish Federation of Orange County is headquartered in the city and Congregation Agudas Israel and Temple Beth Jacob are located in the city limits. 1.1% of the faith community follow Islam and 0.2% are members of an eastern religion including Hinduism, Buddhism, or Sikhism.

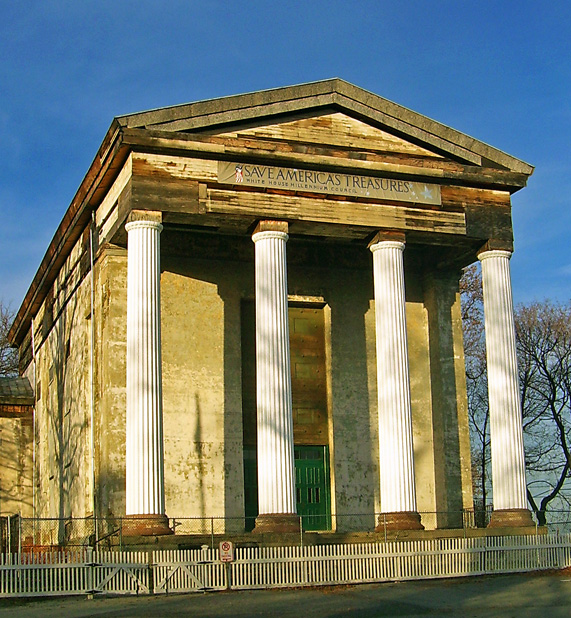
The Dutch Reformed Church, a National Historic Landmark

==== St. George's Episcopal Church ====
In 1728 the Rev. Richard Charlton was sent from England to be a missionary to the people of New Windsor in then Ulster County (later Newburgh in Orange County). St. George's Church developed from St. Thomas' Church in New Windsor. In 1770, during the tenure of the Rev. John Sayre, St. George's Church was granted a royal charter by King George III. The Rev. Mr. Sayres left for Canada at the time of the Revolution. In 1790 Rev George Spierin served as both minister and schoolmaster, but resigned in 1793. St. George's Church was re-established in 1805. In 1838 the Rev Dr. John Brown organized St. George's Cemetery, open to members of any race, religion or belief. He was also a founder of St. Luke's Hospital. Originally, services were held in the old Glebe schoolhouse until the church was built in 1819. In 1834 the bell tower was added. Dr. Brown was succeeded by his assistant, Rev. Octavius Applegate who founded the mission chapel, of the Good Shepherd.

==== St. Patrick's Roman Catholic Church ====
The first Catholic service in Newburgh took place around 1816 when Mass was said in the house of Henry Gilmore on Western Avenue (now Broadway) by Rev. James McKenna. He was followed in 1817 by Rev. Ffrench. A church was formed in 1826, served by circuit-riding missionaries. Rev. Philip O'Reilly made Newburgh the base from which he served other communities. St. Patrick's Church was founded in 1836. Fr. Patrick Duffy was the first pastor and served for seventeen years until his death in 1853. He was followed by Rev. Gallagher, who was succeeded by Rev. Edward J. O'Reilly. Father O'Reilly was followed by Father Broidy. A stone church building was completed in December 1842 and formally dedicated by Bishop John Hughes of New York in 1849. In 1852 land was purchased for a cemetery at the corner of First and Stone streets. The rectory was built in 1854. The parish established in 1855 a Library Association, later known as the Young Men's Catholic Lyceum. In 1881 a new building was erected for the Lyceum on Liberty Street.

In 1879 Right Rev. Monsignor J.F. Mooney became pastor and started the mission of St. Joseph's in New Windsor. He also founded Calvary Cemetery which opened on May 30, 1898.

St. Patrick's began its Hispanic ministry in the mid-1960s. In 1966 Father John Filippelli of the Society of Saint Joseph of the Sacred Heart initiated a Spanish Mass as well as cultural celebrations such as the Feast of Three Kings. In 1973, Fr. Rogelio Cuesta, OP was named Director of the Hispanic Apostolate of Newburgh and Beacon. Other patronal feasts were celebrated such as Our Lady of Charity from Cuba, Señor de los Milagros of Peru, and Our Lady of Suyapa of Honduras, reflecting the diversity of the community. In 1989 the ministry was expanded to include outreach to migrant workers.

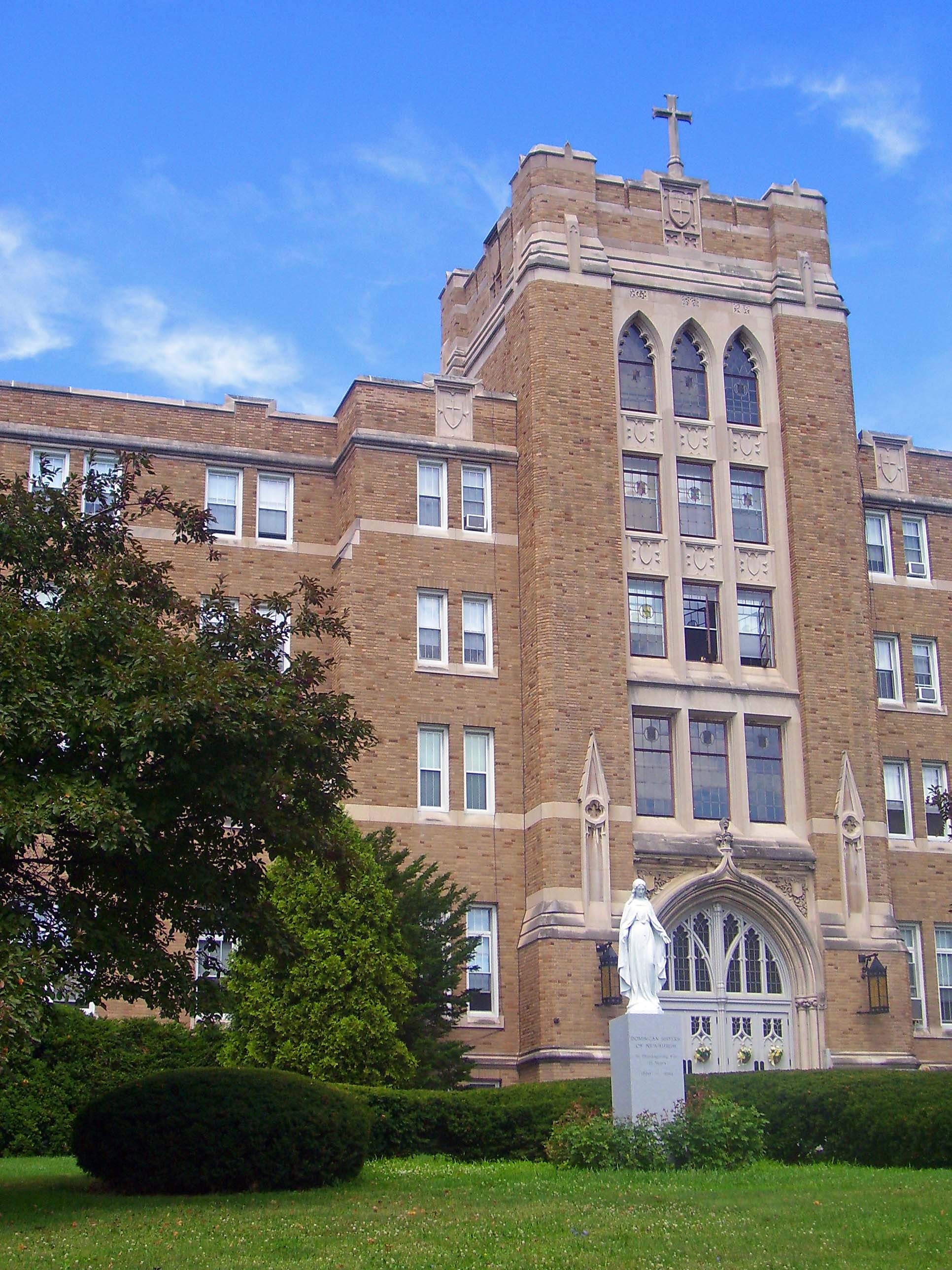
Mount St. Mary's Motherhouse, 2007

==== St. Mary's Roman Catholic Church ====
St. Mary's Church was founded in 1875, when the archbishop, John McCloskey divided the original parish creating Mary's parish in the northern part. The first mass in the parish was on Easter Sunday, 1875, in the opera-house. In 1880 the building occupied by the church until 2015 was erected at Gidney Avenue and South Street. In 1883 Mount Saint Mary College was founded. In 1884 St. Mary's Parochial School opened on September 1, 1886.

St. Mary's Parish was merged with St. Patrick's effective August 1, 2015. The church building was shuttered and closed and has not been used since that date.

=== Crime ===
Newburgh was ranked more dangerous than 95 percent of US cities by website NeighborhoodScout, based on 2012 FBI crime data. This group also ranked Newburgh as the tenth most dangerous place to live in the United States based on the same 2012 dataset. It was ranked at number 12 in the previous year's rankings.

In 2010, The New York Times wrote an extensive article on gang activity in Newburgh.

In 2014, Newburgh began implementing a program called "Group Violence Intervention," an example of focused deterrence. In 2017, Newburgh reported the lowest crime rates in 10 years.

== Economy ==
Newburgh was once a major economic hub between New York City and the New York State capital of Albany. Partly due to suburbanization and other economic factors the city suffered an economic decline from the 1960s to first quarter of the 21st century. Currently over 11,400 residents are employed within the city limits.

The largest industries as of 2020 were retail, healthcare and social assistance, food services, finance, public administration, and educational services.

== Arts and culture ==
=== Preservation ===
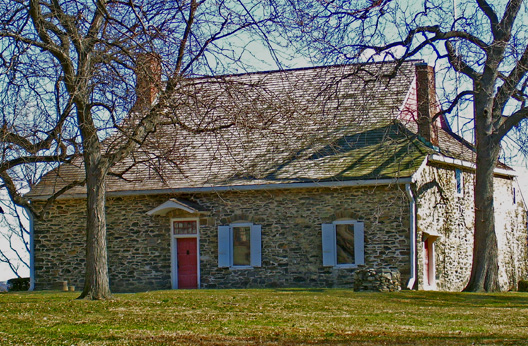
Washington's Headquarters State Historic Site

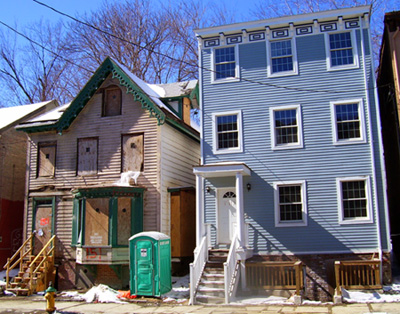
Two homes on Chambers Street, one of them newly renovated, in 2006

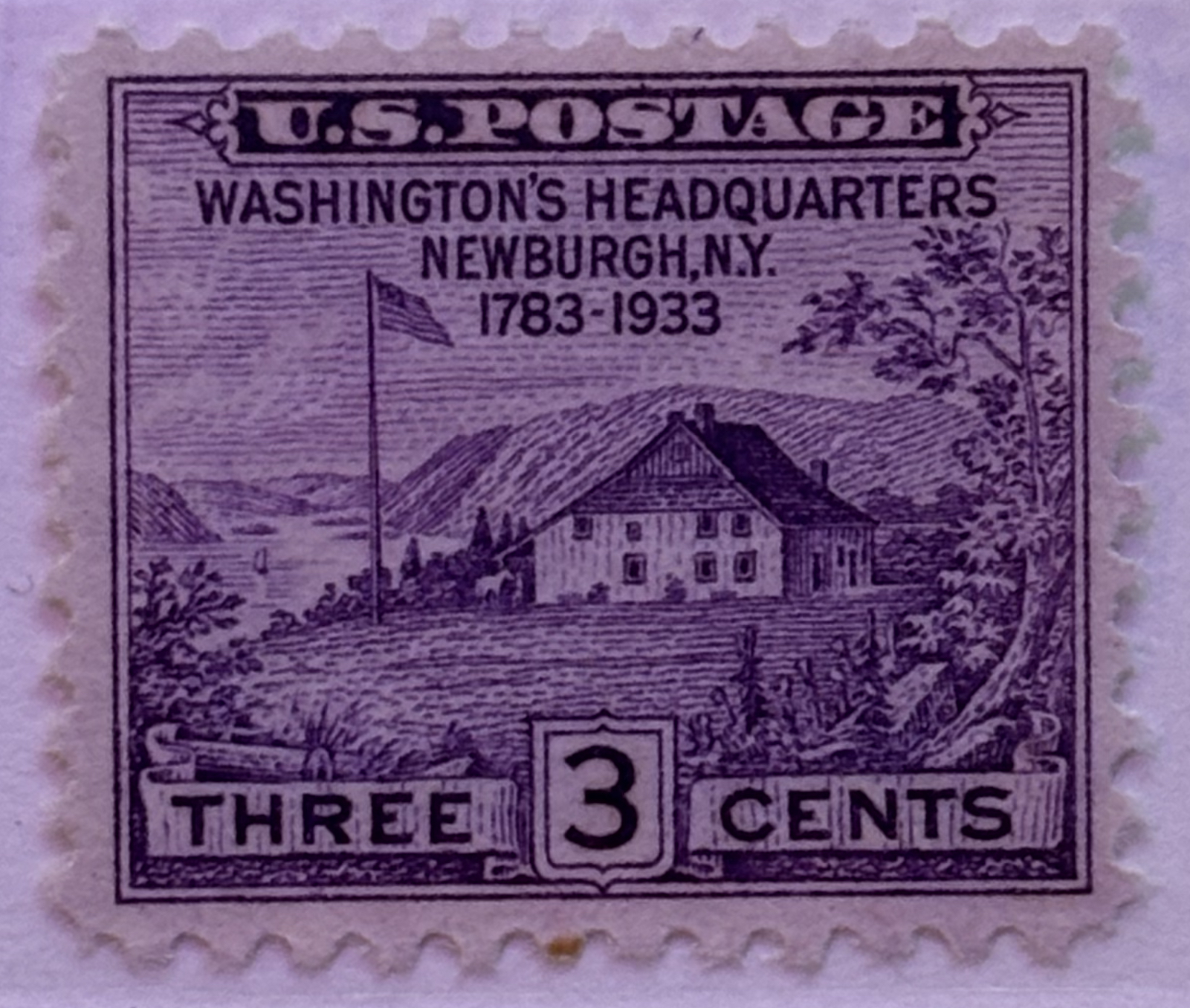
US Stamp SC #752 Front Washington's Headquarters 1933

Newburgh's preservation history can be traced all the way back to 1850 when Washington's Headquarters was designated a state historic site, the first in the country. The Historical Society of Newburgh Bay and the Highlands was chartered by the State of New York and incorporated in 1884. The David Crawford House on Montgomery Street, built in 1830, is the current home of the Historical Society of Newburgh Bay and the Highlands.

The city's modern preservation efforts began when the Dutch Reformed Church, a Greek Revival structure designed by Alexander Jackson Davis, was slated for demolition as part of urban renewal after the congregation left the building in 1967. The movement to stop it led to the development of a historic district, now the second largest in New York State. The church was added to the National Register of Historic Places three years later, and in 2001 became the city's second National Historic Landmark after Washington's Headquarters.

The city was designated a Preserve America community in 2005 and it also signed an agreement with the State Office of Historic Preservation as a Certified Local Government community. Its East End Historic District, recognized by the National Register of Historic Places as that and the Montgomery-Grand-Liberty Streets Historic District, has the most contributing properties of any historic district in the state.

The city's historic architecture, featuring designs by Alexander Jackson Davis, Calvert Vaux, Andrew Jackson Downing, Frederick Clarke Withers, George E. Harney, John H. Duncan, J. A. Wood, Warren and Wetmore, James Riely Gordon, and McKim, Mead & White have attracted a stable core of preservation-minded community activists willing to invest, spend time, and money in renovating property. Other notable native architects include Thornton MacNess Niven, ancestor of playwright Thornton Wilder, Elkanah K. Shaw, Frank E. Estabrook, known for his civic buildings and J. Percy Hanford who inherited Estabrook's practice, located at 75 Second Street, after his death in 1918.

=== Public historic sites ===
- Old Town Cemetery — The city's first burying ground and religious site, with gravestones dating to the mid 18th century. Features a unique Egyptian Revival tomb thought to be designed by Davis.
- Newburgh Colored Burial Ground — Former site of a Black cemetery, destroyed around the turn of the 20th century. Construction in a parking lot prompted an archeological dig, which revealed possibly hundreds of remains.
- St. George's Cemetery — An early planned rural cemetery situated in the city's East End, with several notable interments. Maintained by St. George's Episcopal Church, the oldest continually-operating church in the city.
- Washington's Headquarters State Historic Site — Headquarters of George Washington during the end of the Revolutionary War, and home of the Huguenot Hasbrouck family. It is the first publicly owned historic site in the United States.
- David Crawford House — Headquarters of the Historical Society of Newburgh Bay and the Highlands, who use the house as a museum and library. Built by David Crawford, a freighter and merchant who contributed to the development of the city.
- Downing Park — A Vaux-Olmstead-designed public park given to the memory of Downing. Features pathways similar to Central Park, with a small pond, cafe, amphitheatre, and pergola designed by Estabrook on the foundation of an 18th-century farmhouse.

== Sports ==
Delano-Hitch formerly served as the home field for the Newburgh Black Diamonds and Newburgh Nighthawks baseball teams.

The Hudson Valley Renegades are a minor league baseball team affiliated with the New York Yankees. The team is a member of the New York–Penn League, and play at Dutchess Stadium in nearby Fishkill.

The Hudson Valley Highlanders of the North American Football League played their home games at Dietz Stadium in nearby Kingston.

== Government ==
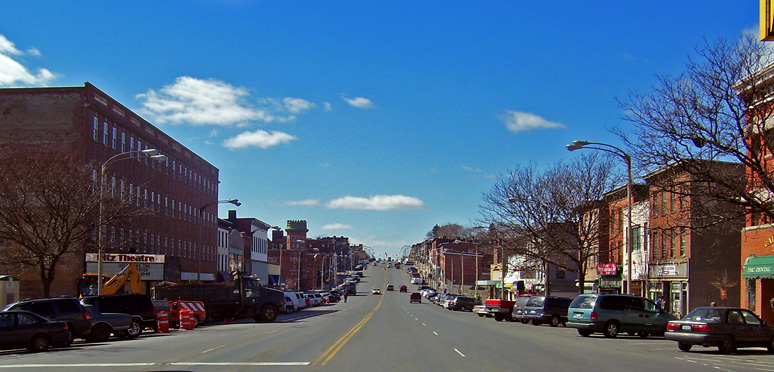
Lower Broadway, 2006

Newburgh has seven elected officials, a mayor and six city council members, four elected by ward to four-year terms, staggered so that the mayor and two at-large councilmembers are up for re-election one year and four others, by ward, two years later. It was anticipated that in November 2007, Newburgh voters would decide on whether to split Newburgh into eight wards and elect one councilmember from each ward. The Newburgh City Council voted to disallow this referendum from appearing on the ballot pending further public input.

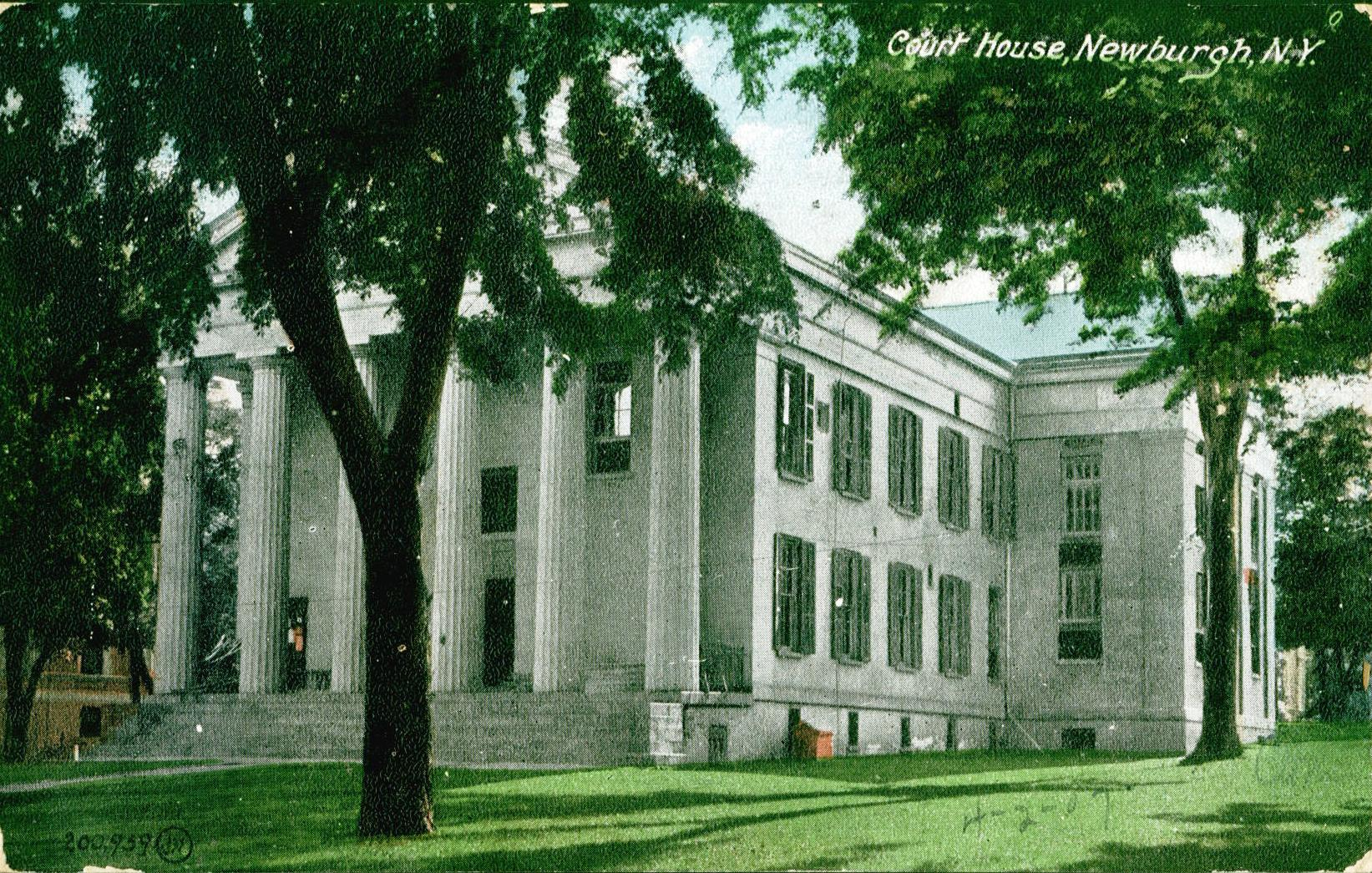
Newburgh Court House, 1907

In 1915 it became one of the first American cities to delegate routine governmental authority to a city manager. The mayor accepts all legal process and often serves as the symbolic head of the city, but other than that has no special powers or role. The city manager, who appoints all other city officials subject to council approval, serves at their pleasure. Since the position was created, there have been 33 managers who have served an average tenure of 2.7 years, with John Fogarty holding the longevity record at eight years in the 1950s. His term ended with his dismissal, as did eight others.

In January 2009, Jean Anne McGrane, the first woman to hold the position, was fired for, among other issues, withholding an unfavorable federal report on the city's mishandling of two HUD grants from the city council in the midst of the consideration of a $6 million bond, the 2009 city budget and the 2009 CDBG funds.

The city has had five mayors and eight city managers (five if two who served twice are counted only once) since 2000. Two subsequent acting city managers, after McGrane, quit. Richard Herbek, the third acting manager, took the job months later. He resigned in 2013 amid reports that he had misrepresented an encounter with a prostitute the year before. The (former) police chief, Michael Ferrara, replaced him on an interim basis. Michael G. Ciaravino was appointed City Manager of Newburgh on May 19, 2014, by unanimous vote of the City Council.

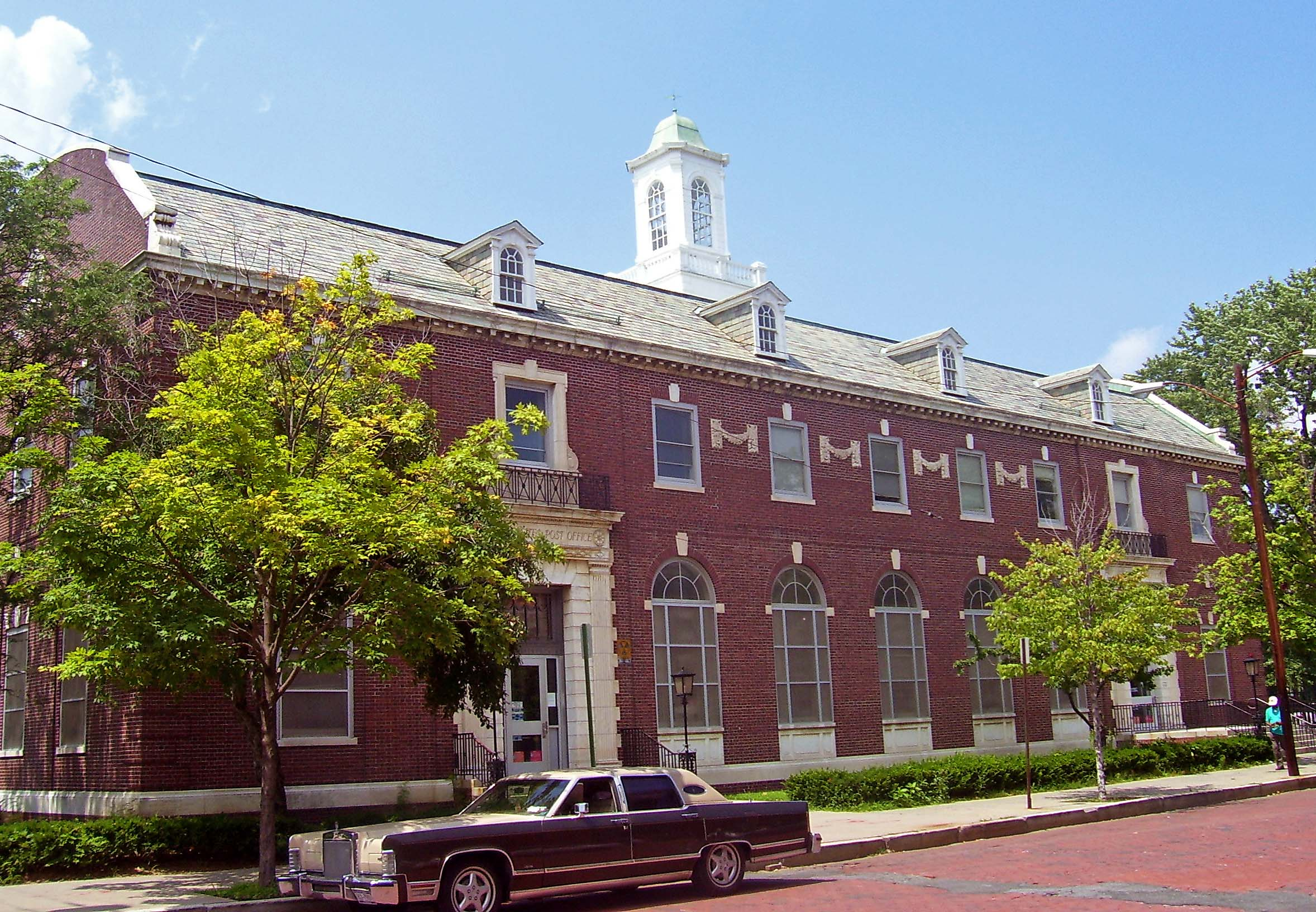
Newburgh U.S. Post Office, 2007

In April 2018, Judy Kennedy, who was elected Newburgh's mayor in 2011, died of ovarian cancer at the age of 73, leaving the office vacant until her successor Torrance Harvey was appointed the following month.

Newburgh is in the 18 Congressional District.

=== Politics ===
Tensions flared during the city's hotly contested 1995 mayoral election. Allegations of electoral fraud had dogged the city's first African American woman mayor, Audrey Carey, since her 1991 victory in a four-way race. Supporters of Republican candidate Regina Angelo alleged that many registered voters in neighborhoods Carey had carried heavily used false addresses. In response, four years later deputy sheriffs were stationed at polling places and challenged voters to provide proof of residency and identity. Although she won, Carey's supporters claimed that the deputy sheriffs had singled out minority voters for such challenges, and accused the Republicans of voter suppression. These tensions were only aggravated when the council selected the city's Republican chairman at the time, Harry Porr, as the new city manager. Carey was defeated by Tyrone Crabb, a black man running on the Republican line, in 1999. Porr was fired, rehired and fired again in 2001. Crabb died suddenly of a heart attack ten days before he was slated to take office. The vacancy was filled by his widow, Mary.

Despite demographics and urban trends favoring Democrats, the voters of the city had until recent years regularly voted across party lines. Nicholas Valentine, mayor from 2003 until 2011 and several other recent mayors and council members were Republicans. The late Thomas Kirwan—a resident who served in the New York State Assembly until 2008—and was re-elected in a successful comeback bid in 2010, by one of the smallest margins in state history (15 votes), was a Republican. He died late in 2011. On March 20, a special election was held to fill the vacancy in which former Assemblyman Frank Skartados, Democrat, won by a large margin. In the general election held in November 2011, a newcomer to the city named Judith Kennedy was overwhelmingly elected Mayor over incumbent Republican Councilwoman Christine Bello. In addition, the Democratic candidates for Council seats, Gay Lee and Cedric Brown, were also overwhelmingly elected. Accordingly, the council is now 5–0 Democrat—the first time in recorded history one party monopolizes the Newburgh city government.

An independent documentary was made in 2004 about the mayoral race in Newburgh, called Saving Newburgh.

In 2009, the Republican party did not field its own candidates for city council. Instead the Republican Committee endorsed two Democrats—one a former councilman, the other an incumbent councilwoman—and they were not opposed for the Republican nomination in the primary despite their being registered Democrats. The Conservative and Independence parties both nominated them also. They lost the Democratic primary and despite their appearing on three party lines they lost the November election to two straight Democrats, both one time Republicans.

Newburgh declared itself a sanctuary city in March 2017.

The City Council passed a ceasefire resolution in Hamas' war on Israel on January 22, 2024.

== Education ==
In 1978, students at Newburgh Free Academy, the city's public high school, boycotted classes. This ultimately led to a major reorganization of the school system. Newburgh is served by the Newburgh Enlarged City School District.

The local high school is called Newburgh Free Academy, and it is the largest public high school in Orange County. It serves approximately 3,000 students in grades 9–12 from the Newburgh area. Newburgh Free Academy is currently split into three campuses, with NFA Main located on Fullerton Avenue, NFA North located on Robinson Avenue a few blocks away, and NFA West located on West Street. Between the three campuses, there are roughly over 4,300 students enrolled. Two colleges are located in Newburgh, Mount Saint Mary College and the Newburgh campus of SUNY Orange.

== Media ==
Newburgh is within the media market of New York City and Middletown. It is served by The Mid Hudson Times (Newburgh-based weekly), The Times Herald-Record, The Hudson Valley Press, The New York Times, The Wall Street Journal, El Diario La Prensa, The New York Post, and other newspapers local to the area. Its television market features News 12 Hudson Valley, a regional television channel marketed toward the Hudson River Valley Area.

== Infrastructure ==
=== Transportation ===
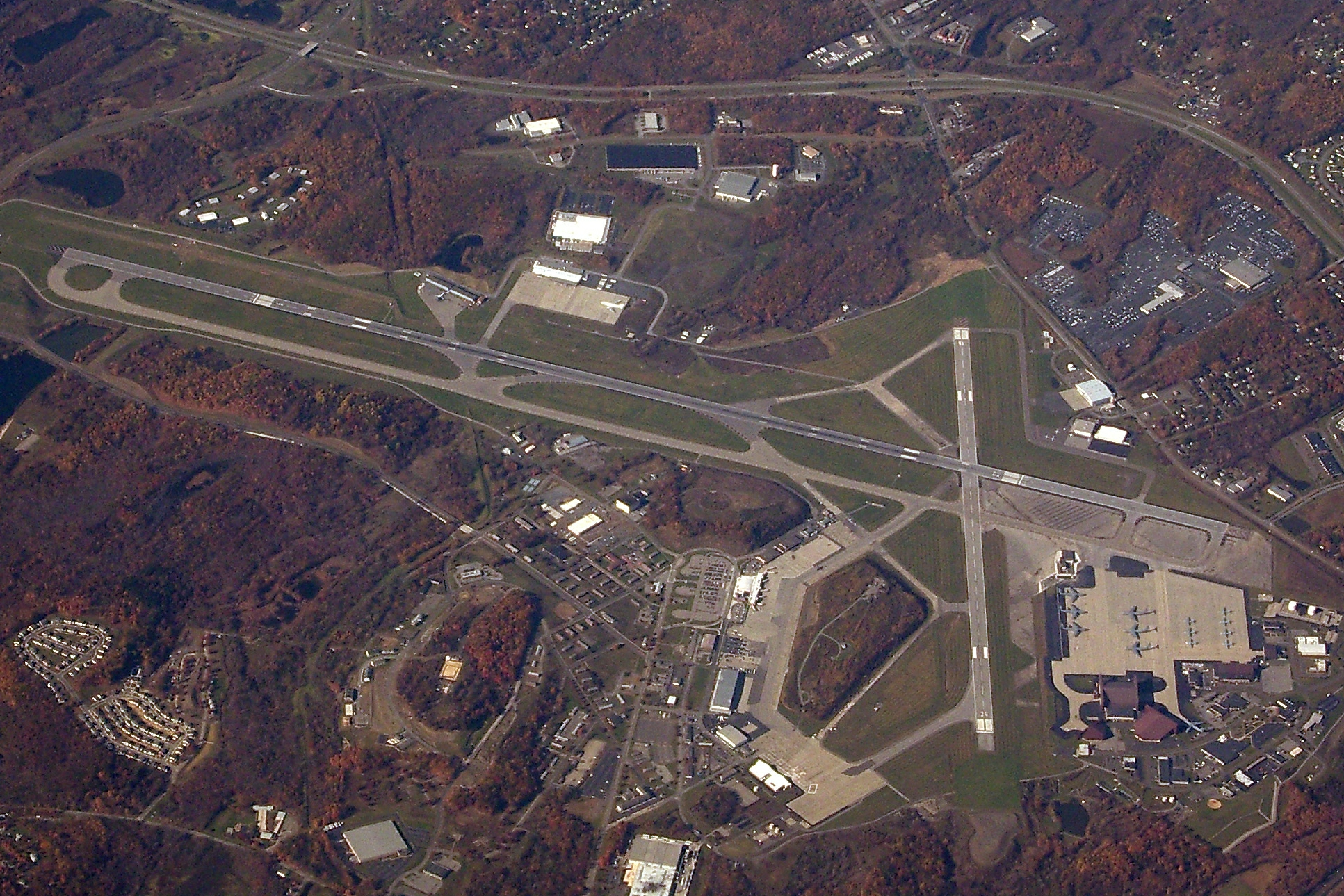
Stewart International Airport from above, 2007

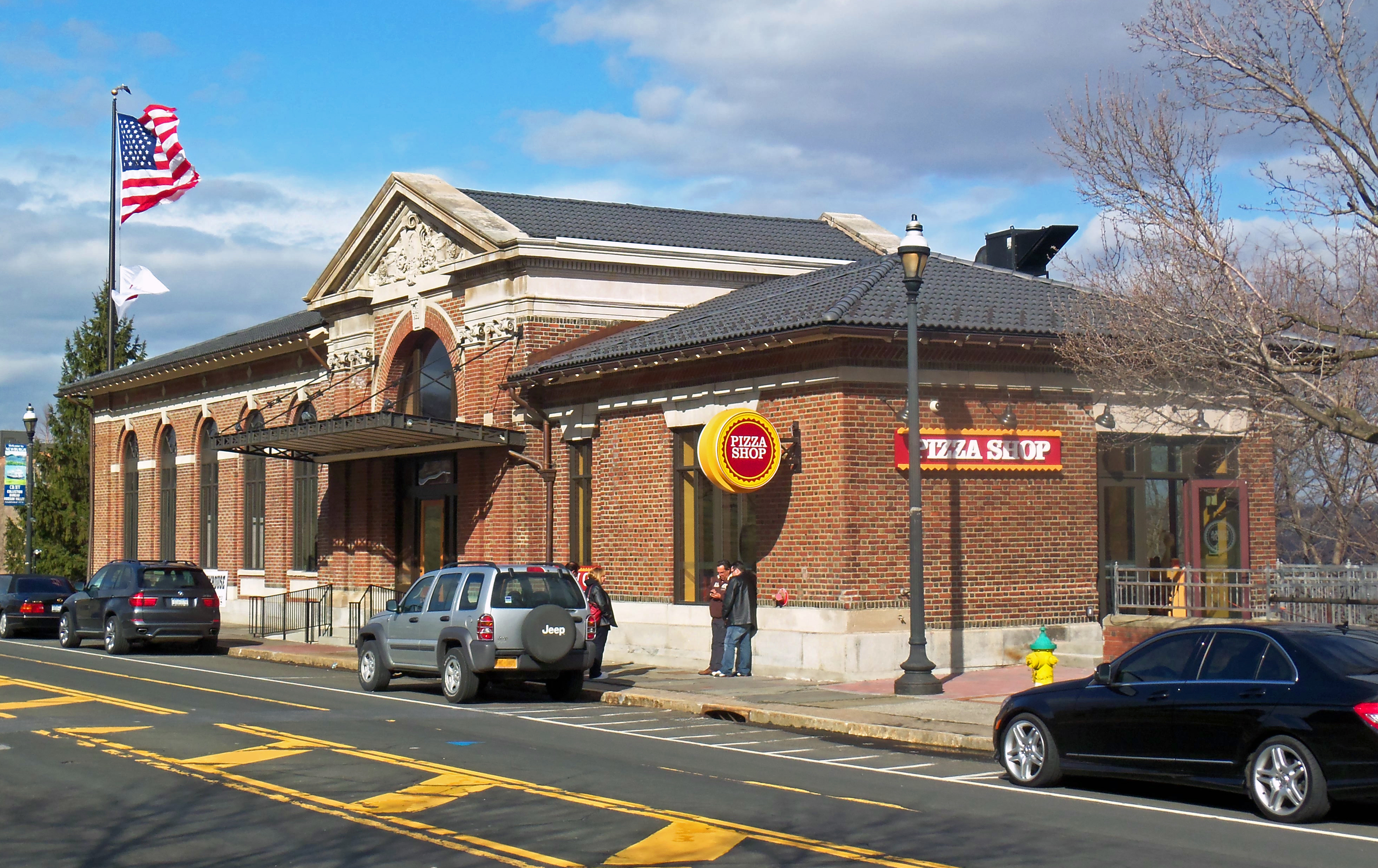
The former Newburgh Station of the West Shore Railroad

Allegiant Air and Breeze Airways provide passenger flights Stewart International Airport, west of the city. Metro-North Railroad, at Beacon station on the opposite east shore of the Hudson River, accessible via the Newburgh-Beacon Bridge Shuttle bus during peak hours, connects to commuter rail service on the Hudson Line, with frequent commuter rail service to Westchester County and Grand Central Terminal in New York City. There is also service on the Metro-North Railroad Port Jervis Line from nearby Salisbury Mills—Cornwall station to Hoboken Terminal and Secaucus Junction in New Jersey and connects to Penn Station in New York City. The last Albany-Weehawken trains through Newburgh left in 1958 when the New York Central ended service north of West Haverstraw on the West Shore Railroad.

The River Rose is a sight-seeing ferry on a paddlewheel style boat. While it does not offer point-to-point commuter service across the Hudson River, from May 31 to October 31 it offers local cruises. Hudson River Adventures runs sightseeing tours on its conventional style cruise Pride of the Hudson, running cruises, May to October.

Ulster County Area Transit provides limited bus service to New Paltz on its route X. Short Line, part of Coach USA, provides daily service down Route 32 to Central (Hudson) Valley and points in New Jersey and New York City. Local service is also provided within the city by Newburgh Area Transit Leprechaun Lines also provides a Newburgh-Beacon-Stewart link. Coach USA also provides transportation to other points in Orange County, including Middletown and Woodbury.

New York State Route 32 and U.S. Route 9W pass through the city. New York State Route 17K and New York State Route 207 also reach their eastern termini within city limits. Interstate 84 passes just north of the city and the New York State Thruway (I-87) not far to the west.

=== Public safety ===
==== Police ====
Newburgh's early police department consisted of twenty-two officers. On April 6, 1869, the Newburgh Police Department was authorized with regulations by the Common Council Ordinance. The first headquarters of the department was on First Street between Montgomery and Smith Street. Its current headquarters is located on both Broadway and Grand Street.

==== Fire ====
Newburgh's Fire Department operates out of two citywide firehouses. The department runs a frontline apparatus fleet of four engine companies (including two reserve engines), two ladder companies (including one reserve ladder), one fire boat, one fire alarm truck, and seven support units. It also houses and runs one of the Orange County Technical Rescue trailers as well as a foam trailer as part of the NYS Foam Task Force.

In 1934 the earlier volunteer companies were replaced by a professional department.

=== Hospitals ===
The city's economy is also stimulated by several hospitals and medical institutions including Montefiore St. Lukes Cornwall Hospital, the Veterans Health Administration (VA) and Hudson Valley Healthcare System.

=== Water supply ===
In May 2016, the city requested help for its PFOS contaminated water supply under Superfund; The source of the contamination was foam used during firefighting drills held by the Stewart Air National Guard Fire Department. Representative Sean Patrick Maloney demanded emergency action after EPA announced PFOA and PFOS Standards for Drinking Water, and called Stewart Air National Guard Base being "the most likely source" of contamination.

== Notable people ==
- Rob Affuso, former drummer of the band Skid Row
- Shad Barry, former MLB player
- Augustus Belknap (1841–1889), businessman, railway executive, Union Army officer, and alderman of San Antonio
- William W. Belknap (1829–1890), U.S. Secretary of War
- Mary Bonauto (born 1961), civil-rights attorney known for work on same-sex marriage
- Jackie Burch (1951–2025), casting director for film and television
- Harry Griffith Cramer Jr. (1926–1957), U.S. Army Special Forces captain, first American soldier killed in the Vietnam War
- Elias Smith Dennis (1812–1894), U.S. Army general
- Andrew Jackson Downing (1815–1852), architect and landscape designer
- Geraldine Ferraro (1935–2011), Democratic member of the U.S. House of Representatives (1979–1985) and the Democratic vice presidential candidate in 1984
- Pardison Fontaine (born 1989), singer, songwriter and rapper
- Richard B. Freeman (born 1943), economist, Harvard University Herbert Ascherman Professor of Economics, and Co-Director of the Labor and Worklife Program at Harvard Law School
- Michael C. Gross (1945–2015), artist, designer and film producer. Gross designed the logo for the movie Ghostbusters (1984) and was the art director for National Lampoon magazine (1970–1974)
- William S. Hart (1864–1946), actor
- Edward Howell (1792–1871), former U.S. Congressman
- William T. Innis (1826–1901), Wisconsin state legislator and farmer
- Augustus Jones (1757–1836), American-born surveyor who performed some land transfers in Newburgh area before embarking his career and majority of life in Upper Canada (now Ontario)
- Ellsworth Kelly (1923–2015), artist
- Judy Kennedy (1945–2018), politician and businesswoman, mayor of Newburgh
- Jeff Klein (born 1976), singer, songwriter and musician
- Lee Lorenz, cartoonist
- Martin B. McKneally (1914–1992), national commander of the American Legion (1959–1960) and was a Republican member of the U.S. House of Representatives (1968–1970)
- Albert J. Myer (1828–1880), U.S. Army general
- Benjamin Barker Odell, Jr. (1854–1926), Republican member of the U.S. House of Representatives (1895–1899) and Governor of New York State (1900–1904)
- James Patterson (born 1947), novelist
- David Law Proudfit (1842–1897), poet and lithographer
- Homer Ramsdell (1810—1894), businessman and railroad president
- George D. Ruggles (1833–1904), Adjutant General of the U.S. Army (1893–1897)
- Fannie Morris Spencer (1865–1943), organist and composer
- Joe Steffy, football player for Tennessee and Army, Korean War veteran
- Paul Teutul Sr. (born 1949), founder of Orange County Choppers, a manufacturer of custom motorcycles
- Albert W. Van Duzer (1917–1999), bishop of the Episcopal Diocese of New Jersey, (1973–1982)
- James Varick (1750–1827), first bishop of the African Methodist Episcopal Zion Church
- Peter Ward (1827–1891), mayor of Newburgh and state senator
- Coulton Waugh (1896–1973), artist (of Dickie Dare comic strip) and mapmaker
- Saul Williams (born 1972), poet, actor and hip-hop artist
- John E. Wool (1784–1869), officer in the U.S. Army
- Jordan Oliver (professional wrestler) (born 1999), American professional wrestler

== See also ==
- List of cities in New York
