= New York State Armory (Newburgh) =

- U.S. National Register of Historic Places
- U.S. Historic district – Contributing property
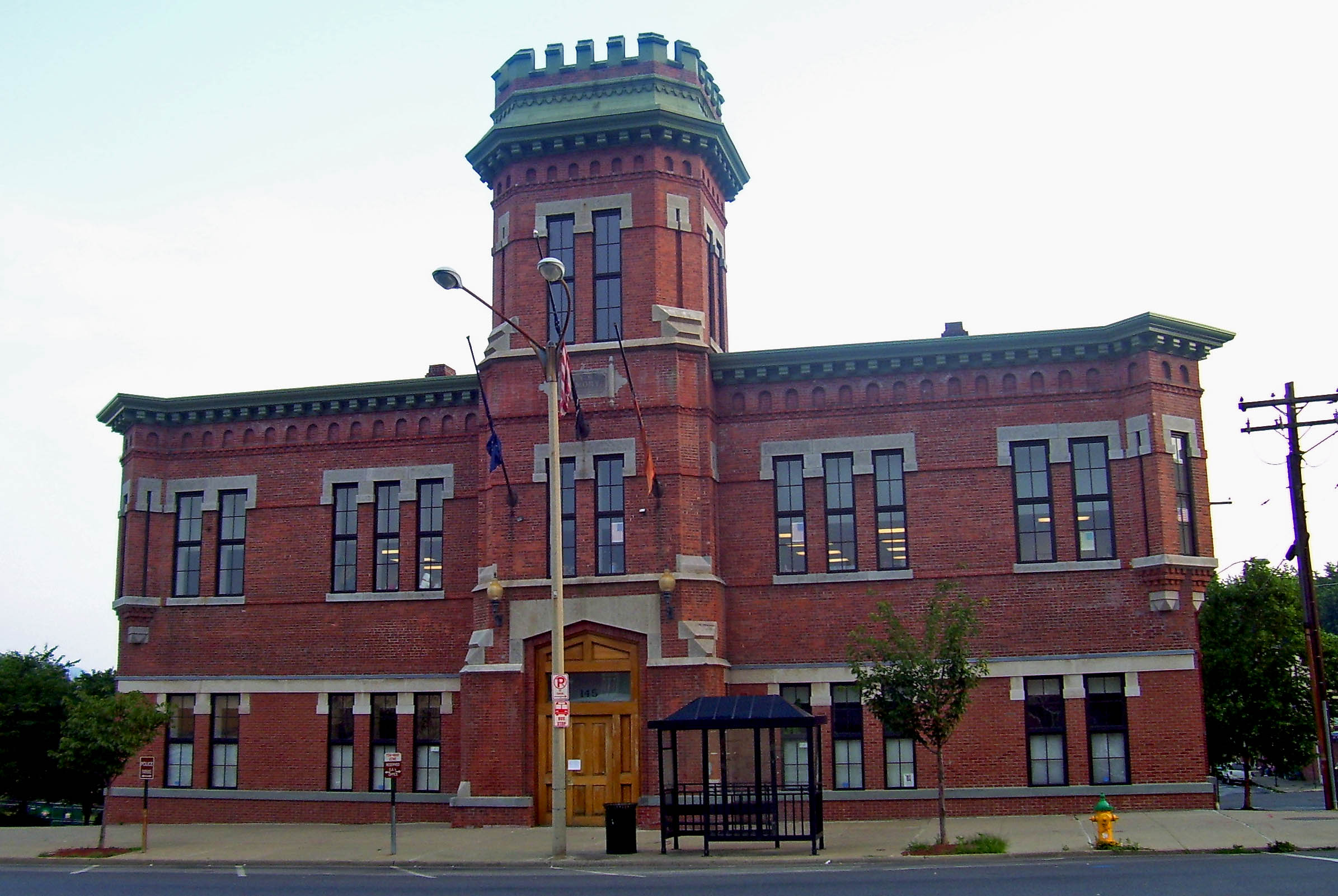
- The Armory building in 2007
- Location: Newburgh
- Coordinates: 41°29′59″N 74°00′49″W
- Built: late 19th century
- Architect: John A. Wood
- Part of: East End Historic District (ID85002426)
- NRHP reference No.: 81000411
- Added to NRHP: 1981

The New York State Armory was built in 1880 on Broadway in Newburgh, New York, United States. Designed by John A. Wood, it housed a local unit of the New York National Guard.

In the 1930s the Guard moved to a newer armory on South William Street and the old building fell vacant and became property of the city. It was nearly gutted by fire in the 1970s but remained standing, an eyesore in Newburgh's Lower Broadway area.

In 1981 it was added to the National Register of Historic Places, which helped prevent its demolition. It also became one of over 2,000 contributing properties to the East End Historic District when that was added to the Register four years later.

Nothing was done to refurbish it until the late 1990s, when the city sold it to Orange County for a dollar and the county's former courthouse. The county brought in Robert Carchietta's Gemma Development to restore it. The project won the Commissioner's Annual Private Sector Achievement Award from Bernadette Castro, then-commissioner of the New York State Office of Parks, Recreation and Historic Preservation. The company spent $28,000 on a mahogany door for the building, which now houses the busy city office of the county's Social Services department, as well as its probation officers and the district attorney.
