= East End Historic District (Newburgh, New York) =

Historic district in New York, United States

- U.S. National Register of Historic Places
- U.S. Historic district
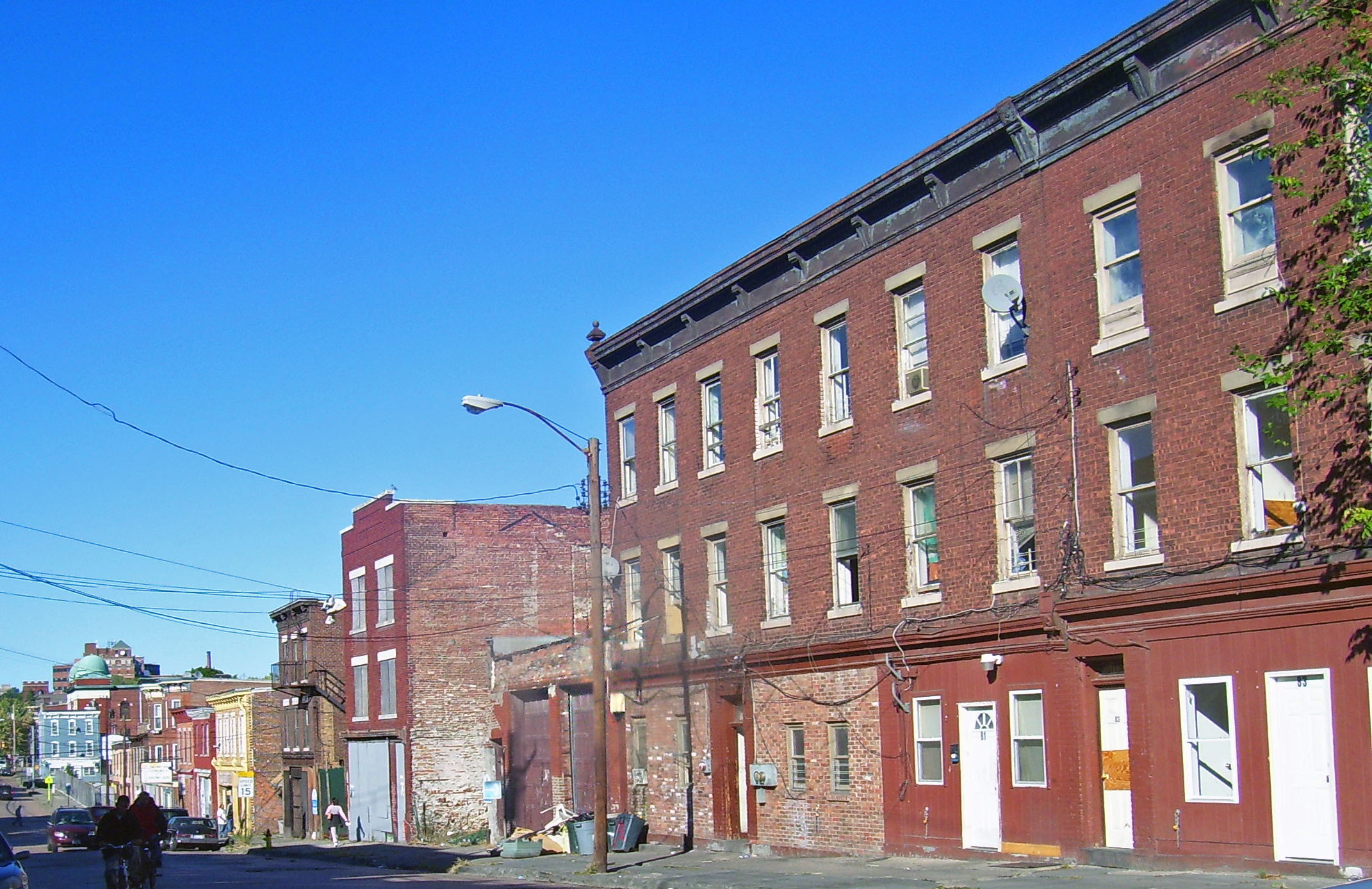
- View north along William Street, 2007

- Location within New York Location within the United States
- Location: Newburgh, NY
- Coordinates: 41°29′46″N 74°00′46″W
- Area: 445 acres (180 ha)
- Built: mid-18th–mid-20th centuries
- Architect: multiple
- Architectural style: Italianate, Second Empire, Gothic Revival
- NRHP reference No.: 85002426
- Added to NRHP: 1985

The East End Historic District in Newburgh, New York, United States is the lower portion of what state and city officials recognize as a single historic district along with the Montgomery-Grand-Liberty Streets Historic District. Its 445 acres (2 km^{2}) contain 2,217 buildings, including Washington's Headquarters State Historic Site, a National Historic Landmark.

This area includes much of the southeastern quarter of the city. Most of the buildings were constructed during the city's height of industrial development in the later 19th century, as opposed to the villas and mansions in the Montgomery-Grand-Liberty district. They housed many of the city's working-class population at the time, and the small businesses that served them. First recognized by the city in 1973, it was added to the National Register of Historic Places in 1985.

Today, it is a mix of extremes. Some of its neighborhoods are among the city's most desirable, offering panoramic views of the Hudson River's Newburgh Bay and the Hudson Highlands to the south. It is also home to some of the city's poorest neighborhoods, and historic preservation groups have expressed concern about many important properties being lost to urban blight and neglect.

== Geography ==
The district is roughly bounded by Robinson Avenue (US 9W) to the west, Water Street and Bay View Terrace on the east, Monument and Renwick streets to the south and LeRoy Place and Broadway to the north. This area of Newburgh, combined with the other district, represents the core of the settled city by the end of the 19th century. It rises up gently from the riverside area to mildly rolling higher ground.

Industrial properties, both vacant and in use, are concentrated closer to the river, while the higher neighborhoods are mostly residential, with some institutional buildings such as schools and churches scattered throughout. There are a few commercial areas, most notably along Liberty Street opposite Washington's Headquarters, taking advantage of tourist business at the historic site during the summer months; along Broadway near City Hall and also along a short block of William Street further south.

Combined and treated as one district, the 4,000 contributing properties are the most of any historic district in New York. The 2,239 resources in the East End alone are the most of any federally recognized district in the state.

== Architecture ==
Much of the district is characterized by two- or three-story brick townhouses in the Italianate style popular in the late 19th century for urban buildings. In Washington Heights, the blocks near the southeastern corner of the district, where views of the river open up, there are houses in many Victorian styles reflecting the rapid subdivision and development of that area between 1886 and 1900.

The houses on and near Parmenter Street, one block west of Washington's Headquarters, are the only part of Newburgh that still reflects the village character of the settlement from the turn of the 19th century. Houses here are gabled two-story structures in the Federal style, not found much elsewhere in the city.

=== Significant contributing properties ===
The oldest property in the district and the city, Jonathan Hasbrouck's 1750 stone house, is today the center of Washington's Headquarters State Historic Site, recognizing the general's residence here during the years between British surrender at Yorktown and final withdrawal from the American colonies in 1783. In the 1850s, it acquired additional historical significance when it became the first state-recognized historic site in the country. Today it is one of Newburgh's two National Historic Landmarks, under the management of the Palisades Interstate Park Commission. Another contributing property within the district has been separately listed in the National Register. The New York State Armory on Broadway had been vacant for decades after the New York National Guard unit stationed there moved to a newer building several blocks away in the 1930s. A fire in the 1970s had left it a blackened shell. It seemed likely to be torn down until it was sold to Orange County, which brought in a private developer to rebuild it with help from the state's Office of Historic Preservation. It now houses the county's Social Services operations in the city.

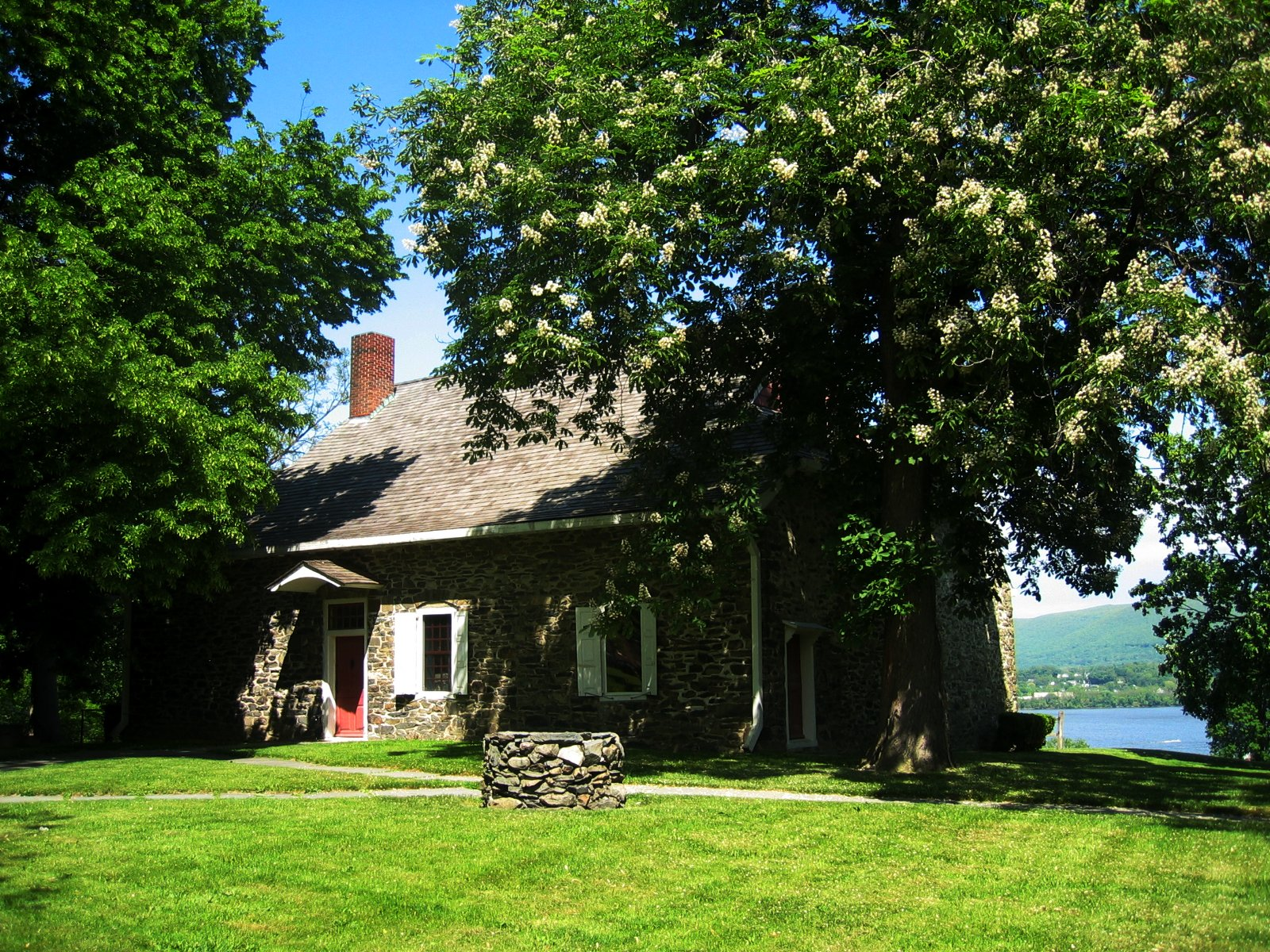
Hasbrouck House at Washington's Headquarters

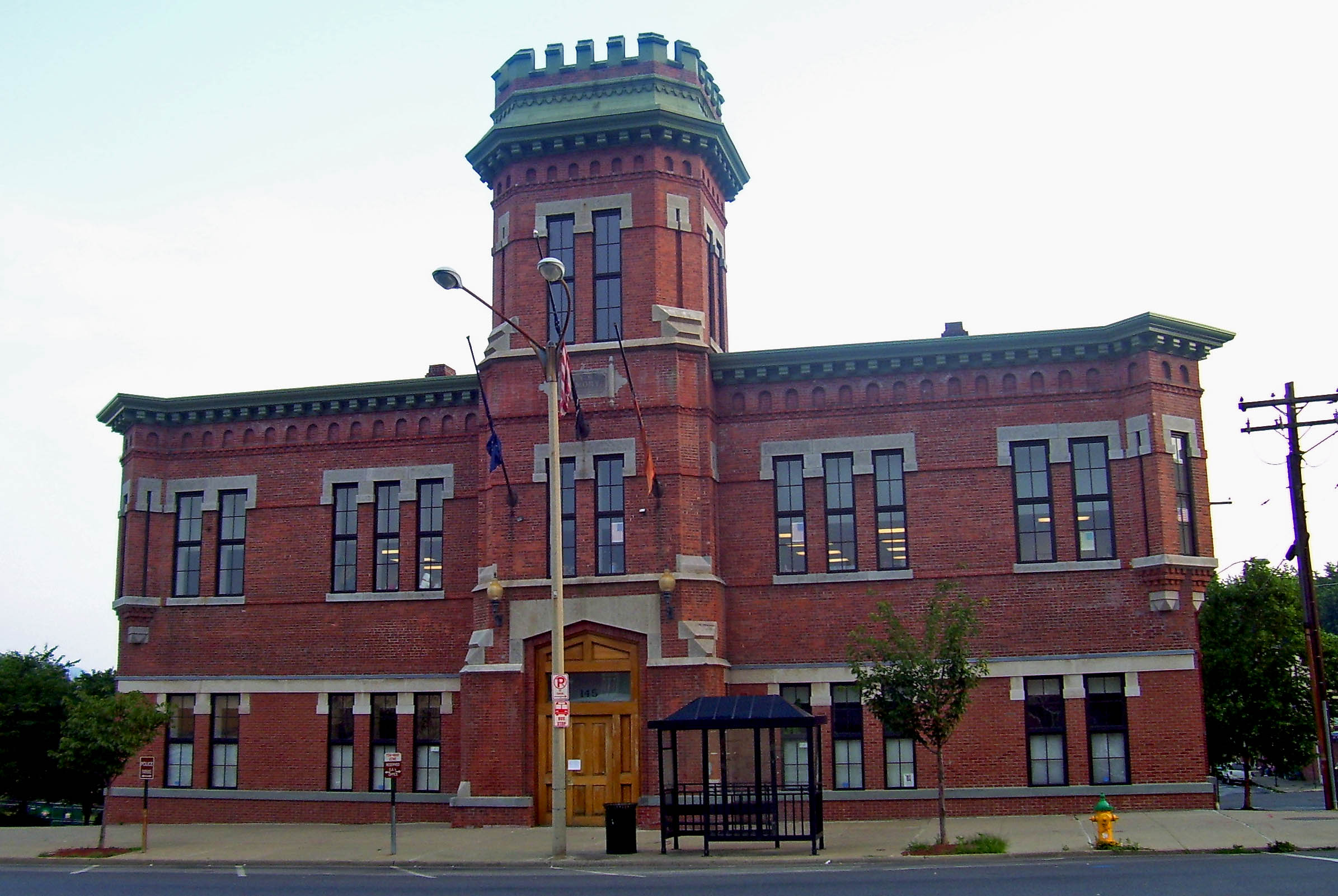
The armory in 2007

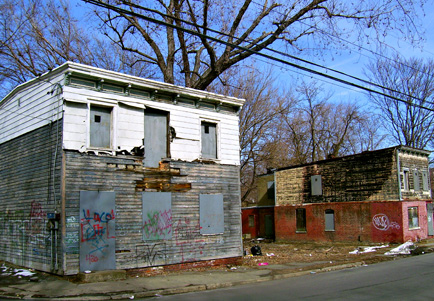
Urban blight on two abandoned houses not far from the Armory.

== Preservation issues ==
The city has recognized the historic district in its zoning, required architectural review of any significant construction within it, and initiated and encouraged many efforts to redevelop portions of it. Many properties remain abandoned and neglected, and in 1996 the National Trust for Historic Preservation listed the district as one of America's Most Endangered Places. As of 2007 it saw the district's outlook as favorable after the River City Development Corporation, a Community Development Corporation, obtained federal grants to rehabilitate some of the old row houses into affordable housing. In 1999 the Preservation League of New York State added a portion of the district to its "Seven to Save" list, since freed slaves congregated and lived around a nearby African Methodist Episcopal Zion church and the neighborhood in question, along Parmenter Street in the "village" portion of Newburgh, is one of the oldest African-American neighborhoods in the state.

In April 2017 a $15 million "scattered site" development project using a combination of state/federal Low Income Housing and Historic Tax Credits was underway. "The Newburgh Core Revitalization Project" by Kingston-based not for profit RUPCO in cooperation with The Newburgh Community Land Bank will restore 15 buildings and transform the properties into 45 affordable rental apartments to assist middle income families, artists, veterans and the homeless. The revitalization project is expected to be completed by Sept. 2018, with first tenants arriving in late 2017. http://spectrumlocalnews.com/nys/hudson-valley/news/2017/04/7/rupco-begins--15-million-core-revitalization-project-in-the-city-of-newburgh

== See also ==
- National Register of Historic Places listings in Orange County, New York
