= Newburgh Colored Burial Ground =

Historic site in Orange County, New York, US

- U.S. National Register of Historic Places
- U.S. Historic district
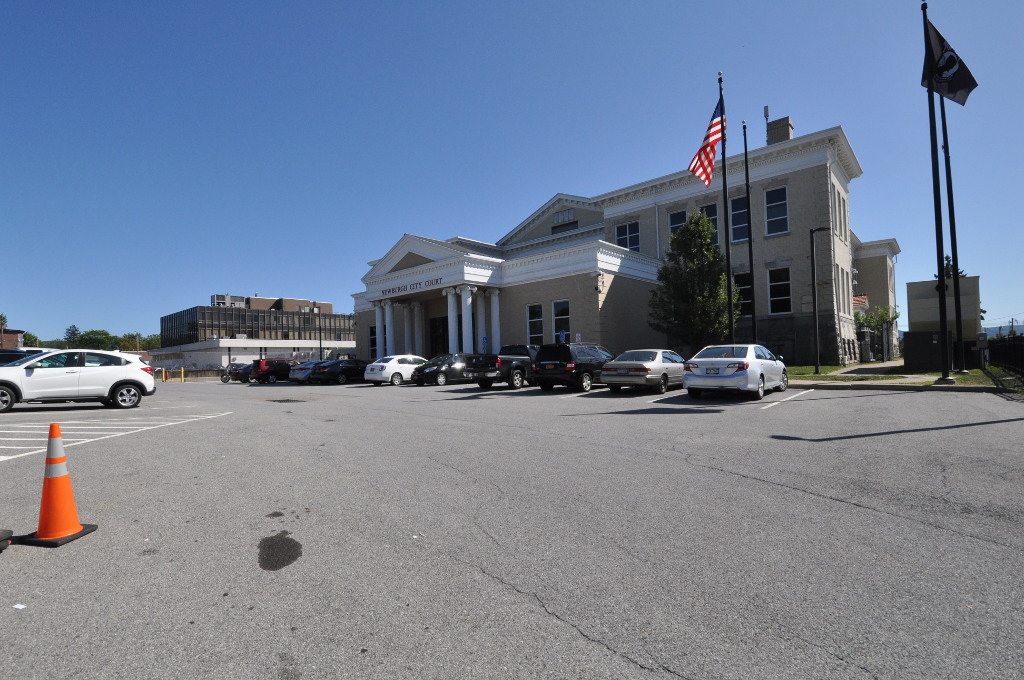
- The cemetery is located in part under this parking lot and to the right of the building

- Location within New York Location within the United States
- Location: Broadway & Robinson Avenue (US 9W), Newburgh, New York
- Coordinates: 41°30′2.53″N 74°1′16.89″W
- Area: 0.9 acres (0.36 ha)
- Built: 1820
- NRHP reference No.: 10000137
- Added to NRHP: March 31, 2010

Newburgh Colored Burial Ground is a historic cemetery and national historic district located at Newburgh in Orange County, New York.

The district consists of an archaeological site for a 19th-century burial ground containing approximately 100 graves located on the west and northwest sides of the Newburgh City Courthouse, possibly extending under adjacent Robinson Avenue. The cemetery was active between about 1832 and 1867.

In 1908, a school building was built on top of the cemetery, apparently without removing the graves or remains of those interred there. In 2008, renovations at the Broadway School unearthed the remains of 105 individuals. Six sets of remains were left on-site, while the other 99 were taken into custody of the State University of New York at New Paltz. The Broadway School building is now the City of Newburg Courthouse.

It was listed on the National Register of Historic Places in 2010.

In 2022, the City Council of Newburgh agreed to develop a memorial park in Downing Park.
