= David Law Proudfit =

American poet and lithographer

David Law Proudfit (October 27, 1842, Newburgh, New York – February 23, 1897, New York City) was an American poet and lithographer, who also wrote under the pseudonym Peleg Arkwright.

Son of a clergyman, Proudfit was educated at the common schools until the onset of the Civil War. Enlisting as a private in the 1st Regiment New York Mounted Rifles aged nineteen, he spent four years as a soldier, rising to the rank of major. He then went to New York and entered business in lithography. He began contributing to periodicals under the pseudonym Peleg Arkwright, until success encouraged him to write under his own name. In 1868 he married Frances Marian Dodge. His later business interests included pneumatic tubes; in the 1880s he was president of the Meteor despatch company of New York.

== Works ==
- Love among the Gamins, and other poems, New York, 1877
- Mask and Domino, 1888
- From the Chaparral to Wall Street; or a man from the West, 1891
