= Hudson Highlands Multiple Resource Area =

The Hudson Highlands Multiple Resource Area is a Multiple Property Submission study supporting multiple listings in 1982 to the United States National Register of Historic Places. It originally included 58 properties spread over the counties of Dutchess, Putnam, Westchester, Orange and Rockland.

== Properties ==
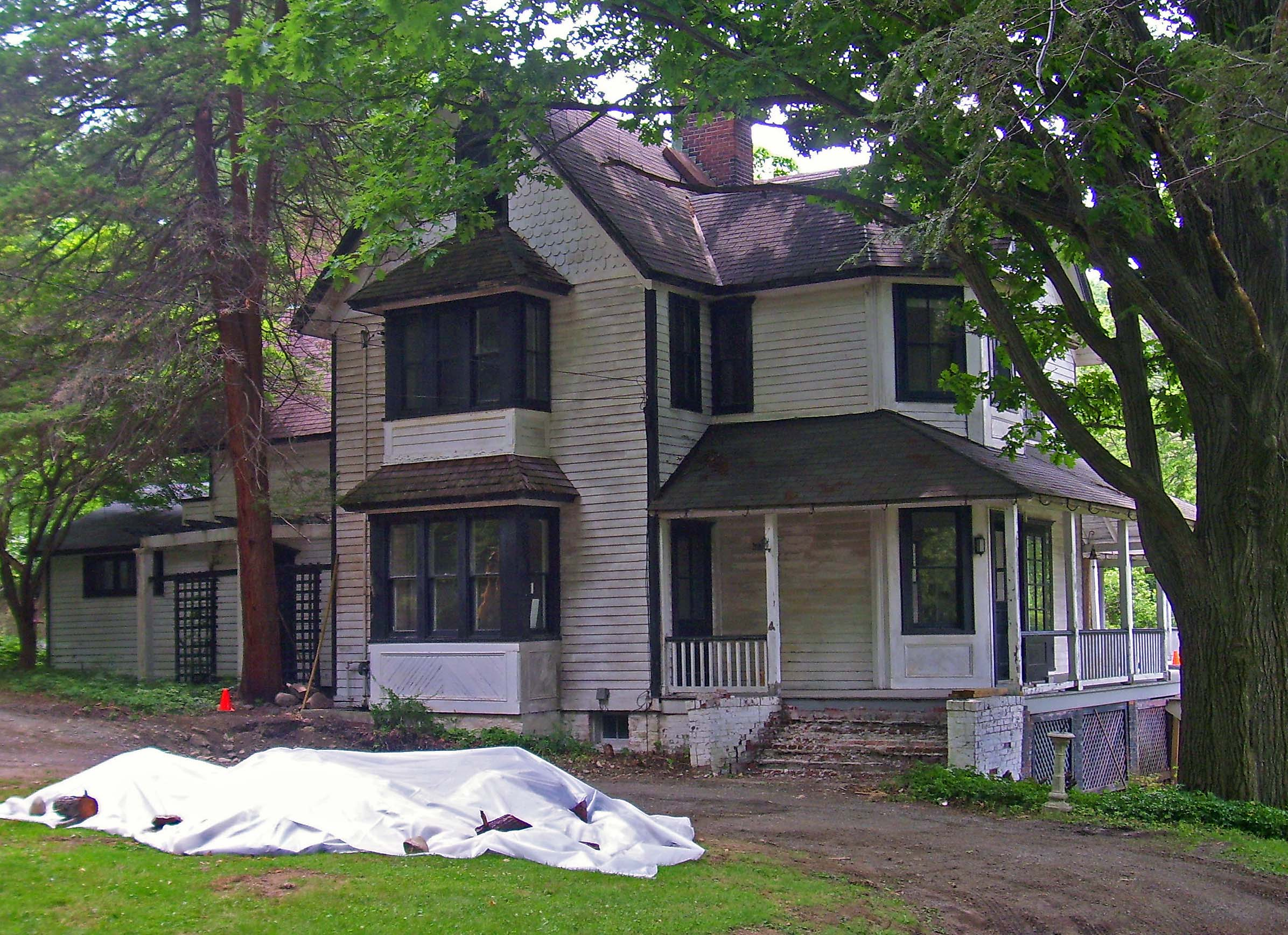
The Amelia Barr House

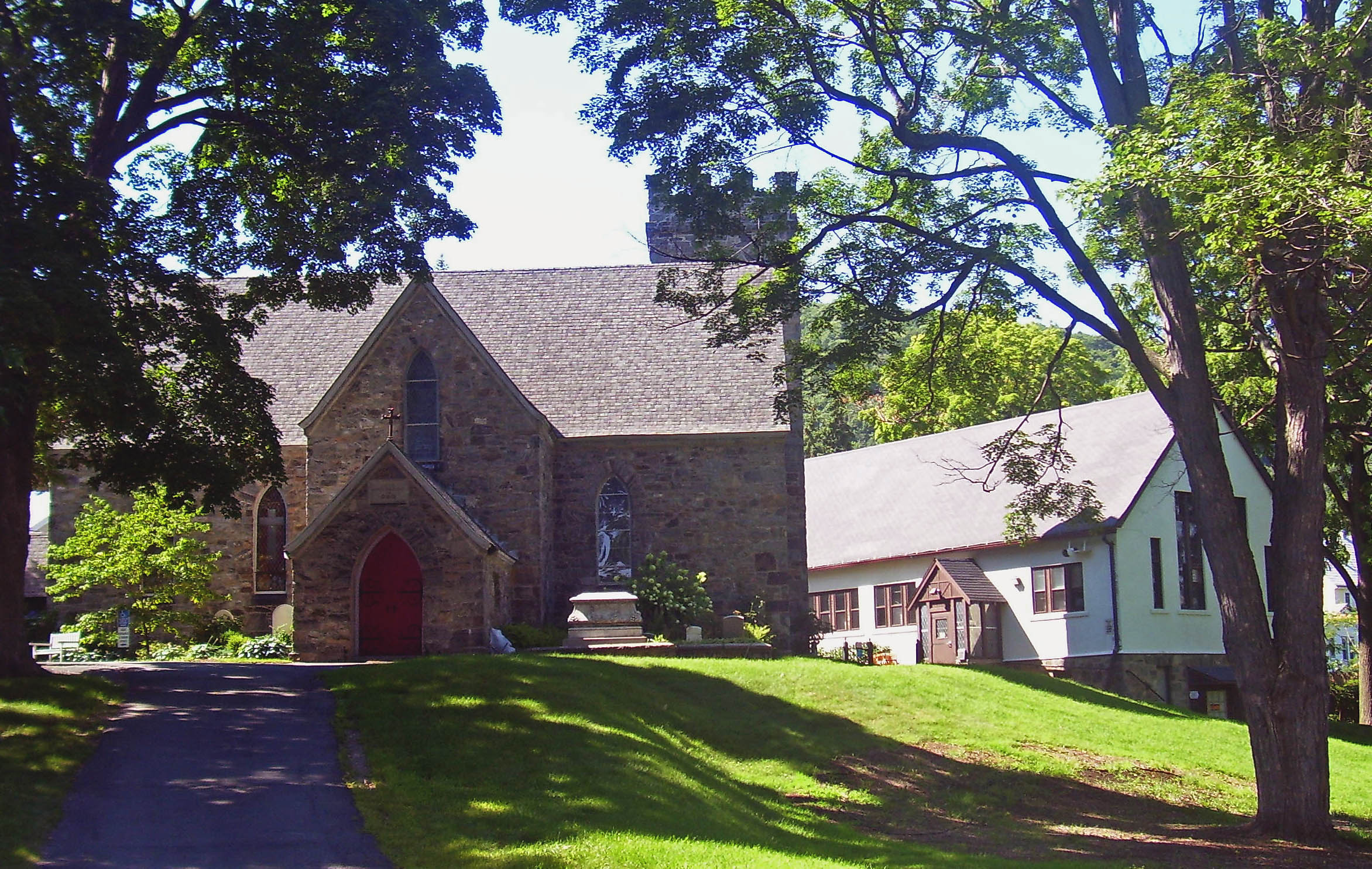
The Church of the Holy Innocents and its rectory

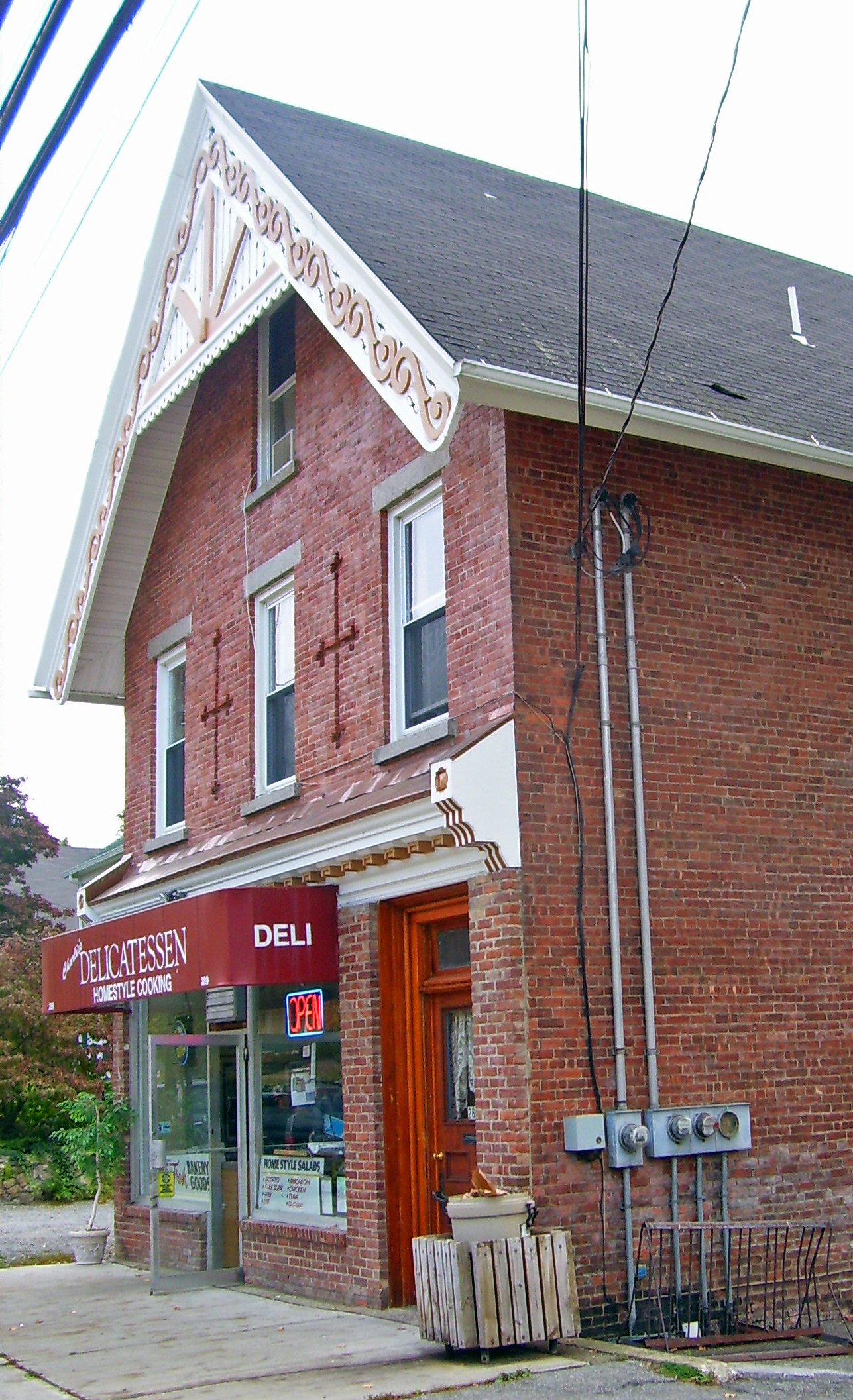
The J. Y. Dykman Flour and Feed Store

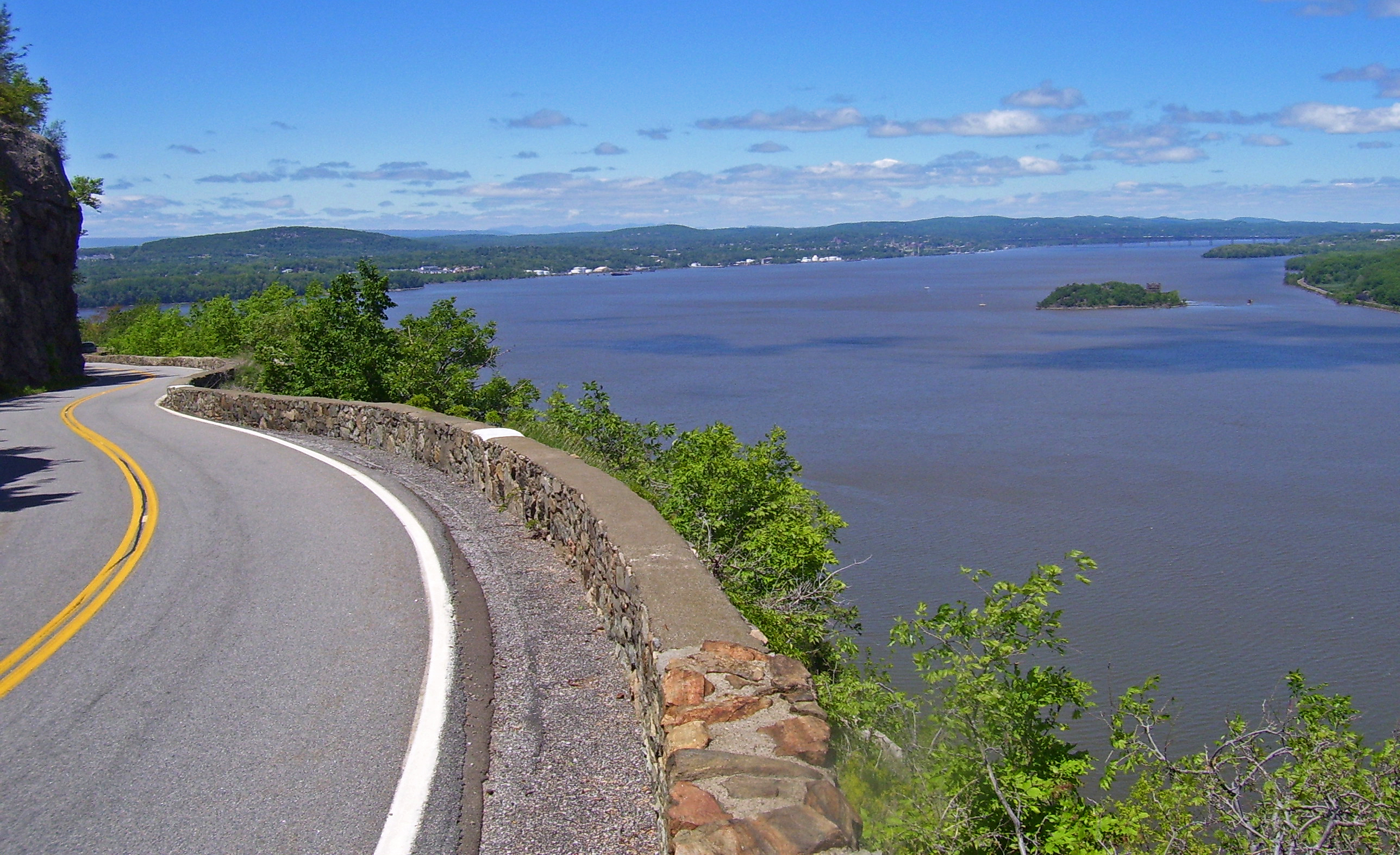
Pollepel Island (closest on right), site of Bannerman's Castle, seen from the Storm King Highway

- Amelia Barr House, Cornwall-on-Hudson
- Bannerman's Island Arsenal, Fishkill
- Bear Mountain Bridge Cortlandt and Stony Point
- Bear Mountain Bridge Road and Toll House
- Bear Mountain State Park Historic District
- Camp Olmsted, Cornwall-on-Hudson
- Church of the Holy Innocents and Rectory, Highland Falls
- Cragston Dependencies, Highland Falls
- Cold Spring Cemetery Gatehouse, Nelsonville
- Cold Spring Historic District, Cold Spring
- Deer Hill, Cornwall-on-Hudson
- Dutchess Manor, Fishkill
- Dragon Rock, Garrison
- Eagle's Rest, Garrison
- Fair Lawn, Cold Spring
- First Baptist Church of Cold Spring, Nelsonville
- First Presbyterian Church of Highland Falls, Highland Falls
- Fish and Fur Club, Nelsonville
- Garrison Landing Historic District, Garrison
- Garrison Union Free School, Garrison
- Gatehouse on Deerhill Road, Cornwall-on-Hudson
- Glenfields, Garrison
- Highland Falls Railroad Depot, Highland Falls
- Highland Falls Village Hall, Highland Falls
- House at 116 Main Street, Highland Falls
- House at 249 Main Street, Nelsonville
- House at 3 Crown Street, Nelsonville
- House at 37 Center Street, Highland Falls
- Hurst-Pierrepont Estate, Garrison
- Hustis House, Nelsonville
- H. D. Champlin & Son Horseshoeing and Wagonmaking, Nelsonville
- J. Y. Dykman Flour and Feed Store, Nelsonville
- J. Y. Dykman Store, Nelsonville
- LeDoux/Healey House, Cornwall-on-Hudson
- Mandeville House, Garrison
- Montrest, Cold Spring
- Moore House, Garrison
- Mount Beacon Incline Railway, Beacon
- Normandy Grange, Garrison
- Old Albany Post Road, Philipstown
- Oulagisket, Garrison
- Parry House, Highland Falls
- Pine Terrace, Highland Falls
- Plumbush, Cold Spring
- River View House, Cornwall-on-Hudson
- Rock Lawn and Carriage House, Garrison
- St. Mark's Episcopal Church, Fort Montgomery
- St. Philip's Church in the Highlands, Garrison
- Stonihurst, Highland Falls
- Storm King Highway, Cornwall and Highlands
- The Birches, Garrison
- The Squirrels, Highland Falls
- Walker House, Garrison
- Walter Thompson House, Garrison
- Webb Lane House, Highland Falls
- Wilson House, Garrison
- Woodlawn, Garrison
