= National Register of Historic Places listings in Putnam County, New York =

Location of Putnam County in New York

List of the National Register of Historic Places listings in Putnam County, New York

This is intended to be a complete list of properties and districts listed on the National Register of Historic Places in Putnam County, New York. The locations of National Register properties and districts (at least for all showing latitude and longitude coordinates below) may be seen in a map by clicking on "Map of all coordinates". Two properties are further designated as National Historic Landmarks of the United States.

This National Park Service list is complete through NPS recent listings posted May 1, 2026.

Contents: Counties in New York
Albany (Albany) – Allegany – Bronx – Broome – Cattaraugus – Cayuga – Chautauqua – Chemung – Chenango – Clinton – Columbia – Cortland – Delaware – Dutchess (Poughkeepsie, Rhinebeck) – Erie (Buffalo) – Essex – Franklin – Fulton – Genesee – Greene – Hamilton – Herkimer – Jefferson – Kings – Lewis – Livingston – Madison – Monroe (Rochester) – Montgomery – Nassau – New York (Below 14th Street, 14th to 59th Streets, 59th to 110th Streets, Above 110th Street, Islands) – Niagara (Niagara Falls) – Oneida – Onondaga (Syracuse) – Ontario – Orange – Orleans – Oswego – Otsego – Putnam – Queens – Rensselaer – Richmond – Rockland – St. Lawrence – Saratoga – Schenectady – Schoharie – Schuyler – Seneca – Steuben – Suffolk – Sullivan – Tioga – Tompkins – Ulster – Warren – Washington – Wayne – Westchester (Northern, Southern, New Rochelle, Peekskill, Yonkers) – Wyoming – Yates

== Listings county-wide ==
	Name on the Register	Image	Date listed	Location	City or town	Description
1	The Birches	The Birches	November 23, 1982 (#82001259)	Cat Rock Rd. 41°22′31″N 73°56′38″W	Garrison	1882 Victorian Gothic house designed for Illinois Central president William Osborn; used as honeymoon house by both his sons. One of Ralph Adams Cram's earliest works
2	Boscobel	Boscobel	November 7, 1977 (#77000971)	N of Garrison on NY 9D; 41°24′39″N 73°56′22″W	Garrison	Outstanding example of Federal style mansion, built by States Dyckman in 1808, with many original furnishings. Moved upriver from original site at Montrose and restored after several years in state storage when FDR Veterans Hospital was built on original site.
3	Walter Brewster House	Walter Brewster House	October 4, 1978 (#78001896)	Oak St. 41°23′42″N 73°36′59″W	Brewster	Home of village founder; only Greek Revival home in county with a two-story colonnade
4	Castle Rock	Castle Rock	December 12, 1977 (#77000972)	NY 9D; 41°22′06″N 73°56′28″W	Garrison	Eclectic mountaintop estate built by J. Morgan Slade for William Osborn in 1881; a major Hudson Highlands landmark ever since
5	H. D. Champlin & Son Horseshoeing and Wagonmaking	H. D. Champlin & Son Horseshoeing and Wagonmaking	November 23, 1982 (#82001234)	286 Main St. 41°25′29″N 73°56′49″W	Nelsonville	Late 19th-century commercial structure preserved nearly intact
6	Cold Spring Cemetery Gatehouse	Cold Spring Cemetery Gatehouse	November 23, 1982 (#82001236)	Peekskill Rd. 41°25′20″N 73°56′41″W	Nelsonville	1862 Gothic Revival gatehouse with unusual roof styling; one of the earliest uses of that style in the Highlands
7	Cold Spring Historic District	Cold Spring Historic District	November 23, 1982 (#82001235)	Roughly Main, Fair, Chestnut Sts., and Paulding Ave. 41°25′04″N 73°57′15″W	Cold Spring	Well-preserved core of late 19th-century riverside town
8	DeRham Farm	DeRham Farm	March 28, 1980 (#80002750)	N of Garrison on Indian Brook Rd. 41°24′20″N 73°56′12″W	Garrison	Early 19th-century gentleman farmer's complex on Hudson
9	J. Y. Dykman Flour and Feed Store	J. Y. Dykman Flour and Feed Store	November 23, 1982 (#82001237)	289 Main St. 41°25′28″N 73°56′48″W	Nelsonville	Most ornate commercial building in Nelsonville, dating to mid-19th century
10	J. Y. Dykman Store	J. Y. Dykman Store	November 23, 1982 (#82001238)	255 Main St. 41°25′24″N 73°56′57″W	Nelsonville	Ornate facade on ca. 1890 building now used as antique map store
11	Eagle's Rest	Eagle's Rest	November 23, 1982 (#82001239)	NY 9-D; 41°23′46″N 73°56′14″W	Philipstown	Former estate of New York Yankees' owner Jacob Ruppert; now Saint Basil Academy
12	Fair Lawn		November 23, 1982 (#82001240)	NY 9-D; 41°24′56″N 73°56′37″W	Cold Spring	1860 home built for painter Thomas Prichard Rossiter; later modified by others.
13	First Baptist Church of Cold Spring	First Baptist Church of Cold Spring	November 23, 1982 (#82001241)	Main St. 41°25′22″N 73°56′59″W	Nelsonville	Built in 1833; oldest church building in Philipstown and only frame church in Hudson Highlands
14	First National Bank of Brewster	First National Bank of Brewster	January 7, 1988 (#87002277)	Main St. 41°23′40″N 73°37′10″W	Brewster	Intact Queen Anne-style building from late 19th century later used as by Southeast town hall; still home to some town departments
15	Fish and Fur Club	Fish and Fur Club	November 23, 1982 (#82001242)	258 Main St. 41°25′26″N 73°56′56″W	Nelsonville	1905 rustic sportsmen's clubhouse is now Nelsonville Village Hall
16	Garrison Grist Mill Historic District	Garrison Grist Mill Historic District	December 23, 1993 (#93001434)	Jct. of NY 9D and Lower Station Rd. 41°22′30″N 73°56′46″W	Garrison	Four colonial-era buildings, among the oldest in Garrison, preserved amid a golf course
17	Garrison Landing Historic District	Garrison Landing Historic District	November 23, 1982 (#82001243)	Bounded by Hudson River and NY Central RR Tracks; 41°22′58″N 73°56′52″W	Garrison	Mid-19th century commercial area by train station; used for Gay Nineties Yonkers in 1969 film version of Hello, Dolly
18	Garrison Union Free School	Garrison Union Free School	November 23, 1982 (#82001244)	NY 9-D; 41°22′49″N 73°56′20″W	Garrison	K-8 school built of local stone in 1908 to house public school that dates to 1793
19	Gilead Cemetery	Gilead Cemetery	December 1, 1988 (#88002684)	Mechanic St. 41°24′30″N 73°40′25″W	Carmel	A century and a half of graves dating from mid-18th century, including Revolutionary War spy Enoch Crosby and politician Joel Frost; unusually large collection of funerary art illustrates changes in Protestant view of death.
20	Glenfields	Glenfields	November 23, 1982 (#82001245)	Old Manitou Rd. 41°21′03″N 73°57′12″W	Philipstown	Ca. 1870 estate of Archibald Gracie King, designed by Cornwall firm Mead and Taft
21	The Grove	The Grove	November 21, 2008 (#08001080)	12 Grove Ct. 41°25′08″N 73°57′00″W	Cold Spring	1853 Richard Upjohn house for Cold Spring Foundry surgeon, later founder of American Medical Association
22	House at 249 Main Street	House at 249 Main Street	July 31, 1989 (#82005382)	249 Main St. 41°25′24″N 73°56′58″W	Nelsonville	Ca. 1870 home combines Italianate and Carpenter Gothic design elements
23	House at 3 Crown Street	House at 3 Crown Street	November 23, 1982 (#82001246)	3 Crown St. 41°25′26″N 73°57′01″W	Nelsonville	Sophisticated 1868 Italianate brick residence
24	Hurst-Pierrepont Estate		November 23, 1982 (#82001247)	NY 9-D; 41°22′45″N 73°56′19″W	Garrison	
25	Hustis House	Hustis House	November 23, 1982 (#82001248)	328 Main St. 41°25′37″N 73°56′32″W	Nelsonville	Intact late 19th-century foundry worker housing
26	Indian Brook Road Historic District	Indian Brook Road Historic District	August 19, 1993 (#93000853)	Jct. of Indian Brook Rd. and US 9; 41°24′55″N 73°54′54″W	Garrison	Former rural hamlet of Nelson's Corner, one of the few pre-industrial ones with its plan and buildings largely intact
27	Mandeville House	Mandeville House	November 23, 1982 (#82001251)	Lower Station Rd. 41°22′36″N 73°56′43″W	Philipstown	Built in 1735; oldest house in Garrison. Used as headquarters by Israel Putnam during Revolution; later home to Richard Upjohn, whose Gothic changes were mostly removed in the 1920s.
28	Manitoga	Manitoga	November 15, 1996 (#96001269)	Jct. of NY 9D and Manitou Rd. 41°20′50″N 73°58′52″W	Garrison	Estate of 20th-century industrial designer Russel Wright features house designed to be sustainable and blend into landscape; one of the earliest American houses to do so.
29	Montrest	Montrest	November 23, 1982 (#82001252)	Lane Gate Rd. 41°25′43″N 73°56′07″W	Philipstown	1868 summer home of New York City art dealer
30	Moore House		November 23, 1982 (#82001249)	Nelson Ln. 41°22′49″N 73°56′16″W	Garrison	
31	Normandy Grange	Normandy Grange	November 23, 1982 (#82001250)	NY 9-D; 41°23′31″N 73°55′53″W	Philipstown	Evans Dick liked this 1905 Norman-style gatehouse complex to his never-completed nearby estate more than the estate itself.
32	Old Albany Post Road	Old Albany Post Road	July 8, 1982 (#82003396)	Off US 9; 41°20′27″N 73°54′16″W	Philipstown	Unpaved 6.6-mile (10.6 km) section of original Albany Post Road, with original mileposts, dating to mid-17th century. One of the oldest dirt roads still in use in the U.S.
33	Old Southeast Church	Old Southeast Church	July 24, 1972 (#72000903)	N of Brewster on NY 22 off Putnam Lake Rd. 41°25′53″N 73°34′29″W	Brewster	1794 church, renovated after 1830, is one of the few remaining buildings from Doanesville, commercial center of eastern county prior to railroad
34	Old Southeast Town Hall	Old Southeast Town Hall	July 24, 1979 (#79001619)	Main St. 41°23′39″N 73°37′04″W	Brewster	Early yet mature Colonial Revival building with Moorish Revival touches with theatre upstairs; used today by town and community groups.
35	Oulagisket		November 23, 1982 (#82001253)	NY 9-D; 41°22′34″N 73°56′10″W	Philipstown	
36	Plumbush	Plumbush	January 30, 1992 (#82005386)	NY 9D between Peekskill and Moffet Rds. 41°25′08″N 73°56′32″W	Philipstown	Home of Robert Parker Parrott, inventor of the Parrott gun
37	Putnam County Courthouse	Putnam County Courthouse	August 11, 1976 (#76001264)	At jct. of NY 52 and NY 301; 41°25′34″N 73°40′44″W	Carmel	1814 courthouse, still used for some court offices, is second-oldest county courthouse in state still in use
38	Reed Memorial Library	Reed Memorial Library	March 28, 1980 (#80002749)	2 Brewster Ave. 41°25′19″N 73°40′42″W	Carmel	Stone Tudorbethan building erected in memory of local construction executive and benefactor; oldest library building in county
39	Rock Lawn and Carriage House	Rock Lawn and Carriage House	November 23, 1982 (#82001254)	Upper Station Rd; 41°22′51″N 73°56′41″W	Garrison	1853 Richard Upjohn house is his only Italian Villa-style house in the Hudson Highlands. Hamilton Fish II resided there in late 19th century.
40	St. Andrew's Episcopal Church	St. Andrew's Episcopal Church	November 23, 1998 (#98001427)	26 Prospect St. 41°23′51″N 73°37′02″W	Brewster	1903 Gothic Revival church built with donation from wealthy local benefactor; only stone church in eastern Putnam County
41	St. Philip's Church in the Highlands	St. Philip's Church in the Highlands	October 11, 1995 (#82005391)	NY 9D; 41°22′55″N 73°56′23″W	Garrison	1850 Richard Upjohn-designed church; second on site where congregation dates to the 1760s. Earlier church supposedly saved from destruction by Patriot mob through personal intervention of George Washington
42	Taconic State Parkway	Taconic State Parkway	December 9, 2005 (#05001398)	Linear north-south across center of county 41°24′30″N 73°47′13″W	Putnam Valley, Carmel, Kent	Scenic divided highway planned by Franklin D. Roosevelt for state park access. Built between the 1920s and early 1960s, epitomizing peak period of parkway design. Extends through Columbia, Dutchess and Westchester counties as well.
43	Walter Thompson House and Carriage House	Walter Thompson House and Carriage House	November 23, 1982 (#82001255)	Snake Hill Rd. 41°23′01″N 73°55′56″W	Philipstown	
44	Tompkins Corners United Methodist Church	Tompkins Corners United Methodist Church	March 31, 1983 (#83001759)	Peekskill Hollow Rd. 41°24′00″N 73°48′06″W	Putnam Valley	1891 church built for one of the oldest Methodist congregations in the region has unusual L shape as a result of being built on old church's foundation.
45	U.S. Military Academy	U.S. Military Academy	October 15, 1966 (#66000562)	NY 218; 41°23′43″N 73°58′18″W	West Point	Oldest continuously-operated military post in U.S., and alma mater of many notable American generals and Army officers.
46	Valhalla Highlands Historic District		November 12, 2014 (#14000915)	Roughly Highland Rd., Locust, Lookout & Mountainview Drs. 41°28′44″N 73°55′40″W	Cold Spring vicinity	Vacation community established by German/Austrian and Norwegian communities from New York City with many fine rustic wood and stone houses.
47	Walker House	Walker House	November 23, 1982 (#82001256)	Cat Rock Rd. 41°22′23″N 73°56′02″W	Garrison	1890 Queen Anne given by rail magnate Samuel Sloan to his daughter
48	West Point Foundry	West Point Foundry	April 11, 1973 (#73001250)	Foundry Cove between NY 90 and NY Central RR tracks 41°24′51″N 73°57′12″W	Cold Spring	Makers of cannon for U.S. Army through 19th century; director was Robert Parrott. Major reason for growth of Cold Spring and Nelsonville
49	West Point Foundry Archeological Site		February 25, 2010 (#10000059)	Kemble Ave. 41°24′51″N 73°57′11″W	Cold Spring	Designated a National Historic Landmark in 2021.
50	Wilson House	Wilson House	November 23, 1982 (#82001257)	Lower Station Rd. 41°22′35″N 73°56′50″W	Garrison	Mid-19th century cottage has finest Carpenter Gothic detailing in the Hudson Highlands
51	Woodlawn	Woodlawn	November 23, 1982 (#82001258)	NY 9-D; 41°23′28″N 73°56′16″W	Garrison	1854 Richard Upjohn estate house on river, later used as school and now home of the Hastings Center

== See also ==
- National Register of Historic Places listings in New York
