= Glenfields =

Glenfields can refer to:

- Glenfields, Leicestershire, England, a civil parish containing the village of Glenfield
- Glenfields (Philipstown, New York), United States, listed historic building

== See also ==
- Glenfield (disambiguation)
