= House at 249 Main Street =

Historic house in New York, United States

- U.S. National Register of Historic Places
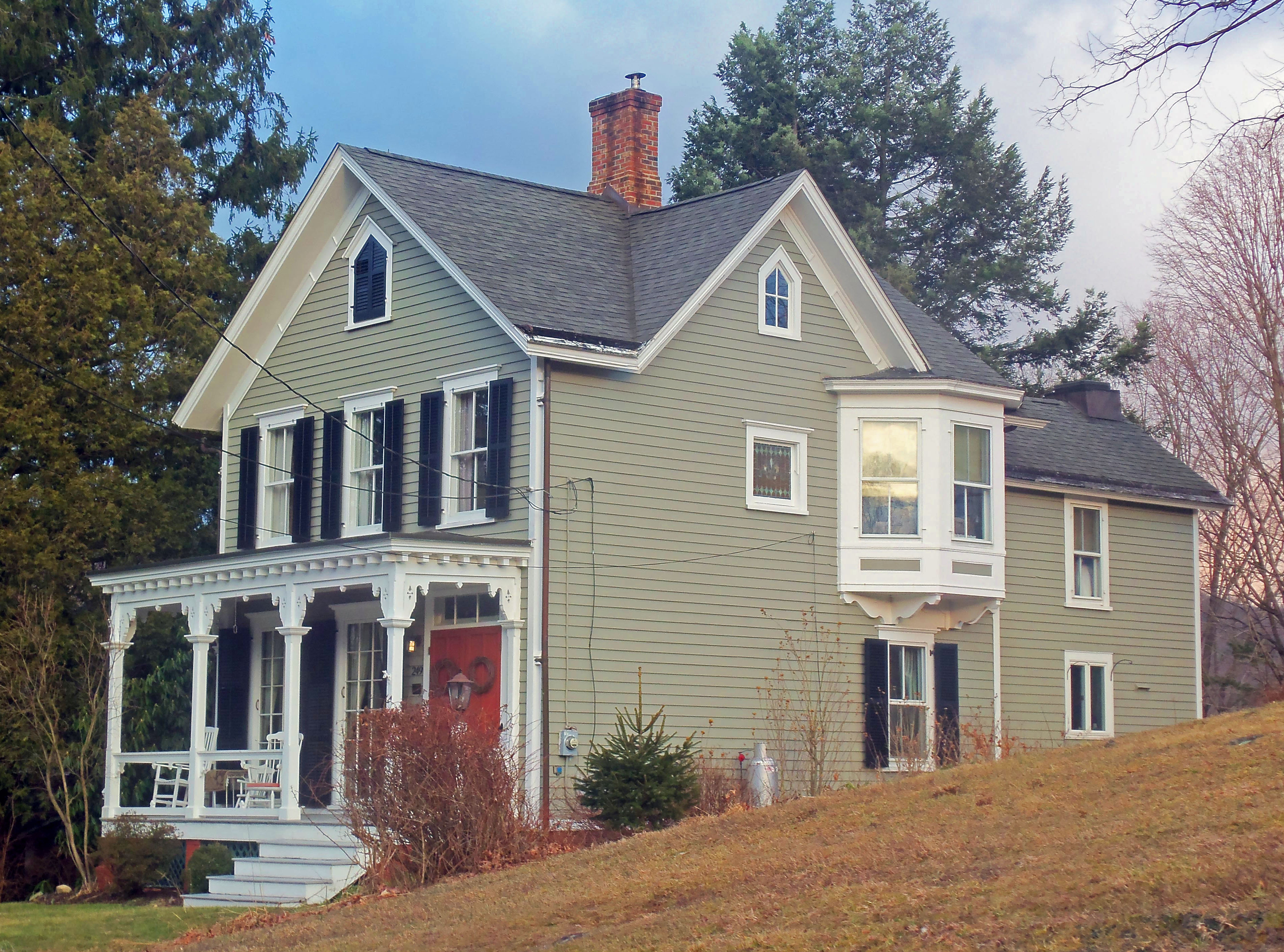
- North elevation and west profile, 2013
- Location: Nelsonville, New York
- Nearest city: Newburgh
- Coordinates: 41°25′23″N 73°56′57″W
- Area: 0.3 acres (0.12 ha)
- Built: ca. 1870
- Architectural style: Italianate, Carpenter Gothic
- MPS: Hudson Highlands MRA
- NRHP reference No.: 82005382
- Added to NRHP: July 31, 1989

The house at 249 Main Street (New York State Route 301), Nelsonville, New York, United States, was listed on the National Register of Historic Places in 1982 as part of the Hudson Highlands Multiple Resource Area. It was built around 1870 and combines aspects of the Italianate and Carpenter Gothic architectural styles which were prevalent at that time.

It is a two-story clapboard-sided wood-frame structure on a brick foundation, located next to First Baptist Church of Cold Spring on the western end of the small village. It has intersecting gable roofs, with paneled frieze and decorative vergeboards.

In the apex of the gables on all but the south side is a pointed arch window. An oriel window projects from the west wall, echoing a two-story projecting bay on the east. Across the first story of the northern (front) facade is a full porch. In the rear is an offset two-story frame wing with similar gabled roof and vergeboard treatment. It has a small shed-roofed porch of its own on its east.

The house is first recorded on a 1912 tax map of the village. Its date of construction is given by the assessor as approximately 1870. It does not appear to have been substantially altered since its construction. The west wing of the house, for example, still maintains its service staircase, linking what was once the staff quarters with the kitchen. There is original stained glass throughout.

== See also ==
- National Register of Historic Places listings in Putnam County, New York
