= Glenfield =

Glenfield may refer to:

== Australia ==
- Glenfield, New South Wales, a suburb of Sydney
- Glenfield Park, New South Wales, a suburb of Wagga Wagga
- Glenfield, Western Australia

== New Zealand ==
- Glenfield, New Zealand
- Glenfield (New Zealand electorate), a former parliamentary electorate, 1984–1996

== United Kingdom ==
- Glenfield, Leicestershire
- Glenfield (company) a valve business

== United States ==
- Glenfield Park, New Jersey
- Glenfield, North Dakota
- Glenfield, Mississippi, a listed Mississippi Landmark
- Glenfield, Pennsylvania

== See also ==
- Glenfields (Philipstown, New York), historic building
- Glenfield railway station (disambiguation)
