= River View =

River View may refer to:

- The River View, a historic home in Oakley, Maryland
- River View, Alabama, a subdivision of Valley, Alabama
- River View, North Carolina
- River View House, a historic home located in Cornwall, New York

== See also ==
- Riverview (disambiguation)
