= Camp Olmsted =

Camp Olmsted may refer to:

- Camp Olmsted (New York), a Five Points Mission summer camp and retreat in Cornwall-on-Hudson
- Camp Olmsted (Pennsylvania), a Boy Scouts of America camp
- Camp Olmsted (Virginia), part of Goshen Scout Reservation
