= St. Mark's Episcopal Church (Fort Montgomery, New York) =

Historic church in New York, United States

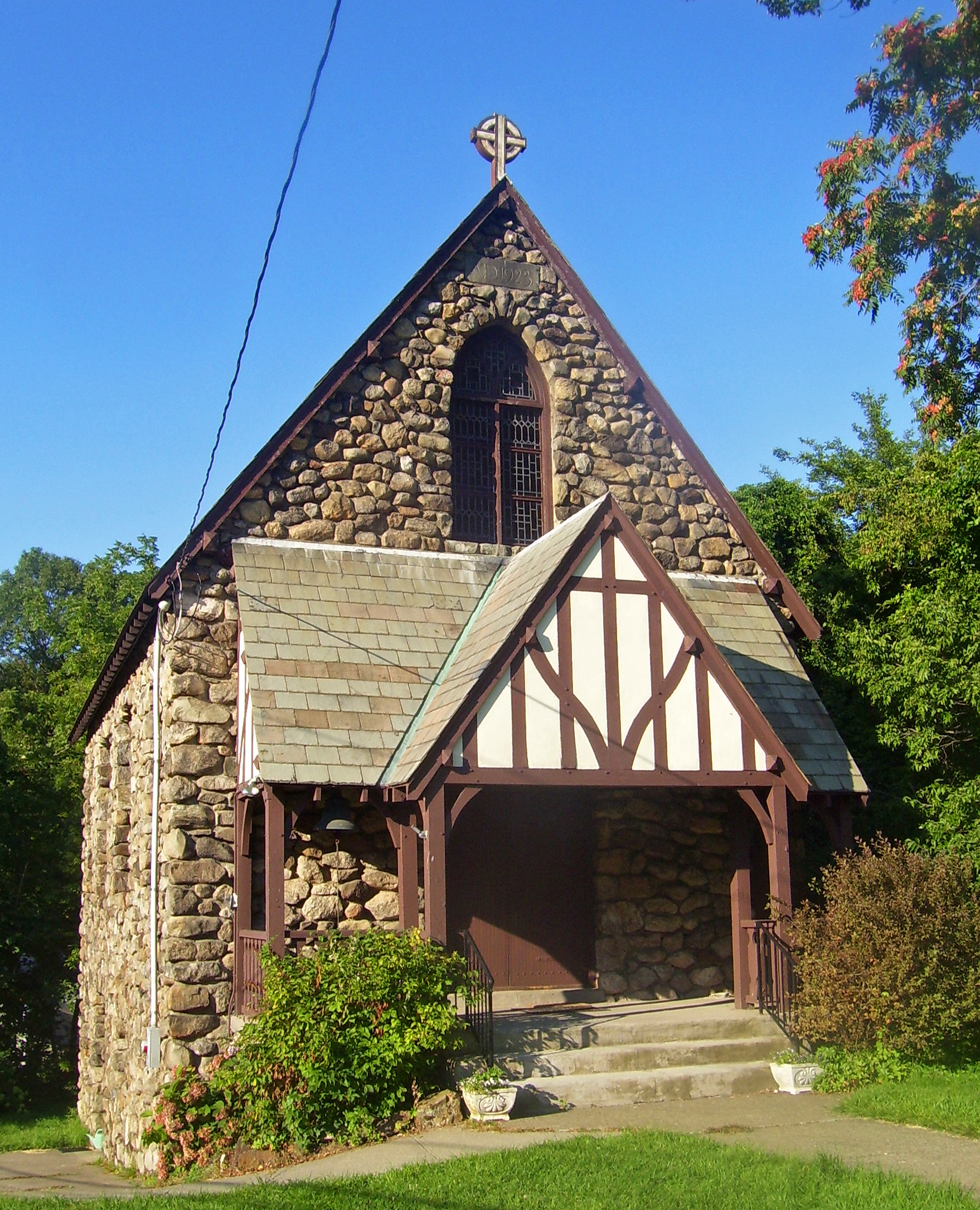
- North elevation and east profile, 2008

Religion
- Affiliation: Episcopal Church in the United States of America
- Status: chapel

Location
- Location: Fort Montgomery, NY, USA
- Interactive map of St. Mark's Episcopal Church
- Coordinates: 41°19′48″N 73°59′15″W

Architecture
- Type: chapel
- Style: Tudorbethan

Specifications
- Direction of façade: North
- Materials: Wood, stucco, cobblestone

U.S. National Register of Historic Places
- Added to NRHP: November 23, 1982
- NRHP Reference no.: 82001227

St. Mark's Episcopal Church is located on US 9W in the hamlet of Fort Montgomery, New York, United States. It is a small building in the Tudorbethan architectural style, with random stone and lancet stained glass windows on either side.

It was built in 1923 in anticipation of the completion of the Bear Mountain Bridge and the bridge over Popolopen Creek to the south. It served the many weekend travelers and vacationers who came into the area once it became more accessible when those bridges opened the next year. In 1982 it was listed on the National Register of Historic Places as part of the Hudson Highlands Multiple Resource Area multiple property submission.

== See also ==
- National Register of Historic Places listings in Orange County, New York
