= Montrest =

Historic house in New York, United States

- U.S. National Register of Historic Places
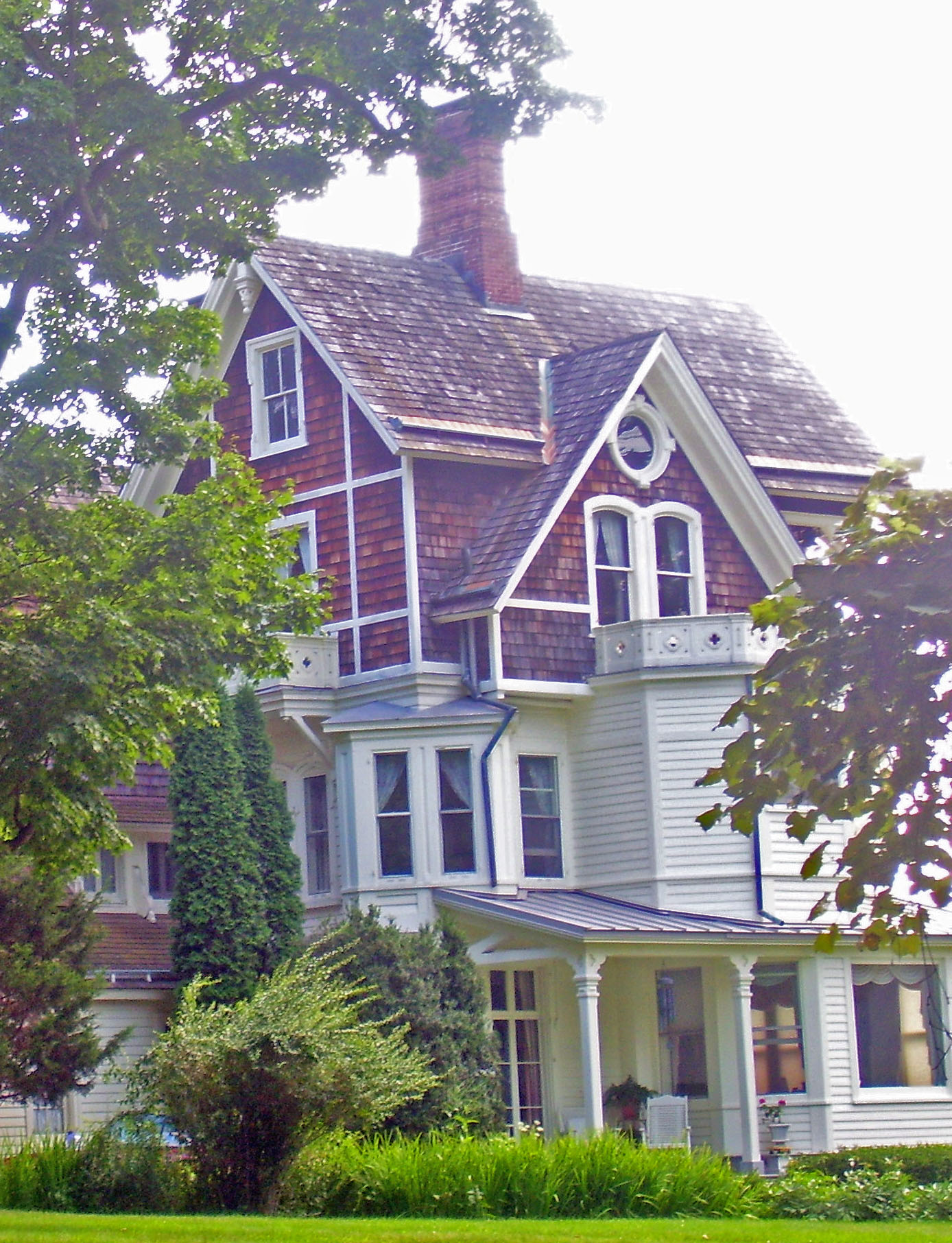
- North elevation of main house, 2008
- Location: Nelsonville, New York
- Nearest city: Newburgh
- Coordinates: 41°25′35″N 73°56′01″W
- Area: 160 acres (65 ha)
- Built: 1868
- Architect: Arthur Raymond, William LaDue
- Architectural style: Gothic Revival
- MPS: Hudson Highlands MRA
- NRHP reference No.: 82001252
- Added to NRHP: November 23, 1982

Montrest is a house on Lane Gate Road outside Nelsonville, New York, United States. It was built after the Civil War as a summer residence by Aaron Healy, a successful New York leather dealer, to take advantage of panoramic views of the Hudson River and surrounding mountains of the Highlands.

Eventually he divided the estate between his two sons, and in the early 20th century Montrest, the upper house, became the family's primary residence. In 1982 it was listed on the National Register of Historic Places.

== Property ==
The Montrest property has been expanded over the years by the Healy family to 160 acres (65 ha) straddling Lane Gate, a dirt road climbing into the hills of Philipstown above the village of Nelsonville. The land gently slopes downward, revealing views of the Hudson, Bull Hill and Storm King Mountain to the west.

There are a number of buildings on the property. The main house is a two-and-a-half-story frame building sided in brown and white shingles. It has four intersecting gables on top, a projecting three-story bay with gabled roof on the west side and a two-bay one-story eastern wing. The ground level of the front also has a full veranda with porte-cochere.

Downhill a cluster of buildings centers on the farm superintendent's cottage, a one-and-a-half-story frame structure on stone foundation in a similar Gothic style to the main house. Its gabled roof is crossed on its eastern side by a later extension. Small octagonal windows are in the apex of the front and rear gables. The main entrance is located underneath a cusped arch gable with protruding dormer. Two pointed arch windows form a gabled dormer on the west side, and a porch with scalloped frieze is attached to the northwest corner.

To the cottage's west is a stone-and-frame greenhouse and potting shed. It is not currently in use but was built for an expansion of farming operations at the turn of the 20th century. To the south are some old barns.

At the intersection of Lane Gate and the main driveway is the carriage house/stable complex. It is a one-and-a-half -story board-and-batten-sided house on a stone foundation with gabled asphalt roof pierced centrally by a brick chimney. The second story has three small eyebrow windows below the roof overhang. Two extensions project from the west.

On the east of Lane Gate is a tenant house, a two-story L-shaped frame building with a raised stone basement sided in shingles as well. A veranda wraps around the front, supported by four piers with decorative corner brackets. To the east is a clapboard-sided, gable-roofed asphalt-shingled garage.

== History ==
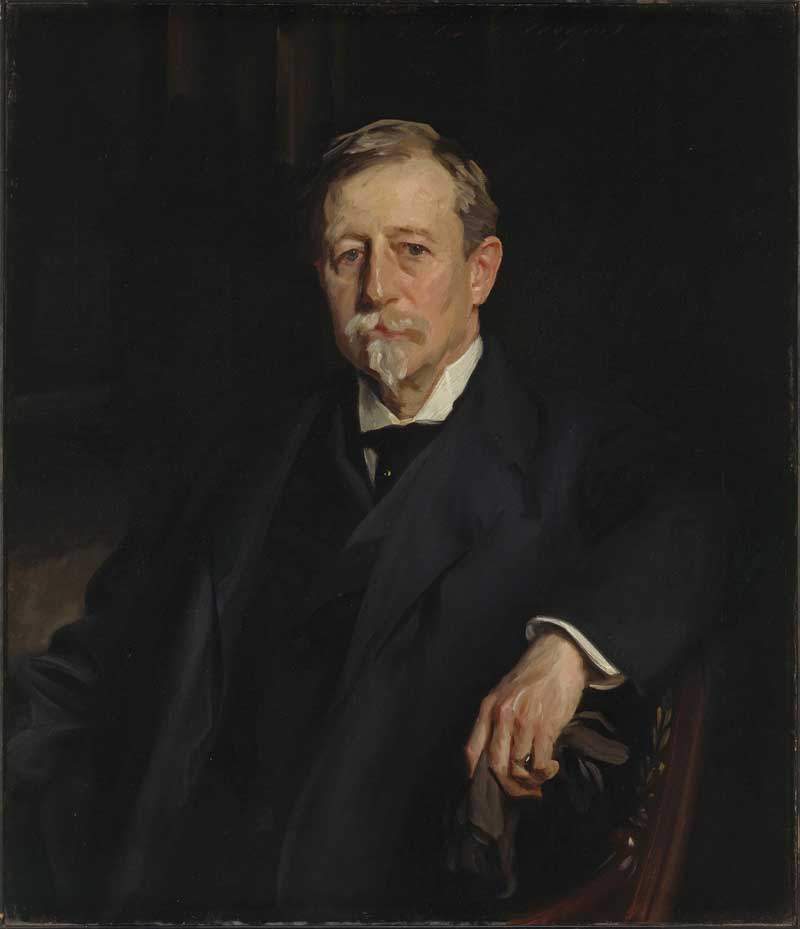
Aaron Augustus Healy, John Singer Sargent, 1907

Healy acquired the property in 1867 and commissioned the estate the following year. In 1885 he divided the property between his sons Augustus and Frank, with Augustus taking the lower half and building a house called Breeze Lawn, no longer extant.

Around 1900 Frank Healy had several buildings on Montrest expanded by architect Alfred Raymond to support increased farm operations. The greenhouse and tenant house, as well as a chicken coop and corn crib, were built then. By the 1930s automobiles had totally displaced horse travel, and the carriage house was remodeled accordingly, with some additions to allow it to be used as a residence.

In 1947 the main house underwent major renovations to allow the Healy family to make it their full-time residence. Among other changes, an indoor laundry room was converted to a two-car garage and storage space. Libby Healy, great-granddaughter of Aaron, still lives in the house. She has added to the property and acquired conservation easements on neighboring parcels in the hope that some of the hiking trails on them will eventually be able to be reopened to the public.
