= LeDoux/Healey House =

Historic house in New York, United States

- U.S. National Register of Historic Places
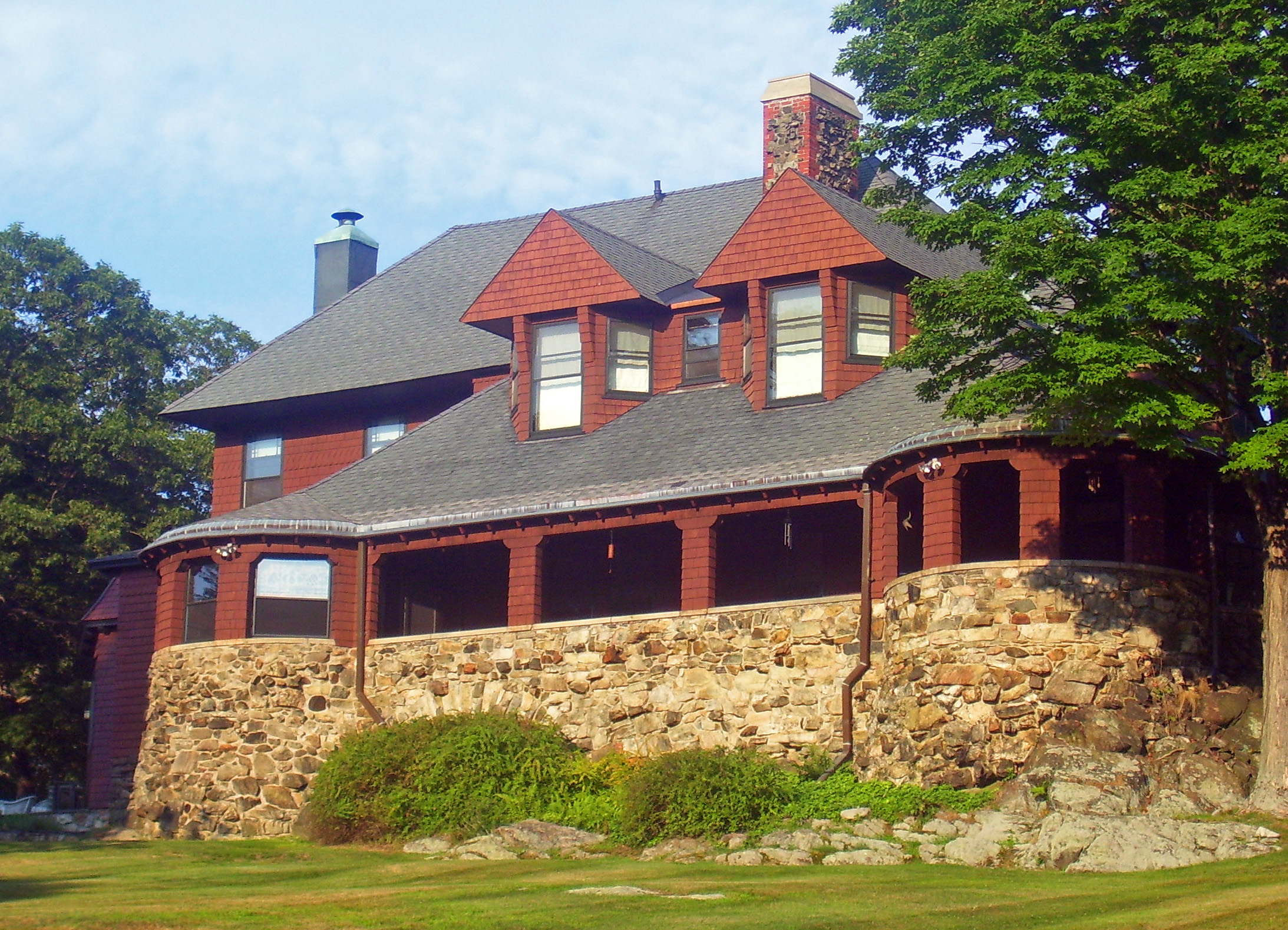
- West (rear) elevation, 2008
- Location: Cornwall on Hudson, NY
- Nearest city: Newburgh
- Coordinates: 41°25′27″N 74°01′03″W
- Built: ca. 1890
- Architect: Mead and Taft
- Architectural style: Shingle style
- MPS: Hudson Highlands MRA
- NRHP reference No.: 82001222
- Added to NRHP: 1982

The LeDoux/Healey House is located on Deer Hill Road in Cornwall on Hudson, New York, United States. It was built around 1890 for a daughter of Lyman Abbott who was a summer resident of the area. It is considered a good example of the Shingle style and was renovated and expanded by later owners. In 1982 it was listed on the National Register of Historic Places.

The house is situated near the top of Deer Hill, a wooded area that is the highest point in the village. There are views to the Hudson River. It is a two-story hip-roofed shingle-sided frame building with polygonal and gabled dormer windows on its upper story. The west facade has a full-length stone veranda with shingled pillars, leading to an enclosed porch on the southern end. On the east, a small hipped roof overhangs an original Dutch door. Many original finishings and trim remain inside as well.

It was built around 1890 by the local firm of Mead and Taft as a summer residence during a time when Cornwall was becoming popular with New York City residents as a place to escape the heat in the summer. The architect is unknown. Its second owner greatly expanded it into its present form. Afterwards it became part of an estate. The carriage house renovated and expanded into a separate residence in 1972. It has remained a private house throughout its existence.
