= Gatehouse on Deerhill Road =

- U.S. National Register of Historic Places
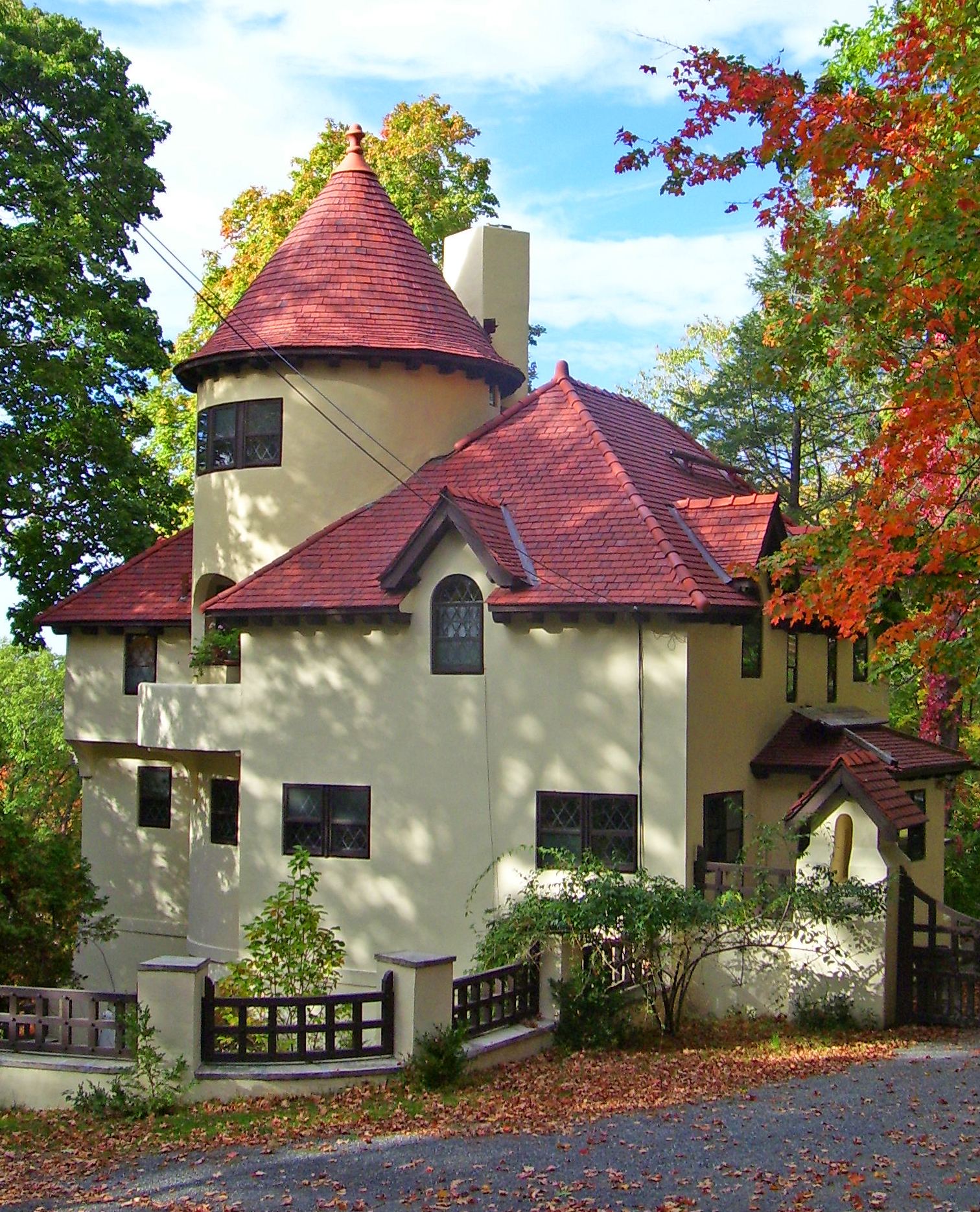
- House in 2007
- Location: Cornwall on Hudson, NY
- Nearest city: Newburgh
- Coordinates: 41°25′29″N 74°01′08″W
- Built: mid-1880s
- Architectural style: Norman
- MPS: Hudson Highlands MRA
- NRHP reference No.: 82001217
- Added to NRHP: 1982

The Gatehouse on Deerhill Road is located on that street in the village of Cornwall on Hudson, New York, United States. It is a one-and-a-half-story stucco building in the Norman style with a tiled roof and three-story tower, with balcony. The east facade has an entrance pavilion.

It was originally intended to be part of an estate with a large mansion, but that was never built. Eventually a smaller home was built by the Pagenstecher family, when they purchased the property in the 1920s. That house was in turn demolished in 1966, and two nieces of the Pagenstechers took up residence in the gates. It was added to the National Register of Historic Places in 1982 as a rare example of a castellated gatehouse in the Hudson Highlands. Many of the Norman-style interior appointments remain.
