= House at 20 Center Street =

Historic house in New York, United States

- House at 37 Center Street
- U.S. National Register of Historic Places
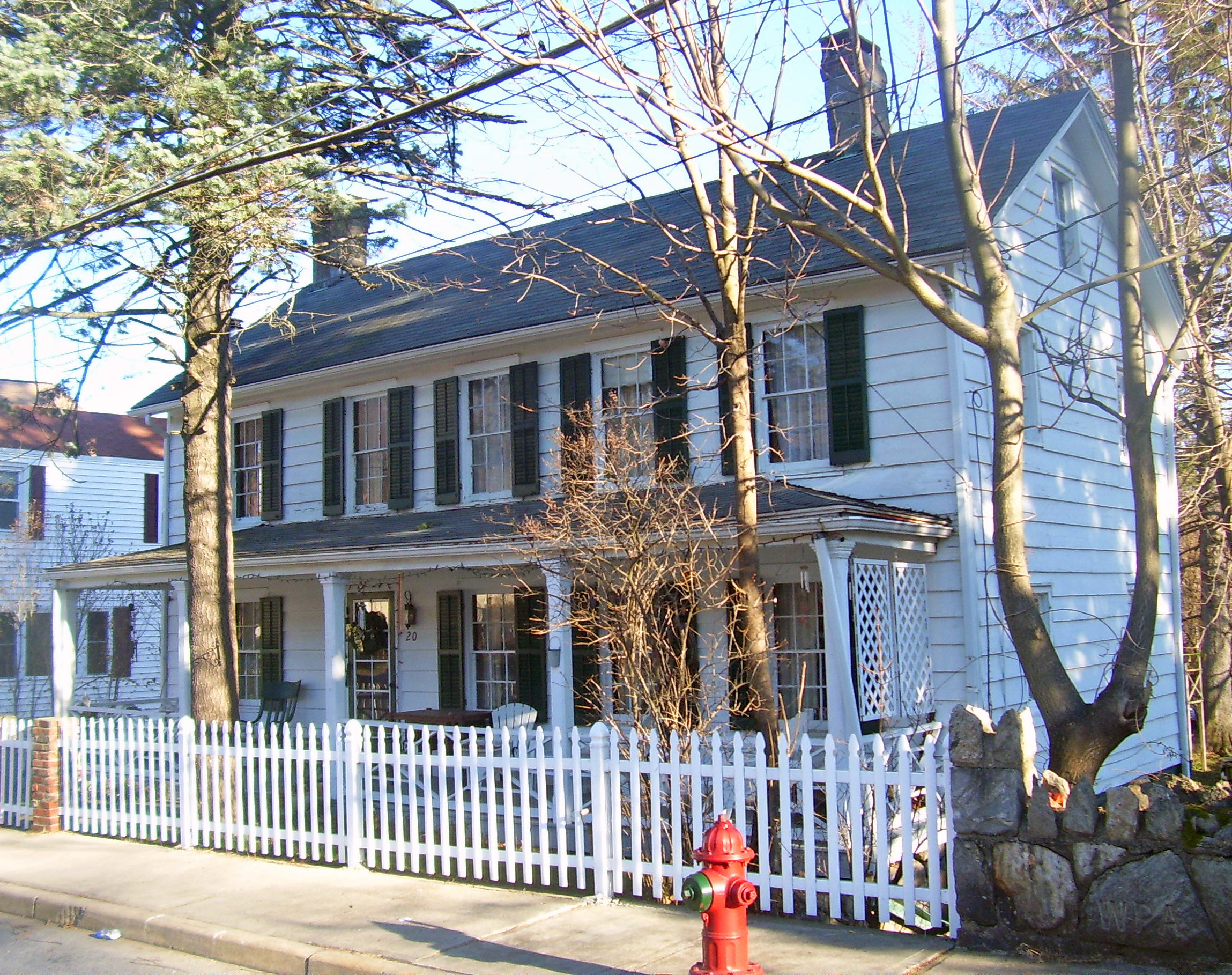
- West elevation and south profile, 2008

- Location within New York Location within the United States
- Location: Highland Falls, NY
- Nearest city: Peekskill
- Coordinates: 41°22′11″N 73°58′3″W
- Built: ca. 1850
- Architectural style: Greek Revival
- MPS: Hudson Highlands MRA
- NRHP reference No.: 82001220
- Added to NRHP: November 23, 1982

The house at 20 Center Street, formerly 37 Center Street, in Highland Falls, New York, United States is a frame house built in the mid-19th century in the Greek Revival architectural style.

It is one of the few Greek Revival houses, and the highest in style, in the Hudson Highlands. In 1982 it was listed on the National Register of Historic Places.

== Building ==
The house is located on the east side of Center Street, a half-block north of Mountain Avenue (state highway NY 218) and a block west of downtown Highland Falls. To the north and south are other houses, many dating from the same era or earlier, albeit modified over time. On the west of the street the ground rises to athletic fields and then Highland Falls Middle School. It is on a small lot with a picket fence along the sidewalk

The building itself is a five-by-two-bay two-and-a-half-story clapboard-sided house on a fieldstone foundation. Atop is a side-gabled roof with asphalt shingles pierced by brick chimneys at either end. A full-length porch with decorative piers and railing is on the first story of the west (front) facade.

== History ==
The house is first recorded on an 1875 map with the initials "BK", for Bernard Kenney, its owner. Its minimal architectural detailing, particular the plain sills and lintels, link it to other nearby houses in the area built around 1850 or earlier, the oldest grouping of houses in the village. The house at 20 Center Street stands out because no other Greek Revival house in the Hudson Highlands expresses the style so fully.

It has remained a private residence since the time of its construction. Few changes have been made to it. The front picket fence was added since 1982, and it became 20 Center Street at the end of the 20th century when many streets in the county were renumbered for 9-1-1 service.

== See also ==
- National Register of Historic Places in Orange County, New York
