= Fish and Fur Club =

- U.S. National Register of Historic Places
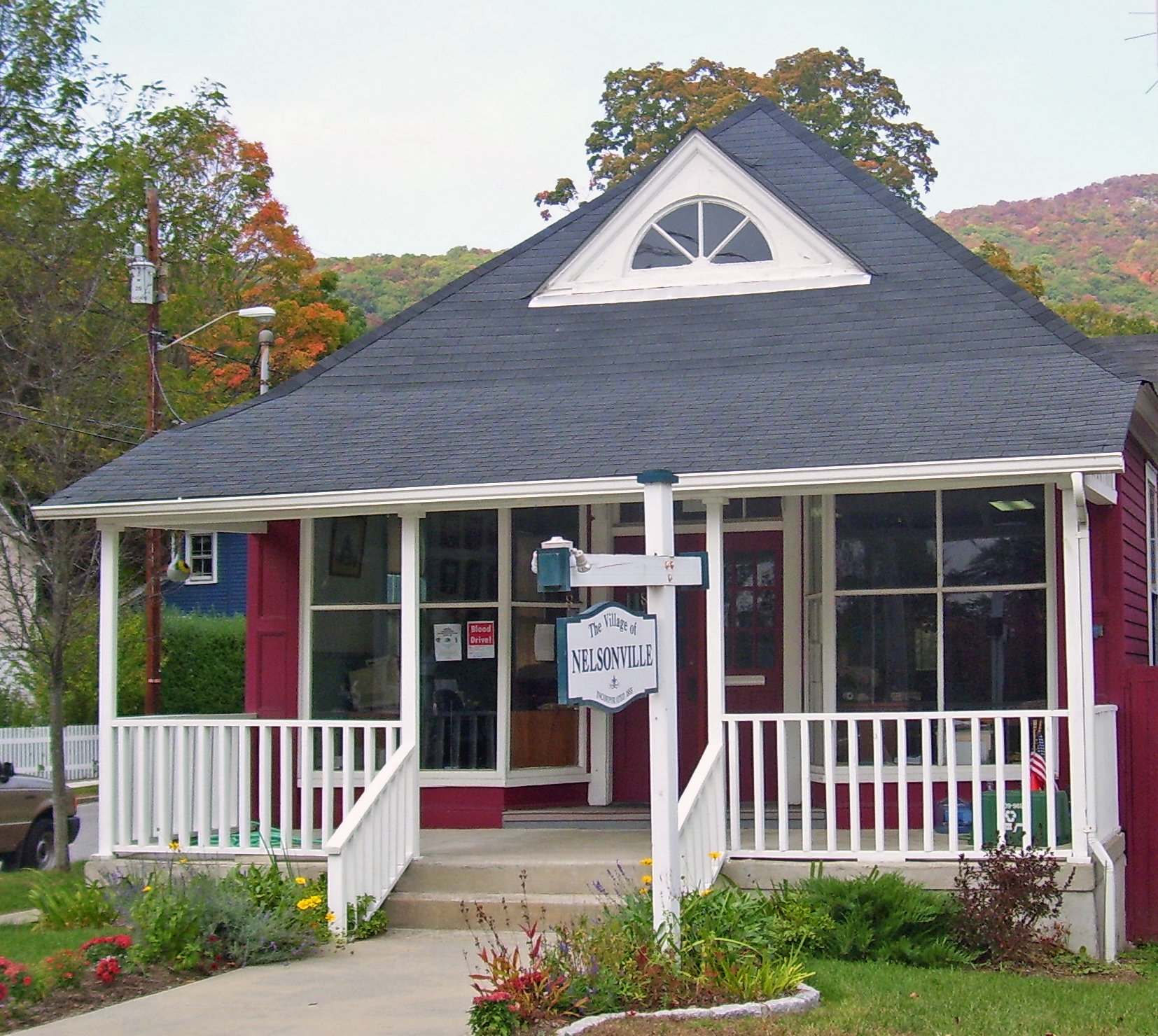
- Front (south) elevation, 2007

- Location within New York Location within the United States
- Interactive map showing the location of Fish and Fur Club
- Location: Nelsonville, NY
- Nearest city: Beacon
- Coordinates: 41°25′25″N 73°56′55″W
- Area: 0.1 acres (0.040 ha)
- Built: 1905
- Architect: Martin Adams (builder)
- MPS: Hudson Highlands MRA
- NRHP reference No.: 82001242
- Added to NRHP: November 23, 1982

The original Fish and Fur Club building is at Main (NY 301) and Pearl Streets in Nelsonville, New York, United States. It is now used as Nelsonville's village hall. In 1982 it was added to the National Register of Historic Places (NRHP).

It is a single-story three-by-three-bay wood frame building on a stone foundation. An asphalt-shingled hipped roof is pierced in the front by a triangular dormer with a semicircular window. On the front is a poured-concrete porch with wooden posts and railings, leading to the main entrance, a recessed, panelled and glazed double door with a three-part transom. It is flanked by two wood-framed glass bay windows.

== History ==
The club was organized in 1895 by local outdoor sportsmen, who hunted, trapped and fished in the nearby Hudson River and Hudson Highlands. They met first at the home of one member, next to a local blacksmith's shop, then in another building at Main and Division streets. They decided to buy land for a clubhouse of their own, and bought the current parcel in spring 1905. Bonds bought by every member financed the $1,500 ($35,944 in 2008 dollars) cost of the construction by local builder Martin Adams. It opened in November with a coon supper for members and their families.

The building would soon come to be of central importance in the community. In 1923 the Nelsonville Fire Department held its first formal meeting in the club's rooms. It would meet there until the construction of its own firehouse down the street in 1955. In that year the club moved into a new annex to the east, and the village began using the original clubhouse as its justice court, the office of the village clerk and meeting room for the Village Board.

Reflecting its members interests, the original building's porch railings and posts were wood of an unfinished, rustic character, an unusual choice in the region. Those were cited as its chief source of architectural significance in its nomination to the NRHP, but have since been replaced with molded wood painted white.

In 2001 volunteers and the village began a $15,000 project to renovate the annex, which had fallen into a state of disrepair. It was completely gutted, with new walls, floors and windows installed. New heating and cooling was added, as well as a new septic system for both it and the village hall.
