= House at 3 Crown Street =

Historic house in New York, United States

- U.S. National Register of Historic Places
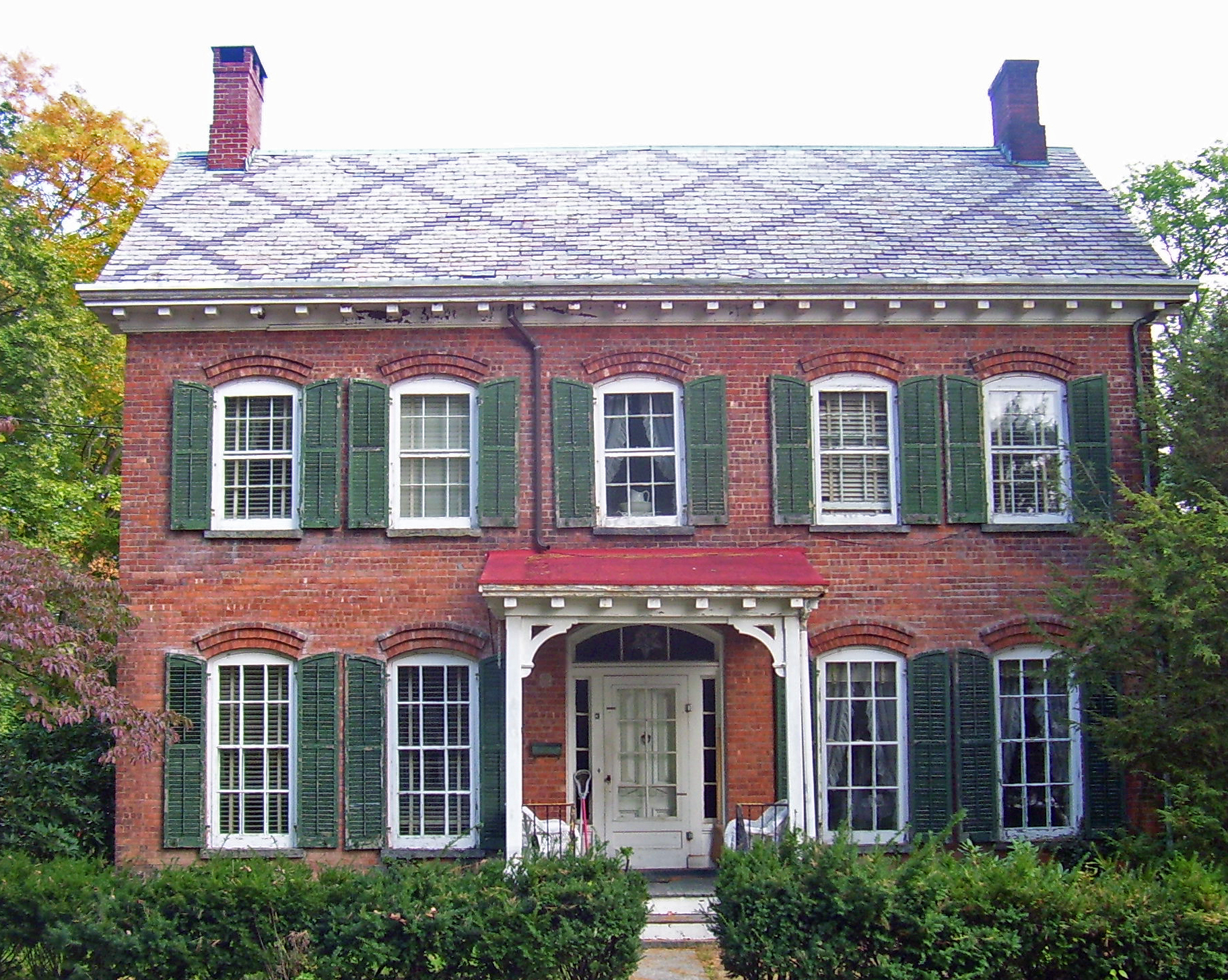
- Front (west) elevation, 2007
- Location: Nelsonville, NY
- Nearest city: Beacon
- Coordinates: 41°25′25″N 73°57′00″W
- Area: 0.2 acres (0.081 ha)
- Built: 1868
- Architect: E. Ferris
- Architectural style: Italianate
- MPS: Hudson Highlands MRA
- NRHP reference No.: 82001246
- Added to NRHP: November 23, 1982

The house at 3 Crown Street in Nelsonville, New York, United States is located at the corner of Crown—a short side street—and Secor Street. It is a 19th-century brick home that was added to the National Register of Historic Places in 1982 as "the finest mid-century Italianate structure in the area."

It is a two-story, five-bay brick house on a stone foundation. The central doorway, behind a shed-roofed porch with two decorative piers, has an arched transom and four-paneled sidelights. Windows have segmented arched brick lintels and shutters. The gabled roofline is distinguished by a modillioned cornice, and is pierced by two brick chimneys on the south and one large one at a cross-gable on the north. A rear wing was added later.

Local property tax records suggest the house was built in 1868. It is absent from the 1897 first map of Nelsonville but appears on the 1876 version, identifying its owner as J. and B. Secor. Local builder E. Ferris—with whom Secor co-owned another property in town—is noted as being active in that area of the village on the earlier map, and considered likely to have built 3 Crown Street.

Since the Secors, the house has been through a number of owners, mainly physicians, who have collectively made very little change to the house.

== See also ==
- National Register of Historic Places listings in Putnam County, New York
