= Highland Falls Village Hall =

Historic commercial building in New York, United States

- U.S. National Register of Historic Places
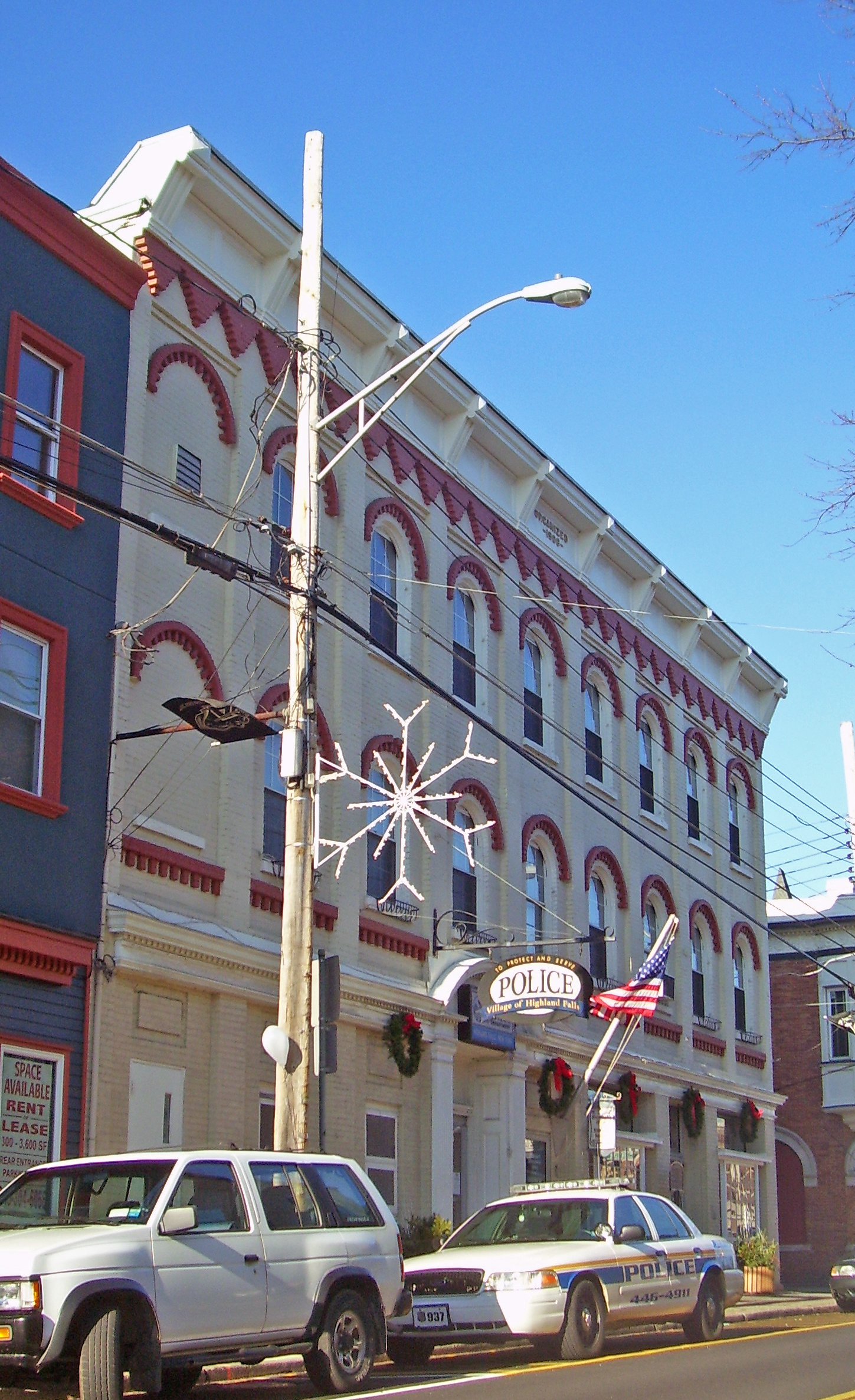
- East elevation, 2008

- Location within New York Location within the United States
- Location: Highland Falls, NY
- Coordinates: 41°22′15″N 73°57′57″W
- Built: 1894
- Architectural style: Italianate
- MPS: Hudson Highlands MRA
- NRHP reference No.: 82001219
- Added to NRHP: November 23, 1982

The Highland Falls Village Hall is located on Main Street in Highland Falls, New York, United States. It is a three-story Italianate-style brick buildings erected about 1894.

Originally it housed a bank for many years. It became the village hall in 1967. It was listed on the National Register of Historic Places in 1982.

== Building ==
The village hall is located at the southwest corner of the intersection of Main Street and Schneider Avenue in the densely developed downtown section of Highland Falls. It is a three-story, nine-by-nine-bay brick structure with a flat roof. There are glass storefronts at street level north of the centrally located main entrance, round-arched and supported by fluted pilasters.

A dentiled cornice separates the first and second stories. The windows on the second and third stories are framed by projecting round brick arches, with the southernmost bays on both stories bricked in. Pilasters run the full height of the building to triangular brick corbels below a slightly elevated bracketed cornice. The north elevation, along Schneider, has similar windows, with the first floor's offset slightly to the west to accommodate one of the storefronts.

== History ==
The exact year of the building's construction, and its original purpose, is not known. A brick building is shown at the site on maps from 1859 and 1875, but not 1891. The local tax assessor dates the building to 1894.

In 1907, records show that a Mr. Kreutz sold the building to the First National Bank of Highland Falls. At that time alterations were made to the exterior. Storefronts were added and the southernmost upper windows bricked in.

Later First National became part of Marine Midland Bank. In 1967 the village acquired the property. It has used it ever since, without any significant alterations.

== See also ==
- National Register of Historic Places listings in Orange County, New York
