= Webb Lane House =

Historic house in New York, United States

- U.S. National Register of Historic Places
- Location within New York Location within the United States
- Location: Webb Lane, Highland Falls, New York
- Coordinates: 41°22′14″N 73°57′44″W
- Area: 0.5 acres (0.20 ha)
- Built: 1903
- Architectural style: Picturesque Eclectic
- MPS: Hudson Highlands MRA
- NRHP reference No.: 82001230
- Added to NRHP: November 23, 1982

Webb Lane House is a historic home located at Highland Falls in Orange County, New York. It was built in 1903 and is a two-story brick and stucco dwelling with a hipped roof and deep overhang supported by massive paired brackets. It features an engaged three story tower and a porch supported by heavy timbers. The home has been converted to apartments.

It was listed on the National Register of Historic Places in 1982.
