= Parry House (Highland Falls, New York) =

Historic house in New York, United States

- U.S. National Register of Historic Places
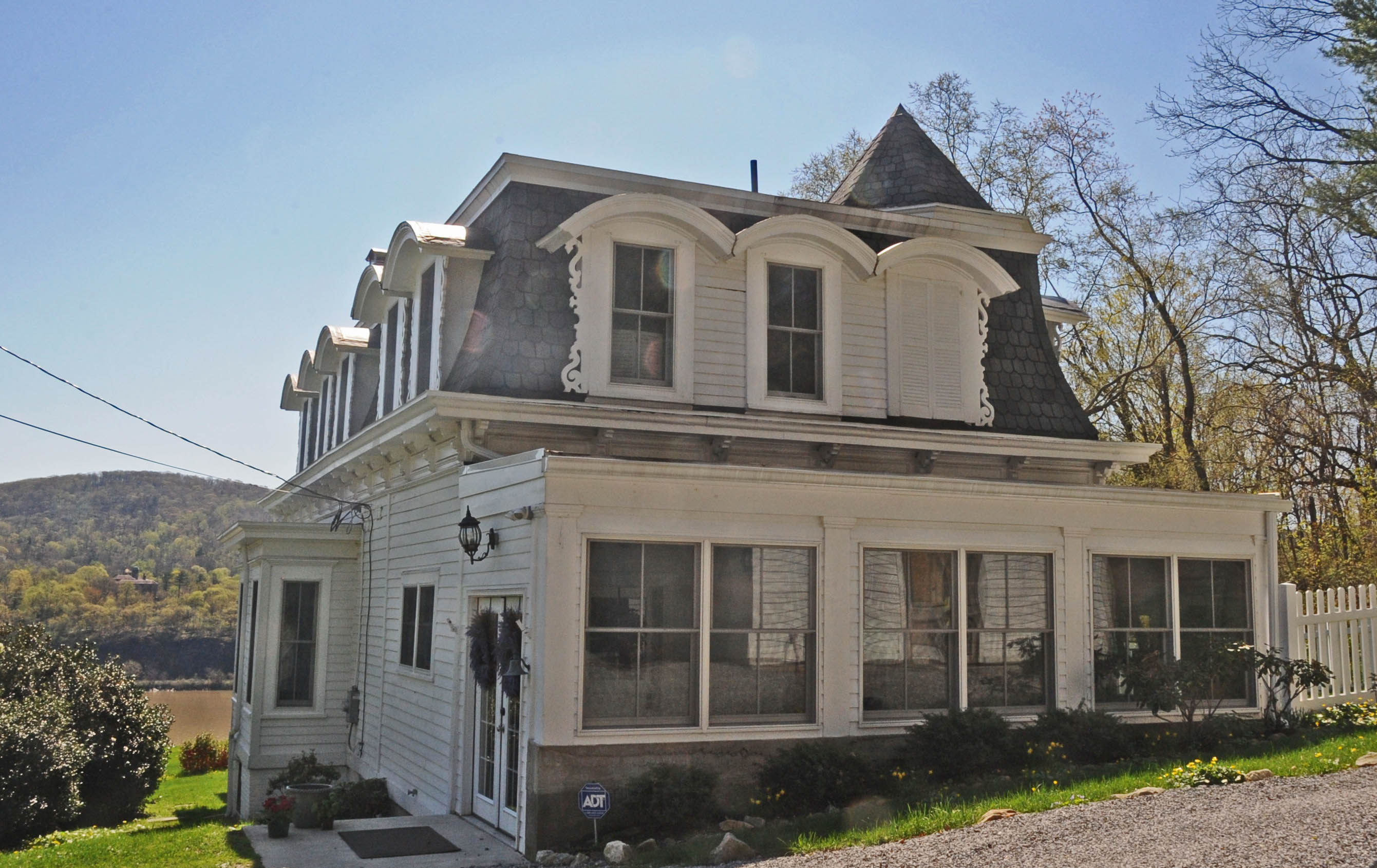

- Location within New York Location within the United States
- Location: Michel Rd., Highland Falls, New York
- Coordinates: 41°22′9″N 73°57′45″W
- Area: 0.6 acres (0.24 ha)
- Built: 1860
- Architectural style: Second Empire
- MPS: Hudson Highlands MRA
- NRHP reference No.: 82001223
- Added to NRHP: November 23, 1982

Parry House is a historic home located at Highland Falls in Orange County, New York. It was built about 1860 and is a two-story frame dwelling on a brick foundation. It features a slate mansard roof with concave or bell cast sides in the Second Empire style.

It was listed on the National Register of Historic Places in 1982.
