= Amelia Barr House =

Historic house in New York, United States

- U.S. National Register of Historic Places
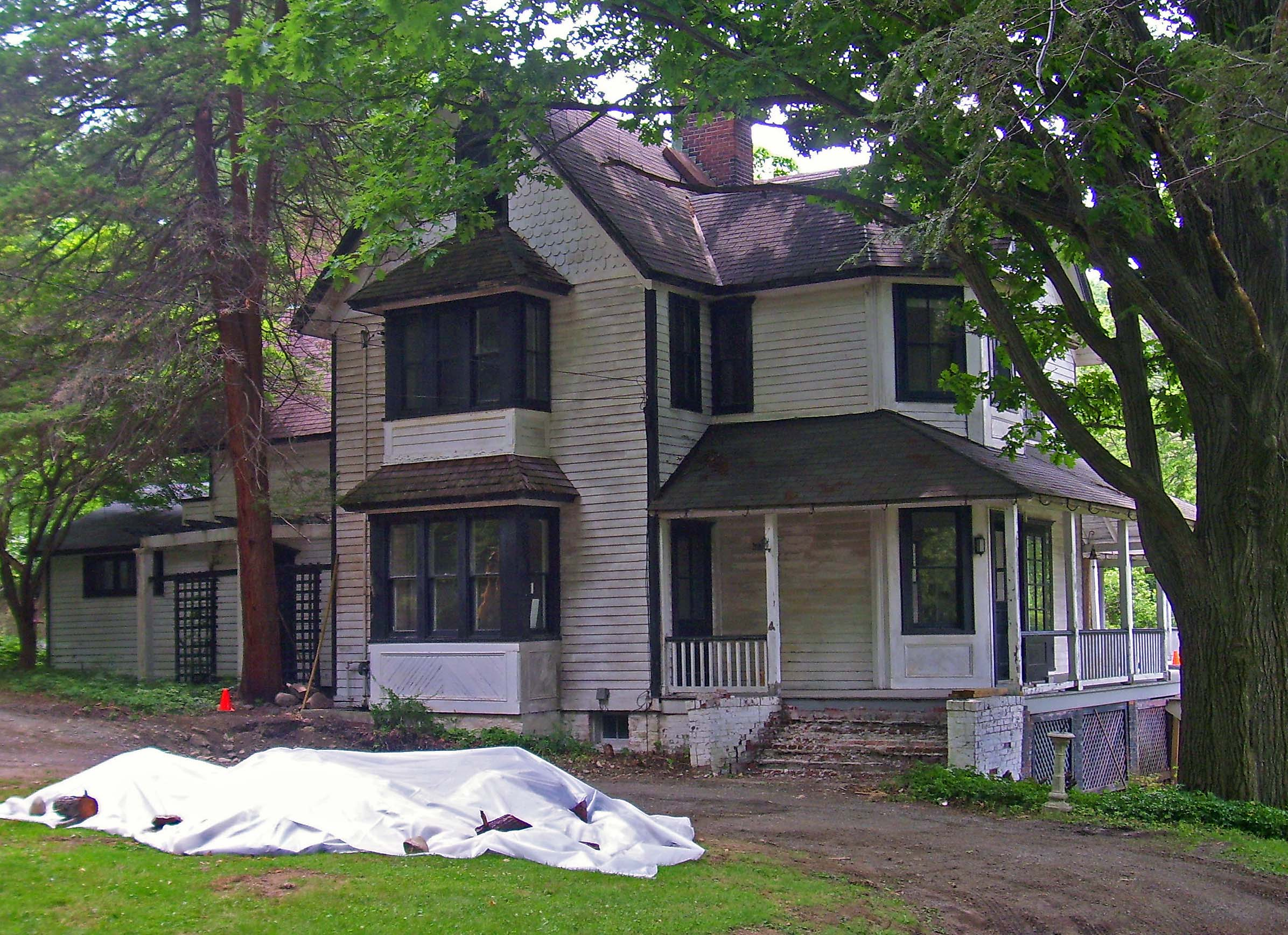
- The house, vacant and undergoing renovation, in 2007

- Location within New York Location within the United States
- Location: Mountain Road, Cornwall on Hudson, NY
- Nearest city: Newburgh
- Coordinates: 41°25′36″N 74°00′43″W
- Area: 2.6 acres (1.1 ha)
- Built: 1881 (substantially renovated 1891)
- Architect: Mead and Taft
- MPS: Hudson Highlands MRA
- NRHP reference No.: 82001211
- Added to NRHP: November 23, 1982

The Amelia Barr House, also known as Cherry Croft, is located on Mountain Road in Cornwall on Hudson, a village in Orange County, New York, United States. It is on the slopes of Storm King Mountain, near Storm King School. Barr, the most published American female writer born in the 19th century, lived here during the most prolific and successful period of her career.

Barr, an Englishwoman who came to the United States from Lancashire at the age of 19, moved to New York City in the early 1870s with her daughters from Galveston, Texas, after her husband and six of her nine children died of yellow fever. There she began to write fiction. In 1885, she and her daughters began spending summers at a boardinghouse in Cornwall. Her novels eventually became successful enough that, in 1891, she could afford to buy the cottage, previously rented by artist Abbot Handerson Thayer. After highly regarded local builders Mead and Taft renovated it extensively, she renamed it Cherry Croft, and accordingly most of her work from that time period came to be known as the Cherry Croft novels. She summered there until selling it in 1915, when she moved to White Plains to be cared for by her daughter Lilly.

Mead and White's renovations resulted in a 3,500-square foot (315 m^{2}) three-storey home with six bedrooms, four bathrooms, library, living room and dining room. It has a 1,000-square foot (90 m^{2}) wraparound porch. Barr had a turreted writing room added on upstairs for her use. The original fixtures and trim, including the window screens, are still in place. In 1982, it was added to the National Register of Historic Places.

It has been repainted in white and black from the brown with red trim Barr favored. After continuous occupation since Barr's day, in April 2006 it became vacant, and remains so, although work is actively being done on the house as of 2007.
