= Stonihurst =

Historic house in New York, United States

- U.S. National Register of Historic Places
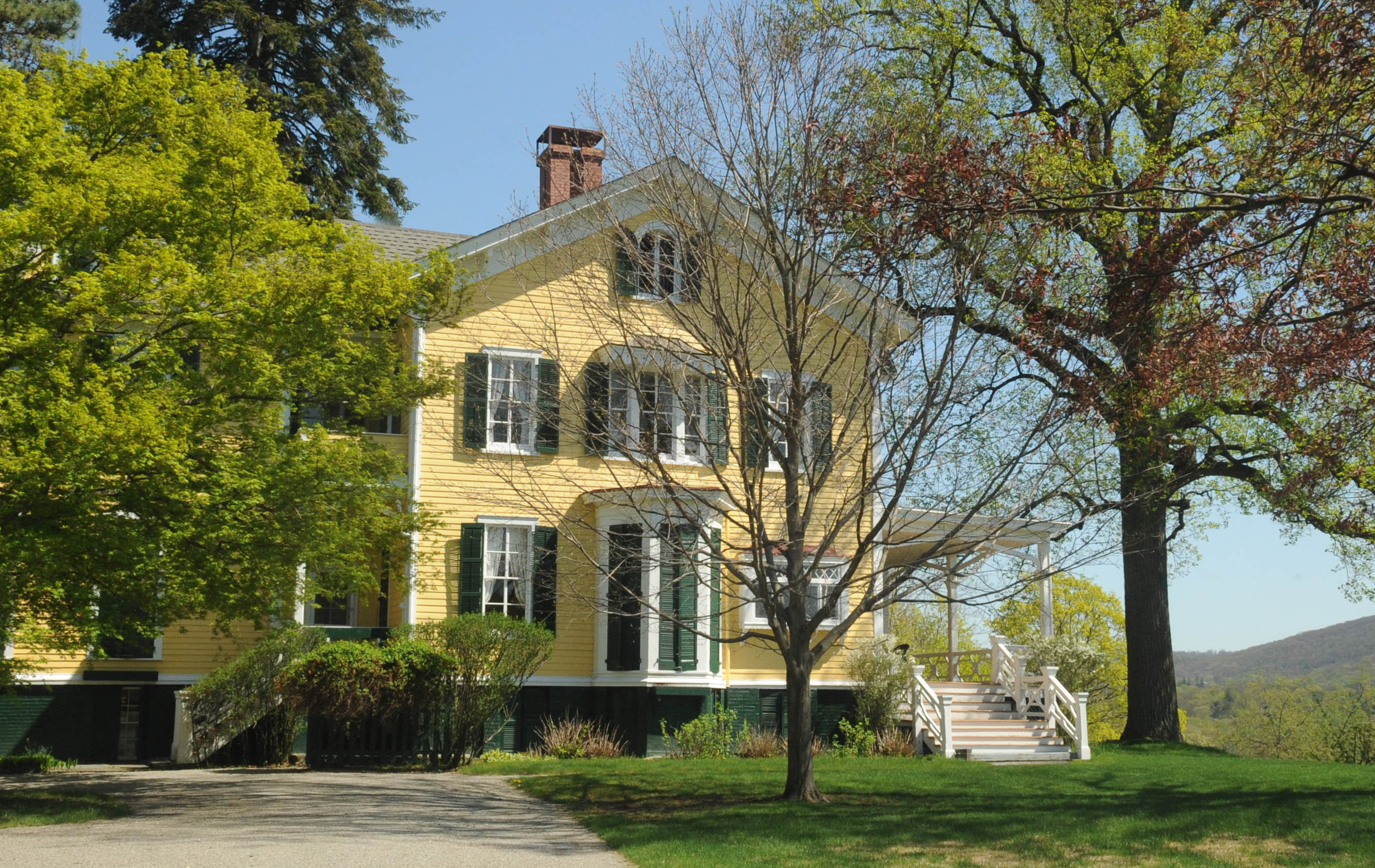

- Location within New York Location within the United States
- Location: NY 218, Highland Falls, New York
- Coordinates: 41°21′24″N 73°58′1″W
- Area: 27.1 acres (11.0 ha)
- Built: 1845
- Architectural style: Gothic
- MPS: Hudson Highlands MRA
- NRHP reference No.: 82001228
- Added to NRHP: November 23, 1982

Stonihurst is a historic estate located at Highland Falls in Orange County, New York. It was built about 1845 and is a two-story clapboard structure on a brick foundation with Gothic style details. Also on the property is a two-story board and batten barn, gatehouse, and gazebo.

It was listed on the National Register of Historic Places in 1982.
