= Normandy Grange =

Historic house in New York, United States

- U.S. National Register of Historic Places
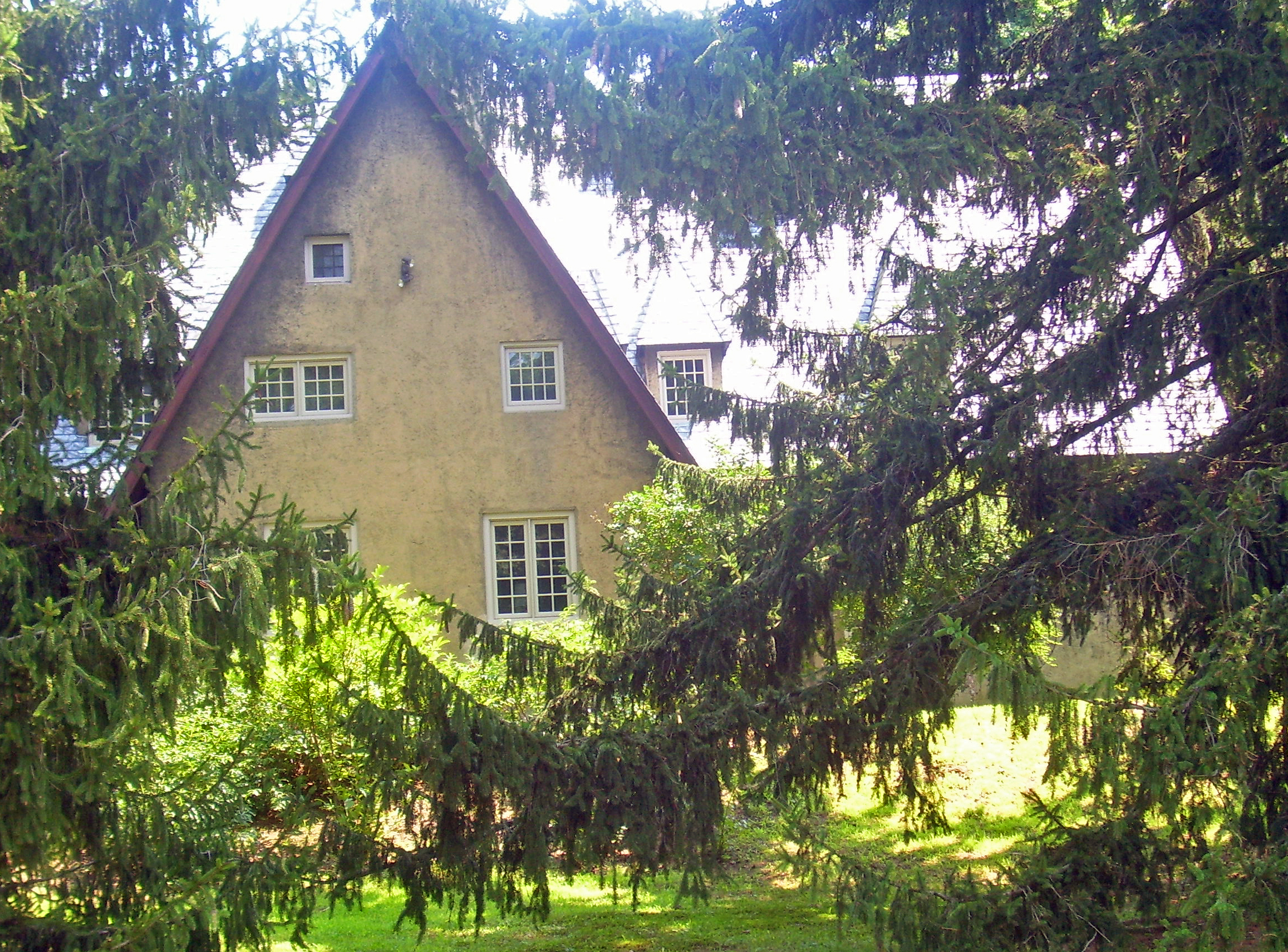
- West (front) elevation of gatehouse, 2008
- Location: Garrison, New York
- Coordinates: 41°23′35″N 73°55′59″W
- Area: 48 acres (19 ha)
- Built: 1905
- Architectural style: Norman
- MPS: Hudson Highlands MRA
- NRHP reference No.: 82001250
- Added to NRHP: November 23, 1982

Normandy Grange is located along NY 9D north of Garrison, New York, United States. It is a Norman-style house and farm complex built in the early 20th century.

It was intended to be the gatehouse for Evans Dick's nearby Dick's Castle estate, which was never completed. He and his family lived there during construction of the castle, and found they liked it. In 1982 it was listed on the National Register of Historic Places as part of the Hudson Highlands Multiple Resource Area.

== Properties ==
The Grange is today on two lots: a four-acre (1.6 ha) parcel with the west-facing gatehouse on Route 9D, and the farm buildings on the back 44 acres (18 ha). Trees screen most of the front of the gatehouse from the highway. A driveway curves around through an open area past some of the farm buildings, and then uphill. There are five contributing properties.

The gatehouse is a three-story stucco-sided building with a steeply pitched jerkin roof and exposed rafters. It has sixteen steep hipped dormer windows and three shed-roofed porches. The chimneys have arched brick covers on top. Garage and greenhouse wings have been added.

Behind it, to the east, is the barn, built into the slope. It is two stories high, with a similarly steep slate gable roof topped with a cupola and randomly placed hipped dormers. Inside are horse stalls and a hayloft on the upper level and a calf barn on the lower. A one-story stucco-sided slate-covered gable-roofed pigeon and dove roost is attached to the southeast.

Further to the east, up the hill, is the combined carriage house and servants' quarters. It is an H-shaped one-and-a-half-story stone building. Its gabled roof has a similar treatment as the gatehouse, with exposed rafters and stucco chimneys with arched caps. Next to it is a small building known as the Turkey House. Dick liked to play card games there, but it is not known if turkeys were ever actually raised in it.

== History ==
Dick had begun acquiring the property, part of the former Gouverneur estate, as early as 1880 with the intent of building an estate there. He named the support structures for the hilltop castle Normandy Grange, after their Norman architectural style, rarely used in the U.S. During construction, he and his family lived in the Grange houses themselves and found they liked them.

Later the properties were split into the two lots found today. Some additions were made, such as the greenhouse and garage on the gatehouse, and one of the carriage bays in that house was closed off. The property left the Dick family but has remained private residences, with minimal alteration since those modifications.

In 1993 the pictured "gatehouse" and contiguous property was purchased by S.T.B. Jablonski, a New York City S.E.C. registered investment advisor; from Mr. and Mrs. Donald Trost, through McCaffrey Realty of Cold Spring, N.Y. In 1994, it was discovered that the residence had been infested for decades with a substantial colonization of bats; which had not been disclosed and intentionally hidden by the sellers and their real estate agents, in order to accomplish sale of the property. In 1996 Jablonski filed suit against the sellers and their agents, for rescission of the purchase. Although terms of the settlement cannot be disclosed, the property was transferred in 2005 to the ownership of the wife of the attorney who represented the real estate agents. Prior to this lawsuit, New York had been a caveat emptor (buyer beware) state with respect to real estate transactions. The lawsuit "Jablonski versus Trost, McCaffrey, Piermarini et al", has resulted in significant changes protecting buyers from fraudulent concealment by sellers and their agents.
