= Glenfield railway station =

Glenfield railway station may refer to:

- Glenfield railway station (Leicestershire), England (closed)
- Glenfield railway station (Scotland), Renfrewshire (closed)
- Glenfield railway station, Sydney, Australia
