= H. D. Champlin & Son Horseshoeing and Wagonmaking =

Historic commercial building in New York, United States

- H. D. Champlin & Son; Horseshoeing and Wagonmaking
- U.S. National Register of Historic Places
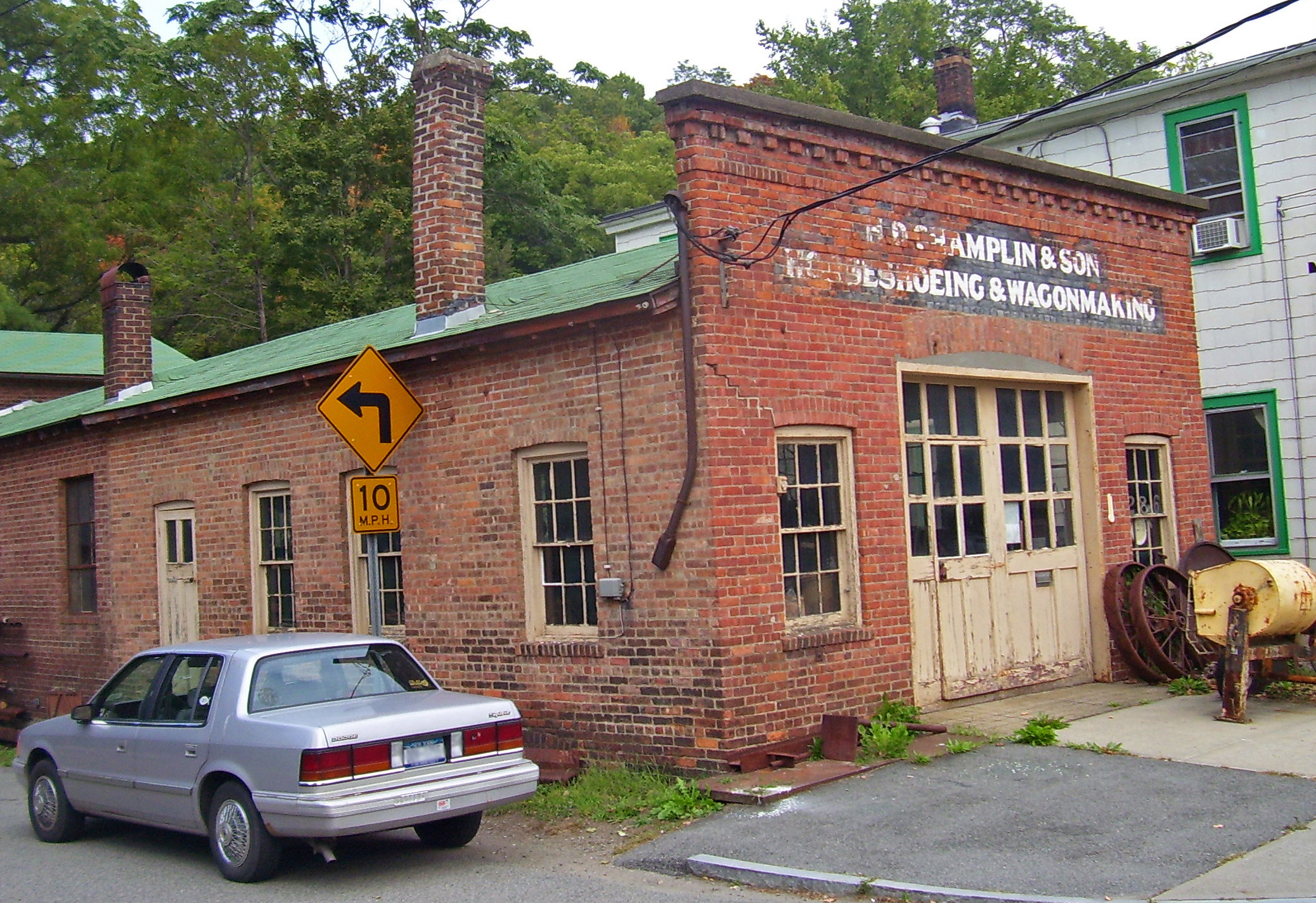
- Store building in 2007
- Location: Nelsonville, NY
- Nearest city: Beacon
- Coordinates: 41°25′28″N 73°56′50″W
- Built: ca. 1876
- MPS: Hudson Highlands Multiple Resource Area
- NRHP reference No.: 82001234
- Added to NRHP: 1982

The H. D. Champlin & Son Horseshoeing and Wagonmaking shop building is located on Main Street (NY 301) in Nelsonville, New York, United States. It is a typical commercial structure for a common business of the late 19th century that survives in good condition. In 1982 it was added to the National Register of Historic Places.

Champlin started his business in 1858 in a building on nearby Spring Street behind the present property. His name does not show up on maps at that site until 1876, and only by 1912 does the current, one-story brick building appear on any map of the village.

The entranceway was expanded and a larger door installed at some point before then. It is used today as a garage.
