= Camp Olmsted (New York) =

- U.S. National Register of Historic Places
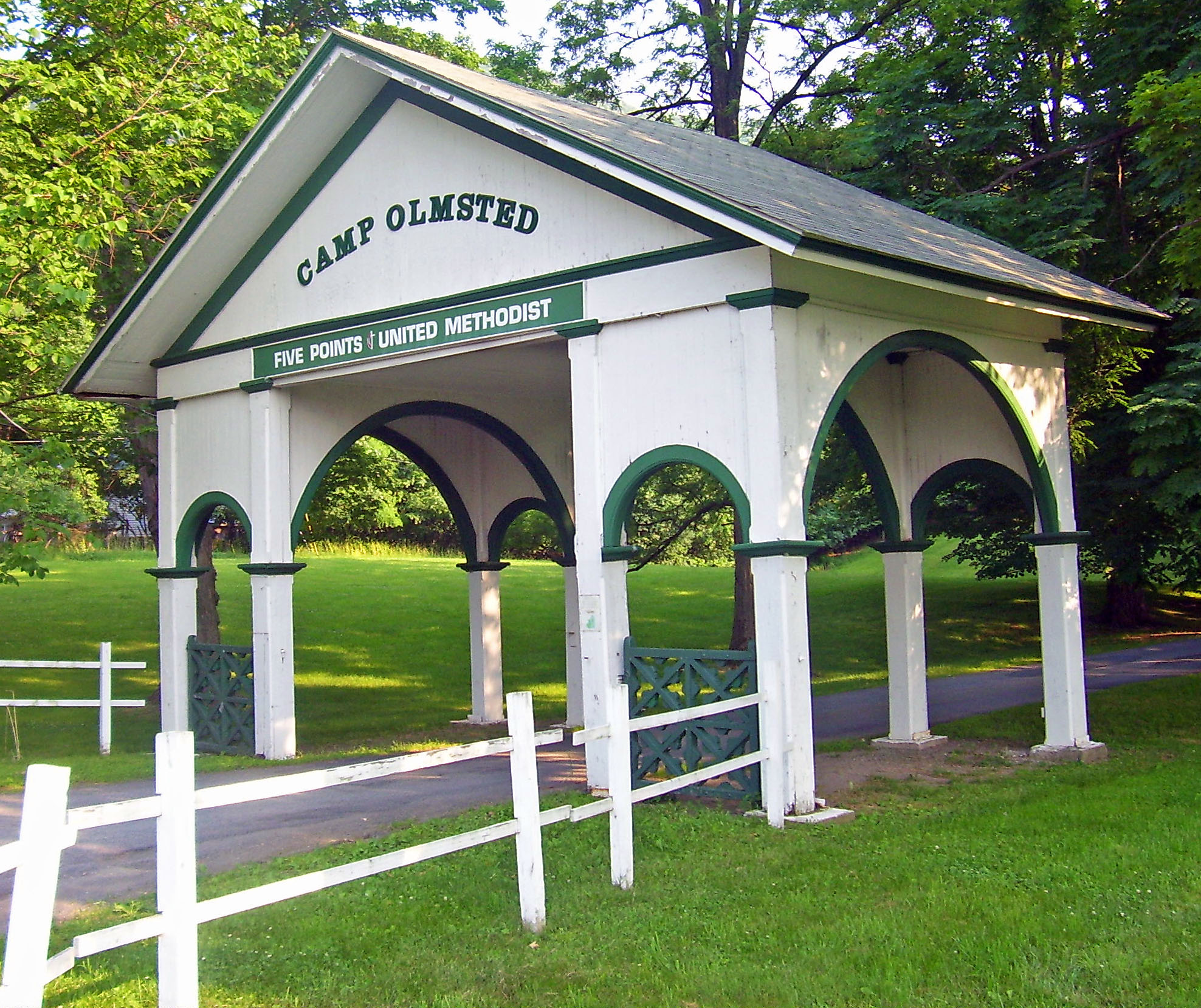
- Front gate of camp
- Location: Cornwall-on-Hudson, NY
- Nearest city: Newburgh
- Coordinates: 41°26′23″N 74°00′14″W
- Area: 76 acres (31 ha)
- Built: 1901
- MPS: Hudson Highlands MRA
- NRHP reference No.: 82001212
- Added to NRHP: November 23, 1982

Camp Olmsted is a summer camp and retreat in Cornwall-on-Hudson, New York, operated by the Five Points Mission, a Methodist organization. It is located along Bayview Avenue, NY 218, near Storm King Mountain.

It was founded in 1901 when the mission, which had been working to improve conditions for residents of the eponymous Manhattan slum (depicted in the Martin Scorsese film Gangs of New York) since 1848. At the turn of the century, they realized children from the immigrant families they were helping needed a place to get away from the city during the summer. Sarah and John Olmsted donated the 21-acre (8 ha) parcel that was originally known as the Olmsted Fresh Air Home. Campers would take the Hudson River Day Liner from the city to Cornwall and then proceed to the camp.

In 1966 the New York City Society took a role in operating the camp, which, when three cabins were winterized, allowed for year-round operation. The camp was added to the National Register of Historic Places in 1982, and accredited by the American Camp Association two years later. The addition of two adjoining properties in 1998 brought the facility to its current 76-acre (30 ha) size. Today the camp runs four 12-day sessions for city children in the summer, and religious retreats year-round.
