= Cragston Dependencies =

Historic houses in New York, United States

- U.S. National Register of Historic Places
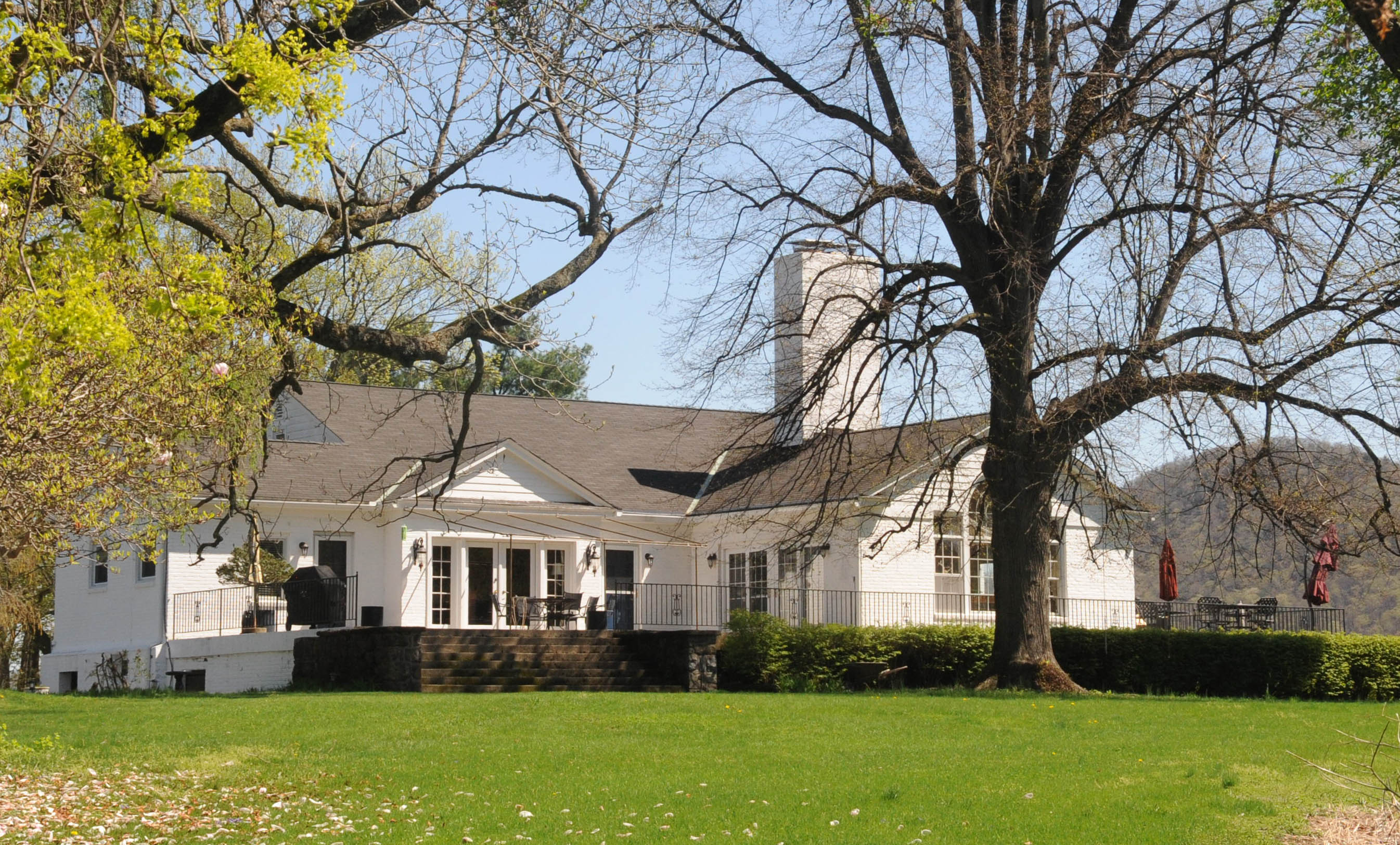

- Location within New York Location within the United States
- Location: NY 218, Highlands, New York
- Coordinates: 41°21′9″N 73°58′14″W
- Area: less than one acre
- Built: 1860
- Architectural style: Gothic Revival
- MPS: Hudson Highlands MRA
- NRHP reference No.: 82001214
- Added to NRHP: November 23, 1982

Cragston Dependencies is a group of historic buildings located at Highlands in Orange County, New York. They were built about 1860 as part of the Cragston estate of J. P. Morgan (1837–1913). They consist of a house, barn, well, carriage house, and stable in the Carpenter Gothic style.

It was listed on the National Register of Historic Places in 1982.
