= Hustis House =

Historic house in New York, United States

- U.S. National Register of Historic Places
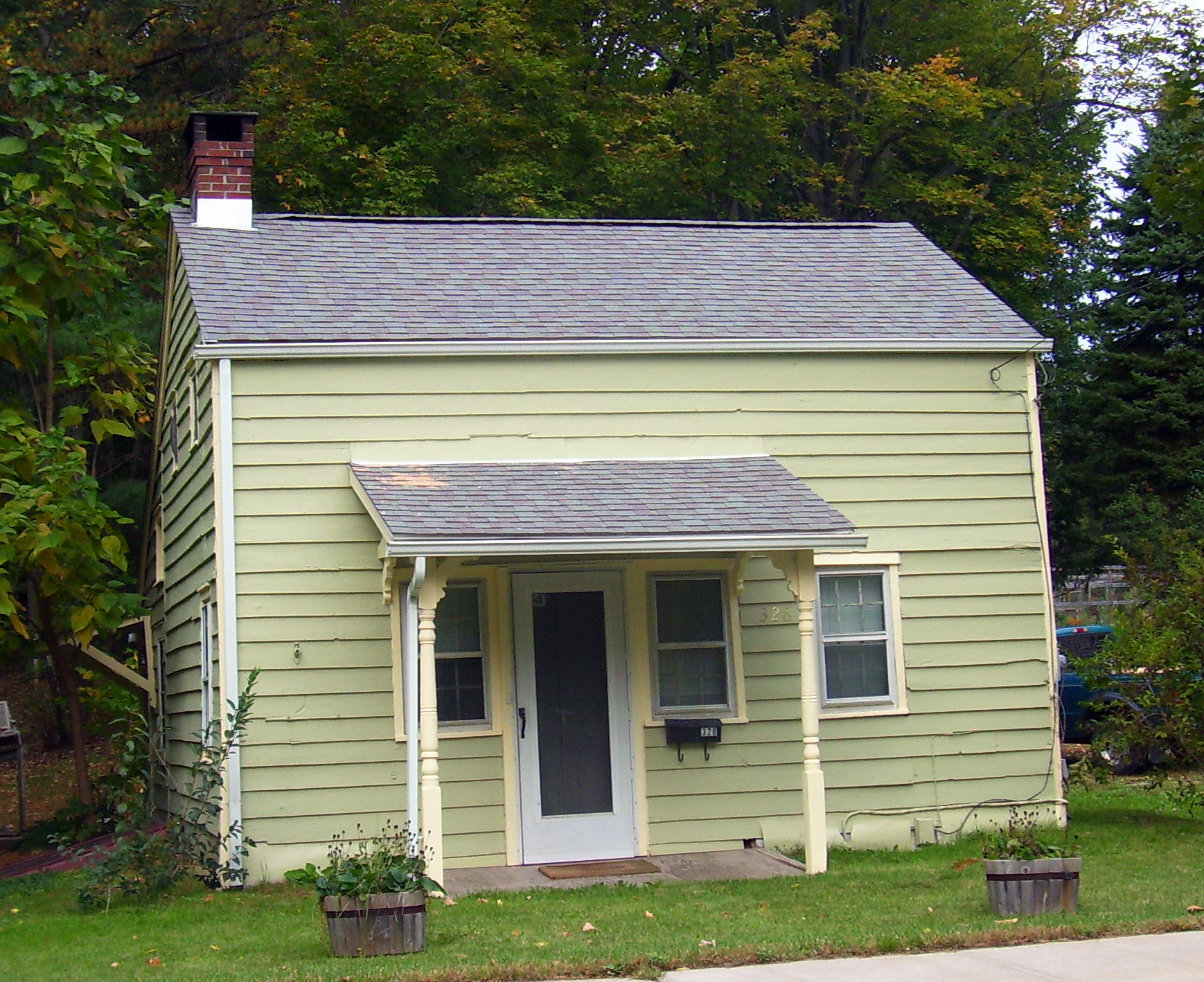
- Front (south) elevation, 2007
- Location: Nelsonville, NY
- Nearest city: Beacon
- Coordinates: 41°25′35″N 73°56′33″W
- Area: 0.3 acres (0.12 ha)
- Built: mid-19th century
- MPS: Hudson Highlands MRA
- NRHP reference No.: 82001248
- Added to NRHP: November 23, 1982

The Hustis House is located on Main Street (NY 301) in Nelsonville, New York, United States. It is a small home built sometime in the middle of the 19th century, likely as housing for workers at the West Point Foundry in nearby Cold Spring. It has remained nearly intact since then, and was listed on the National Register of Historic Places in 1982.

The house is a simple one-and-a-half-story frame clapboard-sided structure with a stone basement, its gabled roof sloping saltbox-style to create an extended rear first floor. Its doors and windows are trimmed with plain wooden sills and lintels. The only decorative touch are the pillars on the covered porch, which was added sometime after the house was built. A cellar door and shed addition on the rear also seem to have come later.

It is unknown exactly when the house was built. It first appears on an 1867 map of the region as the property of an E. Hustis but with an earlier construction date indicated. It is typical of the kind of vernacular homes found in Nelsonville, a community that was home to many workers at the foundry.
