= Moore House (Garrison, New York) =

United States historic place

- U.S. National Register of Historic Places
- Location within New York Location within the United States
- Location: Nelson Ln., Garrison, New York
- Coordinates: 41°22′49″N 73°56′16″W
- Area: 8.3 acres (3.4 ha)
- Built: 1860
- Architect: Moore, George E.
- MPS: Hudson Highlands MRA
- NRHP reference No.: 82001249
- Added to NRHP: November 23, 1982

Moore House is a historic home located at Garrison in Putnam County, New York. It was built about 1860 and is a modest two family, 1 1/2-story frame farm workers residence.

It was listed on the National Register of Historic Places in 1982.
