= River View House =

Historic house in New York, United States

- U.S. National Register of Historic Places
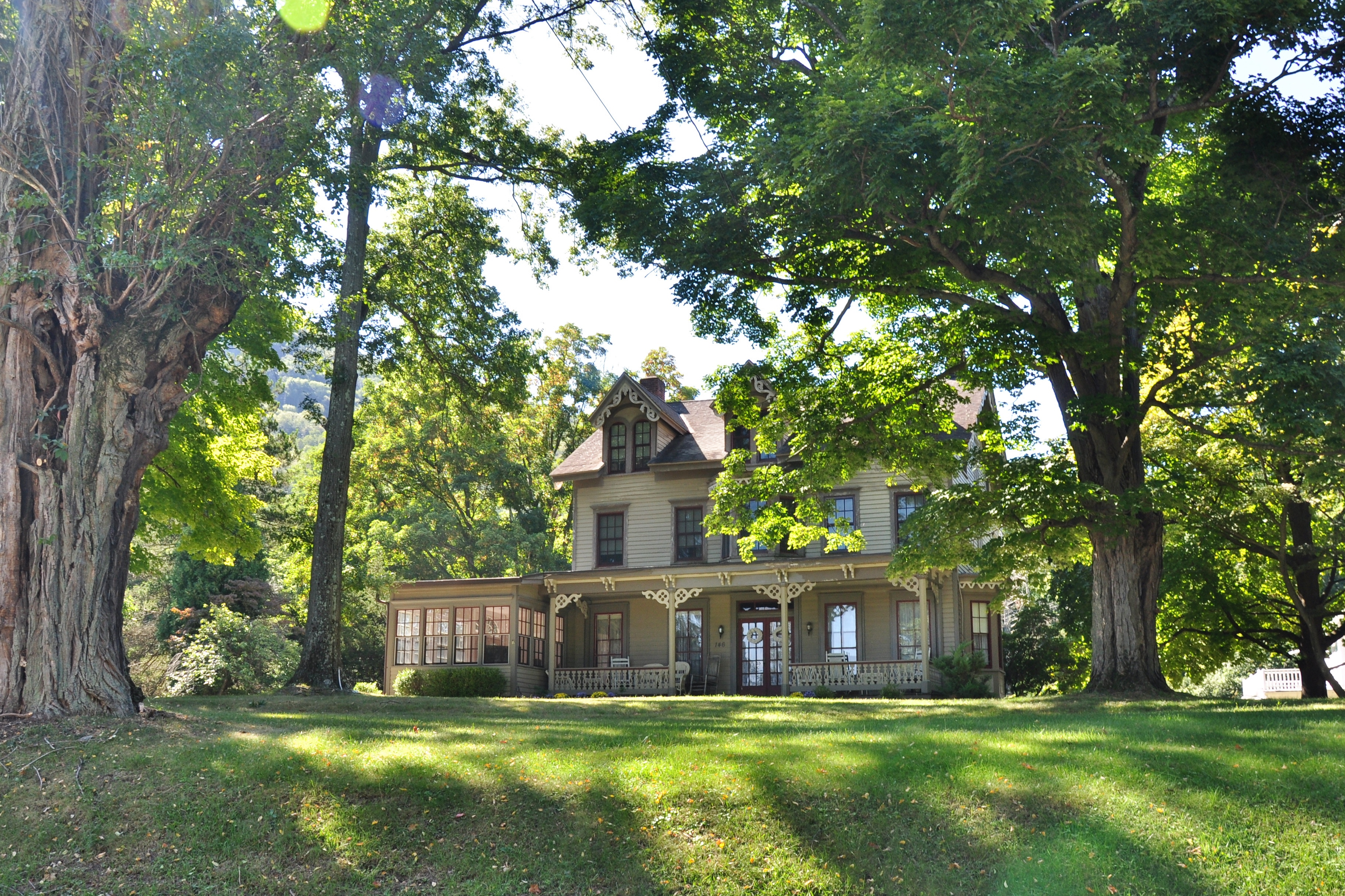

- Location within New York Location within the United States
- Location: 146 Bayview Ave., Cornwall, New York
- Coordinates: 41°26′24″N 74°0′8″W
- Area: 9 acres (3.6 ha)
- Built: 1850
- Architectural style: Italianate, Gothic Revival
- MPS: Hudson Highlands MRA
- NRHP reference No.: 82001225
- Added to NRHP: November 23, 1982

River View House is a historic home located at Cornwall in Orange County, New York. It was built between 1850 and 1860 and is a two-story, five bay frame dwelling. It features a center projecting bay and refined Italianate / Carpenter Gothic style details. Also on the property is a cottage.

It was listed on the National Register of Historic Places in 1982.
