= Glenfields (Philipstown, New York) =

Historic house in New York, United States

- U.S. National Register of Historic Places
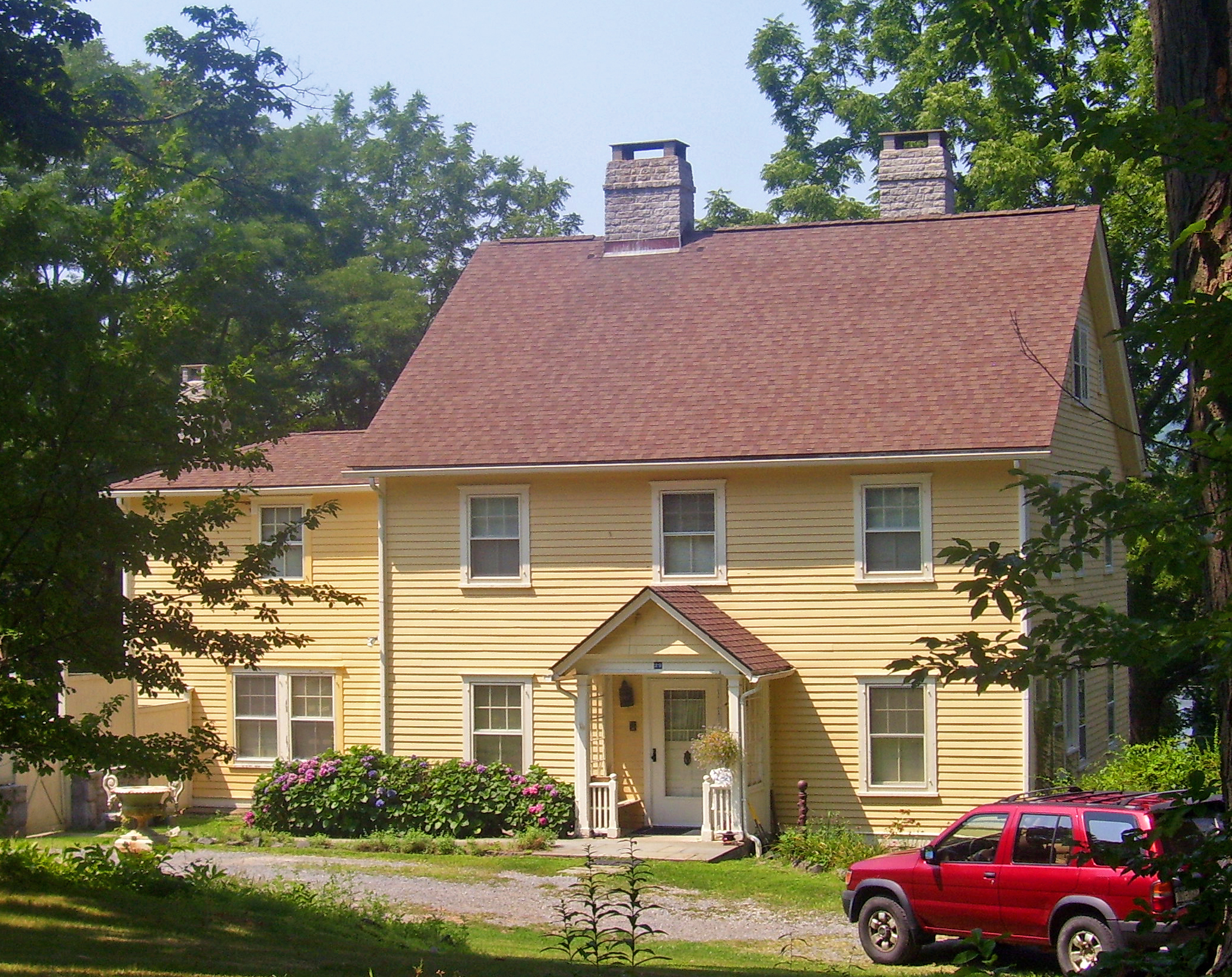
- Front (west) elevation and north profile, 2008

- Location within New York Location within the United States
- Interactive map showing the location of Glenfields
- Location: Philipstown, New York
- Nearest city: Peekskill
- Coordinates: 41°21′03″N 73°57′09″W
- Built: ca. 1870
- Architect: Mead and Taft
- MPS: Hudson Highlands MRA
- NRHP reference No.: 82001245
- Added to NRHP: November 23, 1982

Glenfields, the former Archibald Gracie King House, is located on Old Manitou Road, a short distance from NY 9D, south of Garrison in the town of Philipstown, New York, United States. It is a simple late 19th-century frame house with some unusual windows.

King was a descendant of Rufus King and other early New York power brokers who had married a descendant of the area's pre-Revolutionary landowners. He built the house, from a design by a local architectural firm, as a summer residence overlooking the nearby Hudson River. In 1982 it was listed on the National Register of Historic Places as part of the Hudson Highlands Multiple Resource Area.

== Building ==
Glenfields is a two-story structure with clapboard siding, a partially exposed granite basement and a gabled roof with boxed cornice. Two granite chimneys, slightly offset, rise from the center.

Windows on the east (front) facade are double-hung sash with an unusual 6-over-2 design, framed by molded lintels and plain sills. The central porch is supported by Doric columns, with a pedimented entablature. A double-tiered veranda on the west (rear) side has a shed roof supported by simples posts with a plain railing. The basement on that side has windows with brick surrounds.

A two-story wing projects from the south elevation. It has the same window treatment as the main block, but has a hipped roof.

== History ==
King, son of Congressman James G. King, owned along with his son Frederick Gore King much of the area around the house when he bought the land it stands on in 1868. Most of his holdings were commercial interests, such as the nearby quarry where Russel Wright and his wife built Manitogain the mid-20th century. He also owned a copper mine and apple orchard in the area, and shipped these products to New York City via his private docks on the Hudson River near where the Manitou train station is today.

He contracted the Cornwall firm of Mead and Taft, which would become a major designer of summer residences in the area like Amelia Barr's Cherry Croft, to design a house. It was finished around 1870. The south wing was added 20 years later. There have been no other major alterations to the house since.
