= First Baptist Church of Cold Spring (Nelsonville, New York) =

Historic church in New York, United States

Church On The Hill
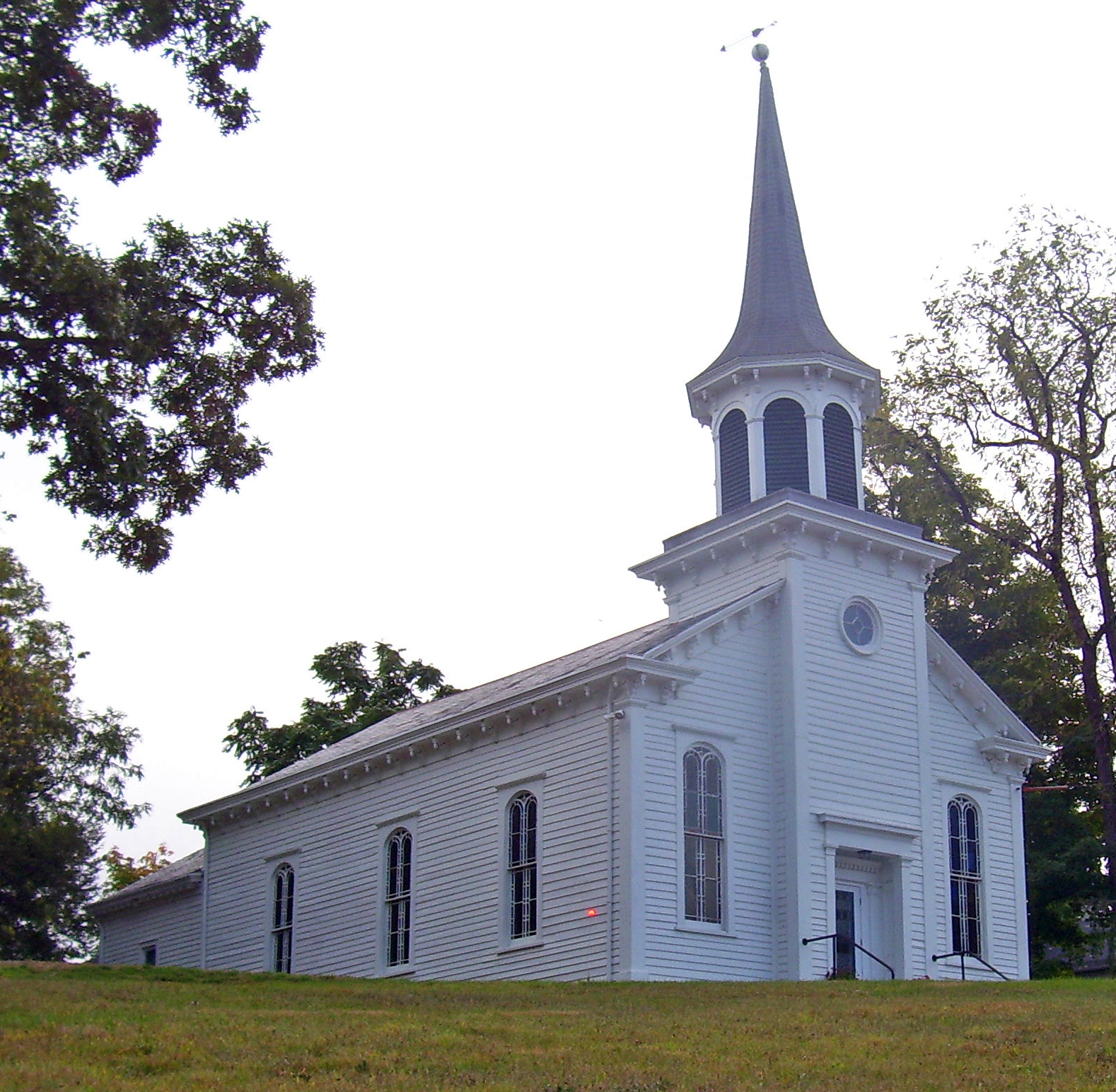
- Front (north) elevation and east profile, 2007

Religion
- Affiliation: Baptist (former) Non denominational Christian (current)
- Year consecrated: 1831
- Status: active

Location
- Location: Nelsonville, NY, United States
- Interactive map of Church On The Hill
- Coordinates: 41°25′22″N 73°56′59″W

Architecture
- Architect: Davenport
- General contractor: William Bowne
- Completed: 1832
- Construction cost: 1825
- Direction of façade: north

The Church on the Hill is located just outside that village on Main Street (NY 301) in Nelsonville, New York, United States. It is the oldest church in the town of Philipstown, which includes both villages, and has been in use continually since its 1831 construction. Its white steeple, at the rise on the line between the villages, is a Nelsonville landmark. The parsonage located on Parsonage Street in Cold Spring is also owned by the church and on the National Historic Registry.

It is also the only frame church of any note within the Hudson Highlands. It was added to the National Register of Historic Places in 1982, and is situated next to Gothic Italianate home at 6 Parsonage Street.

== Building ==
The church is a frame clapboard structure on a stone foundation. The projecting entrance bay frames the doorway with corner pilasters and a plain entablature. The doorway itself is also pilastered, with bracketed capitals and a modillioned cornice.

From this rises a tall pendented steeple, atop an octagonal cupola whose arched openings are filled with louvered panels. The roof is gabled with returns; the projecting eaves are likewise bracketed. All sides have rounded stained-glass windows and corner pilasters.

A later addition, on the rear, has a lower but similar roof and dentilled cornice. Two other additions are of similarly sympathetic styling.

== History ==
The congregation was formed in 1799; it met in members' homes until 1831, when it had grown big enough to afford a church of its own. Samuel and Mary Gouverneur, owners of a large estate that became much of present-day Nelsonville, donated the land in 1831. A man named Davenport (first name unknown) designed the church; William Bowne built it for $825 ($18,406 in 2008 dollars).

It has been added on to several times since and partially rebuilt once. In 1854 the steeple and rear lecture hall were added. A baptistry was carved out of the interior 20 years later. Finally, a 1962 addition to the rear added classrooms, a kitchen and dining room. The interior was damaged by a fire in 1978; it was restored and reopened two years later.

In recent years, the church has left the American Baptists and reorganized as "A non-denominational Christian Community," with the official mantle of "Church on the Hill" in place of "The Cold Spring Baptist Church." The church's pastors are Rev. Tim and Rev. Beth Greco. Pastor Beth Greco is also the CEO of the Hoving Home in Garrison NY, Oxford NJ, Pasadena CA and Las Vegas NV. Pastor Tim also serves as media leassion for the home. The Church is a Bible believing, Jesus loving, sin hating, devil chasing, Holy Spirit filled, water baptizing, congregation.
