= Nelsonville, New York =

- Village
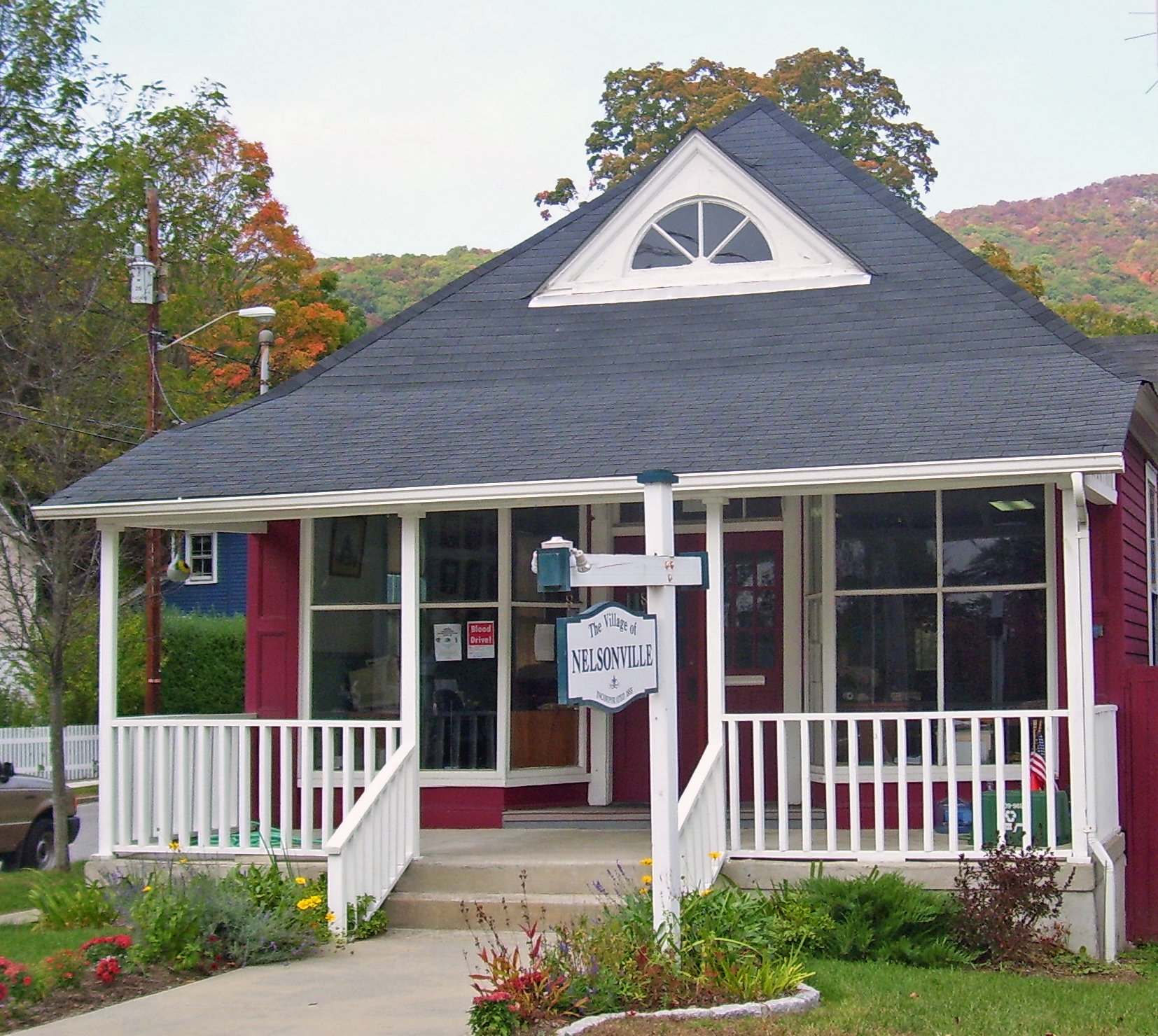
- Village Hall

- Location in Putnam County and the state of New York.
- Coordinates: 41°25′28″N 73°56′39″W
- Country: United States
- State: New York
- County: Putnam

Government
  - Type: Board of Trustees
  - Mayor: Chris Winward

Area
  - Total: 1.03 sq mi (2.68 km^{2})
  - Land: 1.03 sq mi (2.68 km^{2})
  - Water: 0 sq mi (0.00 km^{2})
- Elevation: 187 ft (57 m)

Population (2020)
  - Total: 624
  - Density: 603.6/sq mi (233.04/km^{2})
- Time zone: UTC−5 (Eastern (EST))
  - Summer (DST): UTC−4 (EDT)
- ZIP Code: 10516
- Area code: 845
- FIPS code: 36-49781
- GNIS feature ID: 0970401
- Website: www.nelsonvilleny.gov

Nelsonville is a village located in the town of Philipstown in Putnam County, New York, United States. The population was 624 at the time of the 2020 census.

Nelsonville lies in the Hudson Highlands directly east of the village of Cold Spring. On Main Street, the border is roughly demarcated by the western property line of the Baptist Church at the height of land, and by the property line along the rear of the church lot, extending south toward the Cold Spring Cemetery.

Along with its neighbor, Cold Spring, the village is known for being a small, picturesque enclave with a historic housing stock. It is a popular weekend and fall foliage destination for New York City residents, and the origin of several well-known hiking trails that traverse the Hudson Highlands. The village is served by the Cold Spring Metro-North Railroad stop on the Hudson Line.

== History ==
Nelsonville is named after the Nelson family, early residents in the area. The West Point Foundry Association's operations supported many of the residents of the settlement, directly or indirectly. It was incorporated as a village in 1855. The post office opened in 1888.

== Geography ==
Nelsonville is located at 41°25′28″N 73°56′39″W (41.424550, −73.944170).

According to the United States Census Bureau, the village has a total area of 1.0 square mile (2.6 km^{2}), all land.

Immediately to the north of Nelsonville is Mount Taurus, known to residents of Nelsonville as Bull Hill.

== Demographics ==
Historical population
Census	Pop.	Note	%±
1880	541		—
1900	624		—
1910	765		22.6%
1920	412		−46.1%
1930	470		14.1%
1940	457		−2.8%
1950	522		14.2%
1960	555		6.3%
1970	583		5.0%
1980	567		−2.7%
1990	585		3.2%
2000	565		−3.4%
2010	628		11.2%
2020	624		−0.6%
U.S. Decennial Census

As of the census of 2000, there were 565 people, 222 households, and 154 families residing in the village. The population density was 541.6 inhabitants per square mile (209.1/km^{2}). There were 246 housing units at an average density of 235.8 per square mile (91.0/km^{2}). The racial makeup of the village was 96.28% White, 1.77% African American, 0.35% Asian, 0.71% from other races, and 0.88% from two or more races. Hispanic or Latino of any race were 3.72% of the population.

There were 222 households, out of which 29.7% had children under the age of 18 living with them, 53.6% were married couples living together, 10.4% had a female householder with no husband present, and 30.6% were non-families. 22.5% of all households were made up of individuals, and 6.8% had someone living alone who was 65 years of age or older. The average household size was 2.50 and the average family size was 2.99.

In the village, the population was spread out, with 24.2% under the age of 18, 4.8% from 18 to 24, 31.7% from 25 to 44, 27.4% from 45 to 64, and 11.9% who were 65 years of age or older. The median age was 40 years. For every 100 females, there were 102.5 males. For every 100 females age 18 and over, there were 103.8 males.

The median income for a household in the village was $60,000, and the median income for a family was $67,778. Males had a median income of $42,206 versus $45,625 for females. The per capita income for the village was $24,853. About 3.6% of families and 7.7% of the population were below the poverty line, including 6.1% of those under age 18 and 3.1% of those age 65 or over.

== Education ==
The school district is the Haldane Central School District.
