= Lisa Ellram =

American supply chain scholar

- Born: Lisa Marie Ellram; Minnesota, USA
- Occupations: Scholar, academic, researcher, author, editor
- Years active: 1990-present
- Known for: Her contributions to the analysis of sustainability and supply chain management and cost management
- Title: University Distinguished Professor, James Evans Rees Distinguished Professor of Supply Chain
- Awards: Honorary doctorate degree from Hanken School of Economics (2024), Benjamin Harrison Medallion (2023)

Academic background
- Education: BSB, Accounting, 1982, University of Minnesota; MBA, 1987, University of Minnesota; MA., Logistics, 1989, PhD, Business Administration, 1990, Ohio State University
- Thesis: International supply chain management: strategic implications for the purchasing function (1990)
- Doctoral advisor: Bernard J. La Londe

Academic work
- Discipline: Supply Chain Management
- Sub-discipline: Purchasing, Logistics, Sustainability
- Institutions: Farmer School of Business; Colorado State University; W. P. Carey School of Business
- Main interests: Total Cost of Ownership (TCO), strategic supplier partnerships, purchasing strategy and decision-making, and international and domestic supply chain management and sustainability

Lisa Marie Ellram is an American researcher and professor in supply chain management, specializing in purchasing and logistics with a focus on buyer-supplier relationships, strategic purchasing, and total cost management. Ellram has been a University Distinguished (since 2019) and the James Evans Rees Distinguished Professor of Supply Chain at Miami University's Farmer School of Business (since 2008). She received the Benjamin Harrison Award in 2023.

Ellram's career in academia includes various roles in supply chain and business management. She worked at Arizona State University from 1990 to 2008. In 2001, she was recognized as a Dean's Council of 100 Distinguished Scholar and subsequently appointed as the John and Barbara Bebbling Professor of Business at Arizona State University (ASU). During her tenure at ASU, she was named a "Practitioner Pro to Know" by Supply & Demand Chain Executive for her expertise in supply chain. She left ASU in 2006 to take a position at Colorado State University where she also chaired the Department of Management from 2006 to 2008, and soon after joined Miami University's Farmer School of Business as the James Evans Rees Distinguished Professor of Supply Chain in 2008. As co-editor of the Journal of Supply Chain Management, she contributed to its inclusion in the Thomson Reuters ISI Web of Knowledge. In 2018, she was honored as the first University Distinguished Professor at the Farmer School of Business. And then she served as the Fulbright Distinguished Professor at Hanken School of Economics (2022-2023).

In 2024, the Hanken School of Economics awarded her an honorary doctorate in recognition of her "extensive scientific contributions to the analysis of sustainability and supply chain management".

Her work explores the strategic role of purchasing within supply chain management, advocating for a comprehensive approach to cost analysis through the Total Cost of Ownership (TCO) framework. Ellram's recent work, including a 2019 analysis, includes systematic literature reviews that focus on trends in buyer-supplier relationships and under-explored areas like sustainability and innovation within industrial distribution.

== Early life and education ==
Ellram was born in Minnesota, where grew up, and earned her BSB degree in accounting and MBA from the University of Minnesota and as an accountant for the Pillsbury Company as an accountant. She then traveled to Ohio to earn her Master's degree (logistics) and PhD (management) from Ohio State University. While earning her doctorate, under the supervision of Bernard J. La Londe, she worked as a Graduate Teaching Associate (1988-1990).

== Career ==
Upon earning her PhD, Ellram joined the faculty department of purchasing, logistics and operations at Arizona State University's (ASU) W. P. Carey School of Business. She served as an Assistant Professor of Purchasing and Logistics Management (1990-1996), then as Associate Professor of Supply Chain Management (1996-2000), and a Full Professor of Supply Chain Management (2000-2001). In 2001, she served as Dean's Council of 100 Distinguished Scholar for one year. In 2002, Ellram was named the John and Barbara Bebbling Professor of Business at the W.P. Carey School of Business. During her tenure at ASU, Ellram was recognized as one of 30 "Practitioner Pros to Know" in a list published by Supply & Demand Chain Executive for having "a deep breadth of knowledge about the industry and are forward-thinking in their approach to the evolving supply chain network." From 2006 to 2008, she chaired the Department of Management and Allen Professor of Business at ASU's College of Business.

Ellram's stay in Colorado was short as she quickly accepted a James Evans Rees Distinguished Professor of Supply Chain position at the Farmer School of Business in 2008. She became a co-editor of the Journal of Supply Chain Management, during which it was added to the Thomson Reuters ISI Web of Knowledge. By 2018, Ellram became first Farmer School faculty member to be honored by the University as a Distinguished Scholar and the first to be named a University Distinguished Professor.

In 2024, Ellram was awarded an honorary doctorate from the Hanken School of Economics for her "extensive scientific contributions to the analysis of sustainability and supply chain management".

=== Research ===
==== Supplier Selection in Strategic Partnerships ====
In her 1990 paper, "The Supplier Selection Decision in Strategic Partnerships," Ellram explored the nuanced criteria necessary for choosing suppliers in long-term, partnership-based relationships. Ellram argued that traditional supplier selection criteria, such as cost and quality, are insufficient for strategic partnerships, which require an emphasis on "soft" factors. Through case studies, she identified four critical categories: financial health, organizational culture and strategic alignment, technological capability, and other considerations like safety and reputation. Her work stressed that successful partnerships depend on factors beyond performance metrics, such as mutual trust and compatibility across organizational levels.

==== Total Cost of Ownership (TCO) ====
In a notable 1995 article, Ellram analyzed Total Cost of Ownership (TCO) as a method for evaluating supplier costs beyond initial purchase prices. Using case studies across various industries, she identified key TCO components, including acquisition, possession, usage, and disposal costs. Her research compared TCO to traditional supplier evaluation methods, showing that TCO accounted for often-overlooked factors like supplier performance and quality.

==== Supply Chain Finance ====
Ellram emphasizes a holistic approach to supply chain finance. She advocates for strategic management of payment terms and supplier relationships to enhance both resilience and competitiveness. In her co-edited book, Supply Chain Finance: Risk Management, Resilience and Supplier Management (2018), she cautions against narrow financial practices like delayed supplier payments, which can destabilize suppliers and compromise long-term supply reliability. Ellram stresses that understanding the full cost of capital and valuing the supply base are essential to building sustainable supply chains that support both financial and operational health.

==== Sustainability in Supply Chain Management ====
Ellram's research spans numerous areas of supply chain sustainability, including purchasing, freight transportation, reverse logistics, last-mile transportation to customers, and circular economy. In her 2010 review of corporate social responsibility reports, she found that institutional pressure plays a strong role in determining which aspects of sustainability companies emphasize in their industries. In her 2022 study of sustainable freight transportation, she found that a lack of external and top-down institutional pressure can limit the continuity of corporate freight transportation sustainability efforts.

== Selected publications ==
=== Books/monographs ===
- Ellram, L. M. (1994). Total cost modeling in purchasing. Center for Advanced Purchasing Studies.
- Ellram, L. M. (1997). Outsourcing: Implications for supply management. Center for Advanced Purchasing Studies.
- Lambert, D., Stock, J. R., & Ellram, L. M. (1998). Fundamentals of logistics management. McGraw-Hill.
- Ellram, L. M. (1999). The role of supply management in target costing. Center for Advanced Purchasing Studies.
- Ellram, L. (2013). Sourcing to support the green initiative. Business Expert Press.
- Ellram, L.M., Fawcett, S.E., Goldsby, T.J., Hofer C. & Rogers, D. (2024), Logistics Management: Enhancing Competitiveness and Customer Value. MyEducator.com
- Ellram, L.M., Fawcett, S.E., Mena, C., Tate, W.L., Davis-Sramek, E., & Castillo, V. (2024) . Sustainability and Risk across the Supply Chain. Myeducator.com

=== Edited books ===
- Ellram, L. M., & Birou, L. M. (1995). Purchasing for bottom line impact: improving the organization through strategic procurement.
- Ellram, L. M., & Choi, T. Y. (2000). Supply management for value enhancement. Institute for Supply Management.
- Tate, W., Bals, L., & Ellram, L. (Eds.). (2018). Supply chain finance: Risk management, resilience and supplier management. Kogan Page Publishers, Chinese edition published in 2023.
- Bals, L., Tate, W., and Ellram, L.M. (2022). Circular Economy Supply Chains – From Chains to Systems. Emerald Publishers.
- Tate, W., Ellram, L.M. and Bals, L. (2022). "Handbook of Theories for Purchasing and Supply Management Research : Research Handbooks in Business and Management," Edward Elgar ; recipient of the Les Plumes des Achats award for the best purchasing book of 2022.

=== Articles ===
- Ellram, L. M. (1990). The supplier selection decision in strategic partnerships. Journal of Purchasing and materials Management, 26(4), 8-14. doi:10.1111/j.1745-493X.1990.tb00515.x
- Ellram, Lisa M., and Amelia Carr. "Strategic purchasing: a history and review of the literature." International journal of purchasing and materials management 30, no. 1 (1994): 9-19. doi:10.1111/j.1745-493X.1994.tb00185.x
- Ellram, L. M. (1995). Total cost of ownership: an analysis approach for purchasing. International Journal of Physical Distribution & Logistics Management, 25(8), 4-23. doi:10.1108/09600039510099928
- Ellram, L. M., Tate, W. L., & Billington, C. (2004). Understanding and managing the services supply chain. Journal of supply chain management, 40(3), 17-32. doi:10.1111/j.1745-493X.2004.tb00176.x
- Tate, W.L., Ellram, L.M. And Kirchoff, J.F. (2010), Corporate Social Responsibility Reports: A Thematic Analysis Related to Supply Chain Management. Journal of Supply Chain Management, 46: 19-44. doi:10.1111/j.1745-493X.2009.03184.x
- Ellram, Lisa M., Wendy L. Tate, and Kenneth J. Petersen. "Offshoring and reshoring: an update on the manufacturing location decision." Journal of Supply Chain Management 49, no. 2 (2013): 14-22. doi:10.1111/jscm.12019
- Ellram, Lisa M., and Monique L. Ueltschy Murfield. "Supply chain management in industrial marketing–Relationships matter." Industrial Marketing Management 79 (2019): 36-45. doi:10.1016/j.indmarman.2019.03.007
- Ellram, L. M. (1991). A managerial guideline for the development and implementation of purchasing partnerships. International journal of purchasing and materials management, 27(3), 2-8. doi:10.1111/j.1745-493X.1991.tb00534.x
- Ellram, L.M., Tate, W.L. and Saunders, L.W. (2022), "A legitimacy theory perspective on Scope 3 freight transportation emissions," Journal of Business Logistics, Vol. 43 (2), 472-498. doi:10.1111/jbl.12299

== Honors and awards ==
- Honorary doctorate degree from Hanken School of Economics for her "extensive scientific contributions to the analysis of sustainability and supply chain management" (2024)
- Named WISE Legend, Supply Chain Educators category (2024), for being one of the first scholars to apply theory in supply chain management, honored by Women Impacting Supply Chain Excellence (WISE)
- Benjamin Harrison Award, Miami University (2023) (Note: It is awarded annually for extraordinary and sustained contributions related to teaching, research, and service over the course of their career at the university.)
- Named Council of Supply Chain Management Professionals (CSCMP) Distinguished Fellow in the 2023 Inaugural Class of Distinguished Fellows
- Named in the top 1% of cited scholars globally by Ioannidis JPA, Boyack KW, Baas J (2020)
- Was named one of the "100 Most Influential Women in Supply Chain 2020" by B2G Consulting
- Named as one of the top 50 (number 9) most influential/impactful Supply Chain Management Scholars in top SCM journals Babbar, S., Koufteros, X., Behara, R. and Wong, C. (2019) (Note: Only woman ranked in the top 25.)
- Named Miami University Distinguished Professor (2019) (Note: Title awarded to no more than two professors every two years, granted on the basis of "demonstrated teaching excellence and a contributor to the life and mission of Miami University; distinguished scholar of national and international stature with demonstrated recognition and with projected high-level of scholarly productivity in the future.")
