= Edward Payson Roe Memorial Park =

Park in Cornwall-on-Hudson, New York

- Interactive map of Edward Payson Roe Memorial Park
- Type: Memorial park
- Location: Cornwall on Hudson, Orange County, New York, United States of America
- Coordinates: 41°26′11″N 74°00′56″W
- Created: 1894

The Edward Payson Roe Memorial Park is a public park and hiking trail dedicated to American novelist Edward Payson Roe, located in Cornwall-on-Hudson, New York. It borders on land of the Hudson Highlands Nature Museum's Wildlife Education Center. The park features a memorial tablet dedicated to Roe's legacy in 1894.

== Founding ==
Edward Payson Roe spent the final years of his life at his estate, Roelands, in the shadow of Storm King Mountain. His property was situated on a hill overlooking the Hudson Highlands, which he had written about countless times. Roelands was surrounded by gardens kept by Roe and backed by expansive woods. On July 19, 1888, he began to complain of heart pain, a symptom of neuralgia. He had become aware of the condition in himself after an episode in Charleston, South Carolina, on vacation there. After dinner, he read to his daughter and her friend aloud from a book of Nathaniel Hawthorne. After his wife Anna Paulina had made him a remedy for his pains, which did not go away, a physician was called to the house. Roe suffered a sudden heart attack after feeling extreme pain for hours. He was merely 50 years old, and his death was a shock to his family and fans, who were mainly Presbyterians of the American middle class.

At the time of his death, his publishers estimated that over 1,400,000 copies of his novels had been sold in the United States and abroad.

== Memorial Ceremony ==
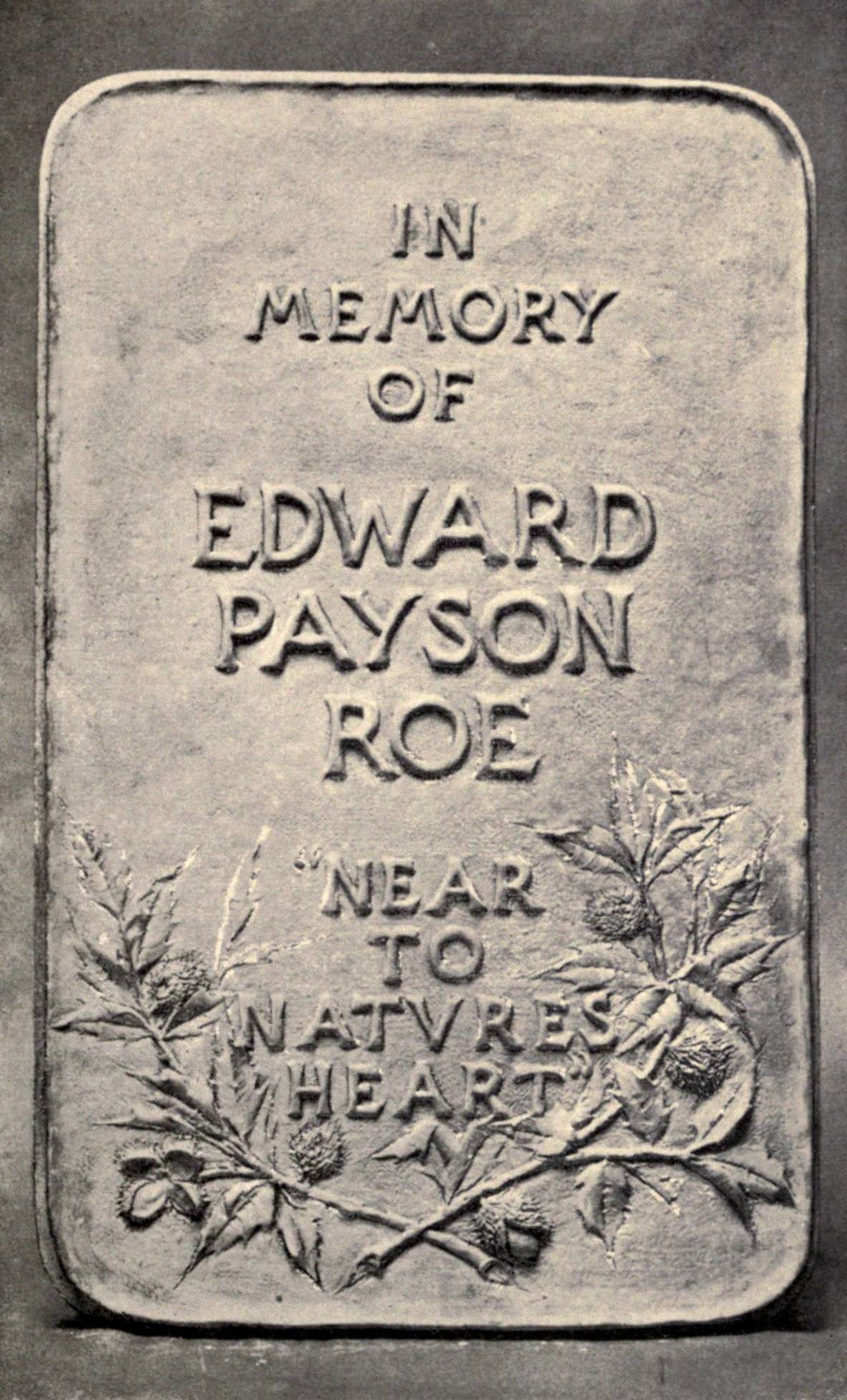
The commemorative tablet to E. P. Roe is mounted on a boulder in the park

On Memorial Day 1894, May 30th that year, a crowd of Edward's family, friends and fans gathered beneath a boulder in the woods behind his estate. At this particular boulder he was known to rest after strenuous hikes with his friends in the surrounding woods. A bronze memorial tablet was fixed to its side to be visible from below.

In attendance were the Rev. Dr. Teal of Elizabeth, New Jersey, a good friend of Roe who had begun his career as a Presbyterian minister in Cornwall, and William Hamilton Gibson, an illustrator and naturalist. Dr. Lyman Abbott spoke at the ceremony. He had assisted Roe in his earliest drafts of his most famous work, Barriers Burned Away, in 1872. The beginning of Abbott's speech tells of Roe's skills as a writer:

"It is of the latter aspect of his life I wish to speak for a few moments only, in an endeavor to interpret his service to the great American people by his pen through literature. The chief function of the imagination is to enable us to realize actual scenes with which we are not familiar. This is an important service. It is well that you who live in these quiet and peaceful scenes should know what is the wretchedness of some of your fellow beings in the slums of New York. It is well that your sympathies should be broadened and deepened, and that you should know the sorrow, the struggle that goes on in those less favored homes. But this is not the only function of the imagination, nor its highest nor most important function. It gives us enjoyment by taking us on its wings and flying with us away from lives which otherwise would be prosaic, dull, commonplace, lives of dull routine and drudgery. But this also is not the only nor the highest use; God has given us imagination in order that we may have noble ideals set before us, and yet ideals so linked to actual life that they shall become inseparable. He has given us imagination that we may see what we may hope for, what we may endeavor to achieve that we may be imbued with a nobler inspiration, a higher hope, and a more loving, enduring patience and perseverance. Realism, which uses imagination only to depict the actual, is not the highest form of fiction. Romanticism, which uses the imagination only to depict what is for us the unreal and impossible, is not the highest form of fiction. That fiction is the highest which by the imagination makes real to our thought the common affairs of life, and yet so blends them with noble ideals that we are able to go back into life with a larger, a nobler, and a more perfect faith."

== Description ==
The property of Roelands has been subdivided into a neighborhood. One street leading up to the park, Payson Road, was named for Roe. The park is situated on Boulevard, a somewhat preserved name for the road that traversed along the side of the original property. A sign marks the pathway up to the boulder. The park is about two acres in size
