= Avercast =

- Company type: Supply chain management software
- Founded: 2008
- Founder: Gene Averill
- Headquarters: Rigby, Idaho; United States
- Area served: Americas, Africa, Asia-Pacific
- Key people: Gene Averill, Founder, President, and CEO Clark Johnson, COO Jason Averill, Executive Vice President
- Products: Supply Chain Management software designed to improve demand forecasting, inventory management and replenishment, supply chain collaboration, and rough cut capacity planning
- Number of employees: 30
- Website: www.avercast.com

Avercast, LLC is in the supply chain management industry of inventory forecasting and supply planning software also known as demand management.

== Company Overview ==
Avercast is an international software company headquartered in Rigby, Idaho, USA. Established in 2008 by Demand Solutions co-founder Gene Averill, Avercast has expanded to include twenty regional offices in 10 countries on five continents.

In 2010, Avercast was included in Supply & Demand Chain Executive magazine's list of the 100 most influential movers and shakers.

In 2011, Avercast founder and chief executive Gene Averill was named a "Provider Pro to Know" by Supply & Demand Chain Executive magazine. Gene Averill pioneered many of the demand management planning technologies that are commonplace in the industry today.

In 2011, Avercast was recognized by Supply & Demand Chain Executive magazine's list of 100 Great Supply Chain Projects for its work with Markwins International.

In 2011, Avercast launched one of the first cloud based demand management platforms aimed toward small to mid-size companies. The company's cloud offerings allow users to purchase a la carte demand management software tools without the need to purchase or upgrade any hardware.
