= Cornwall-on-Hudson, New York =

Cornwall-on-Hudson
- Village
- Village of Cornwall-on-Hudson
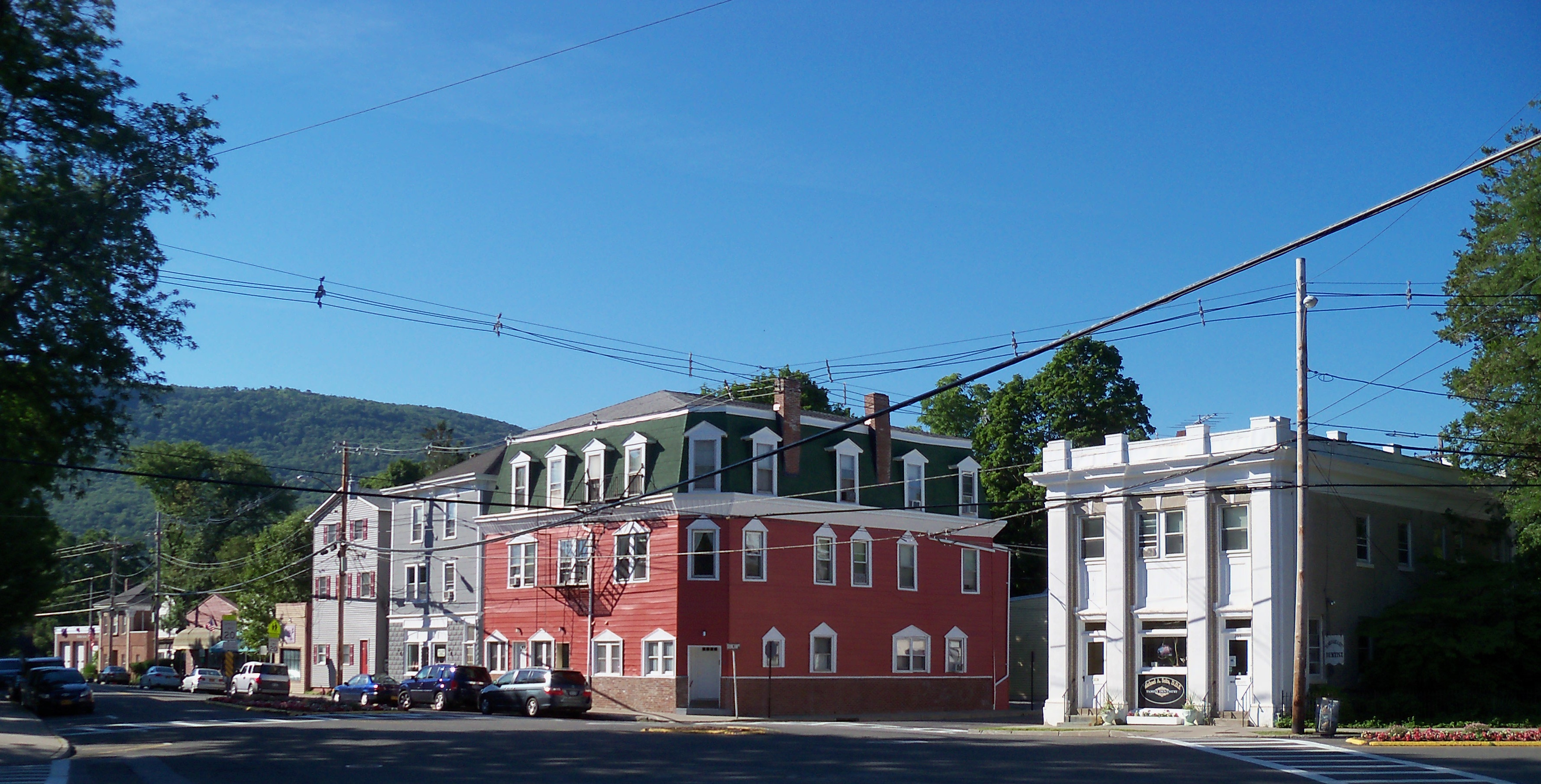
- Downtown Cornwall-on-Hudson

- Location in Orange County and the state of New York.

- Location within New York
- Coordinates: 41.442589°N 74.013898°W
- Country: United States
- State: New York
- County: Orange County
- Town: Cornwall
- Established: 1609
- Incorporated (village): 1884

Area
  - Total: 2.09 sq mi (5.42 km^{2})
  - Land: 1.99 sq mi (5.15 km^{2})
  - Water: 0.10 sq mi (0.27 km^{2})

Population (2020)
  - Total: 3,075
  - Density: 1,547.6/sq mi (597.55/km^{2})
- Time zone: UTC-5 (Eastern (EST))
  - Summer (DST): UTC-4 (EDT)
- ZIP code: 12520
- Area code: 845
- FIPS code: 36-18333
- Website: cornwall-on-hudson.gov

Cornwall-on-Hudson is a riverfront village in the town of Cornwall, Orange County, New York, United States. It lies on the west bank of the Hudson River, approximately 50 miles (80 km) north of New York City. The population as of the 2020 census was 3,075. It is part of the Kiryas Joel–Poughkeepsie–Newburgh metropolitan area as well as the larger New York metropolitan area.

== History ==
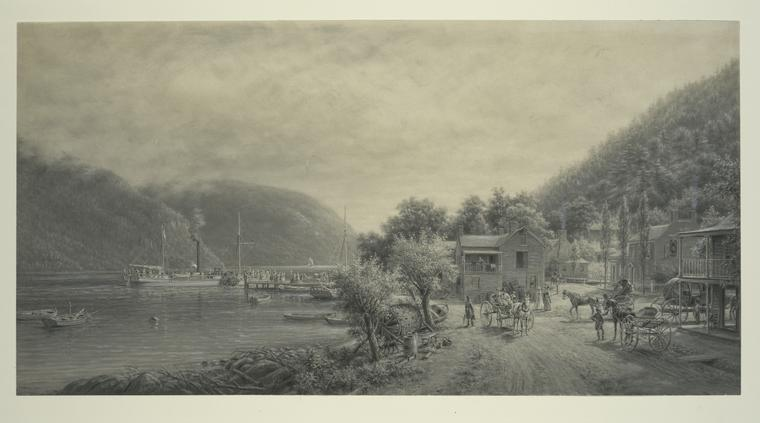
The Clermont making a landing at Cornwall on the Hudson 1810

The village was part of the Governor Dongan tract of 1685. Willisville was an early name for Cornwall-on-Hudson. Settlement in the area occurred at Cornwall Landing, a hamlet on the Hudson River below Butter Hill. It was the only river landing in the town. In the early 1800s, Daniel Tobias sailed a sloop from Cornwall Landing. As there was no direct communication between the river and the table-land above, in 1807, his brother, Isaac S. Tobias, built a road, at his own expense, as far as the first bridge on the road to Willisville. The Mead and Taft Company lumberyard once employed 500 people at the Landing. Cornwall Landing became a commercial hub with its own post office. The Landing began to decline after World War II when passenger train service ended, and Conrail demolished the buildings. Cornwall-on-Hudson incorporated as a village in December 1884, within the Town of Cornwall.

=== Historic places ===
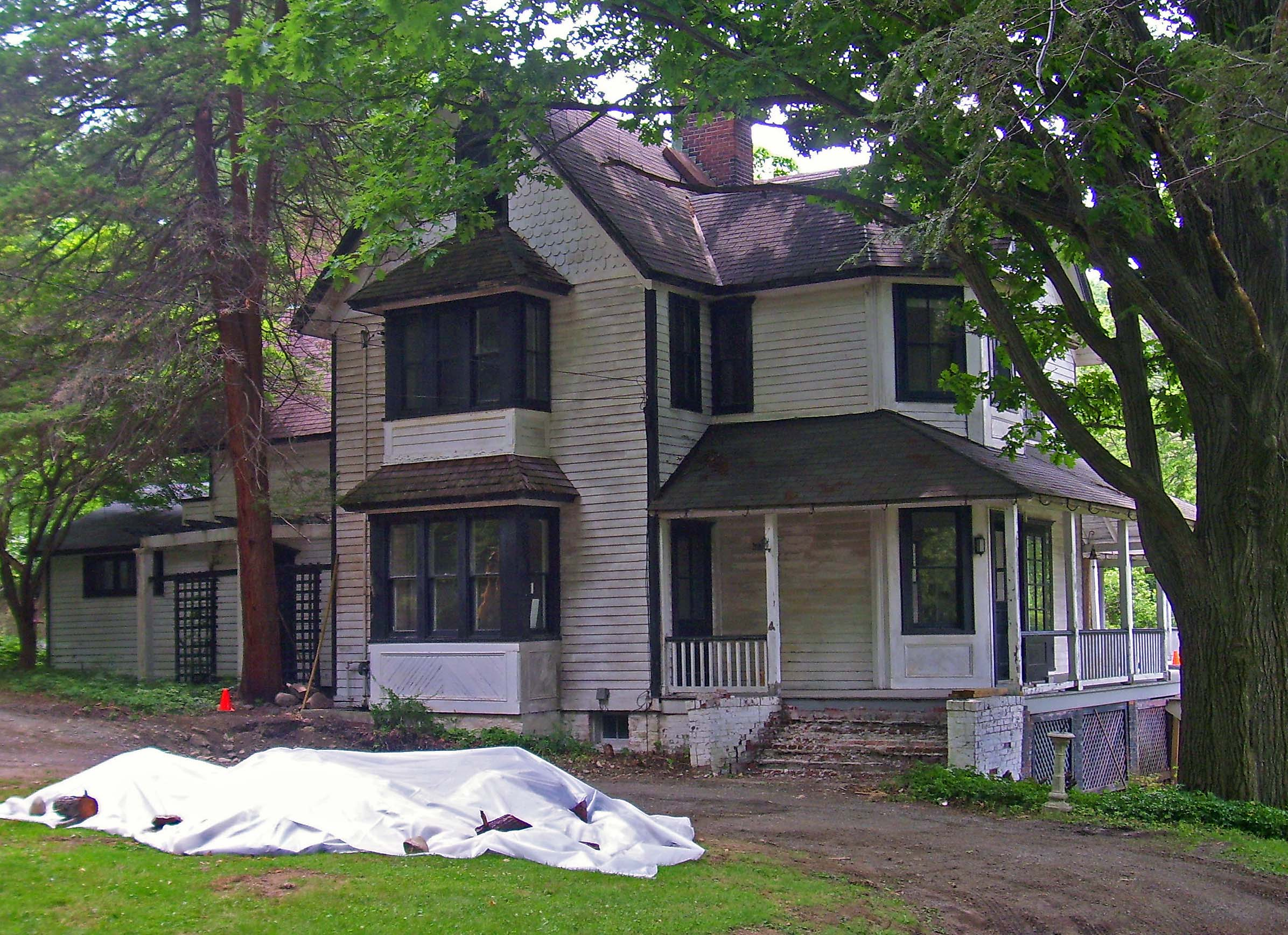
Amelia Barr House

The Amelia Barr House, also known as "Cherry Croft", is located on Mountain Road in Cornwall-on-Hudson, on the slopes of Storm King Mountain. Barr, an American writer born in the 19th century, lived here during the most prolific and successful period of her career. In 1982 it was added to the National Register of Historic Places.

Camp Olmsted is a summer camping facility in Cornwall-on-Hudson, New York, operated by the Five Points Mission, a Methodist organization. It is located along Bayview Avenue, NY-218, near Storm King Mountain. It was founded in 1901. Siblings Sarah and John Olmsted donated the 21-acre (8 ha) parcel. Campers would take the Hudson River Day Line ferry from the city to Cornwall and then proceed to the camp. In 1966 the New York City Society took a role in operating the camp. The camp was added to the National Register of Historic Places in 1982.

== Geography ==
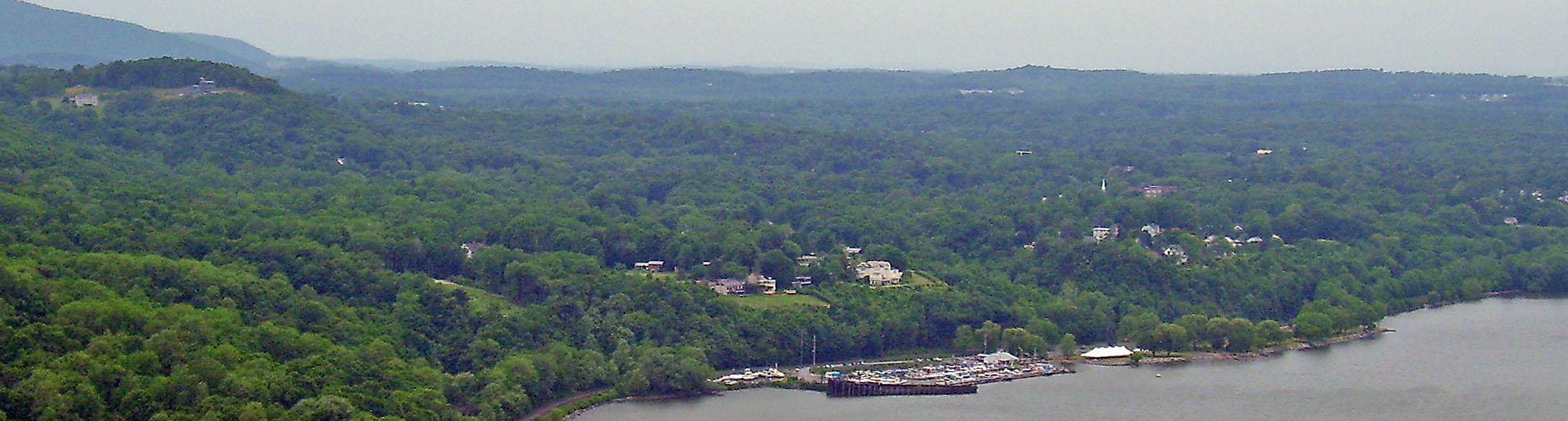
Cornwall-on-Hudson seen from Breakneck Ridge, across the river

According to the United States Census Bureau, the village has a total area of 2.1 square miles (5.4 km^{2}), of which 2.0 square miles (5.2 km^{2}) is land and 0.1 square miles (0.26 km^{2}) (5.31%) is water. The zip code is 12520. Located just 50 miles (80 km) north of New York City, the village borders the western shore of the Hudson River. It is one of the most affluent communities in the Orange County area. While the village is primarily residential, it has a small commercial center and many riverfront homes adjacent to Donahue Memorial Park, formerly known as Cornwall Landing.

NY-218 passes through the village and US Route 9W passes through the Town of Cornwall west of the village. Storm King State Park lies south of the village, and, below that, the United States Military Academy at West Point.

== Demographics ==
Historical population
Census	Pop.	Note	%±
1890	760		—
1900	1,966		158.7%
1910	2,658		35.2%
1920	1,755		−34.0%
1930	1,910		8.8%
1940	1,978		3.6%
1950	2,211		11.8%
1960	2,785		26.0%
1970	3,131		12.4%
1980	3,164		1.1%
1990	3,093		−2.2%
2000	3,058		−1.1%
2010	3,018		−1.3%
2020	3,075		1.9%
U.S. Decennial Census

=== 2020 census ===
As of the 2020 census, Cornwall-on-Hudson had a population of 3,075. The median age was 43.0 years. 20.7% of residents were under the age of 18 and 18.4% of residents were 65 years of age or older. For every 100 females there were 96.0 males, and for every 100 females age 18 and over there were 93.2 males age 18 and over.

87.5% of residents lived in urban areas, while 12.5% lived in rural areas.

There were 1,208 households in Cornwall-on-Hudson, of which 31.2% had children under the age of 18 living in them. Of all households, 54.6% were married-couple households, 16.7% were households with a male householder and no spouse or partner present, and 22.8% were households with a female householder and no spouse or partner present. About 24.8% of all households were made up of individuals and 9.8% had someone living alone who was 65 years of age or older.

There were 1,288 housing units, of which 6.2% were vacant. The homeowner vacancy rate was 1.0% and the rental vacancy rate was 4.9%.

Racial composition as of the 2020 census
Race	Number	Percent
White	2,598	84.5%
Black or African American	82	2.7%
American Indian and Alaska Native	9	0.3%
Asian	51	1.7%
Native Hawaiian and Other Pacific Islander	3	0.1%
Some other race	65	2.1%
Two or more races	267	8.7%
Hispanic or Latino (of any race)	277	9.0%

=== 2000 census ===
As of the census of 2000, there were 3,058 people, 1,181 households, and 824 families residing in the village. The population density was 1,560.9 inhabitants per square mile (602.7/km^{2}). There were 1,233 housing units at an average density of 629.4 per square mile (243.0/km^{2}). The racial makeup of the village was 96.63% White, 0.39% African American, 0.29% Native American, 0.65% Asian, 0.03% Pacific Islander, 0.85% from other races, and 1.14% from two or more races. Hispanic or Latino of any race were 3.79% of the population.

There were 1,181 households, out of which 34.2% had children under the age of 18 living with them, 58.0% were married couples living together, 8.9% had a female householder with no husband present, and 30.2% were non-families. 25.8% of all households were made up of individuals, and 9.5% had someone living alone who was 65 years of age or older. The average household size was 2.58 and the average family size was 3.14.

In the village, the population was distributed with 27.0% under the age of 18, 5.6% from 18 to 24, 27.9% from 25 to 44, 26.3% from 45 to 64, and 13.3% who were 65 years of age or older. The median age was 39 years. For every 100 females, there were 91.2 males. For every 100 females age 18 and over, there were 90.5 males.

The median income for a household in the village was $75,300, and the median income for a family was $88,000. Males had a median income of $55,000 versus $37,857 for females. The per capita income for the village was $31,272. About 2.6% of families and 3.9% of the population were below the poverty line, including 2.8% of those under age 18 and 3.5% of those age 65 or over.

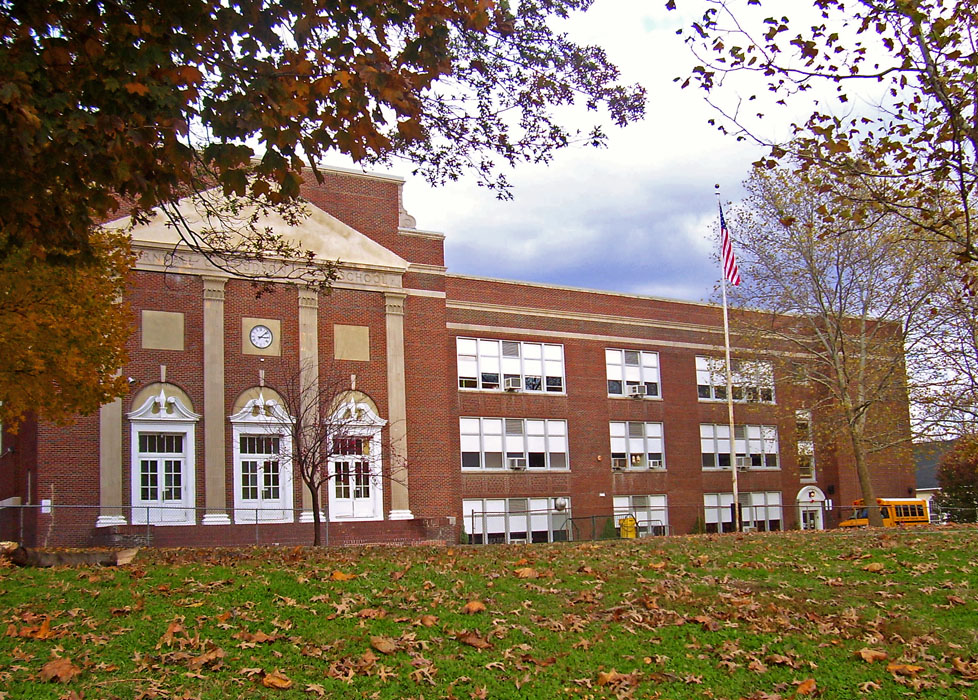
Cornwall-on-Hudson Elementary School

== Schools ==
- Cornwall-on-Hudson Elementary School
- Cornwall Central Middle School is the former Cornwall High School, located in the Town of Cornwall.
- Cornwall Central High School is located in the Town of Cornwall.
- Cornwall Elementary School at Lee Road is located in the Town of Cornwall.
- Willow Avenue Elementary School is located in the Town of Cornwall.
- New York Military Academy (NYMA, private, boarding) is located in the Town of Cornwall, and uses the mailing address of Cornwall-on-Hudson despite being just outside its official boundary.
- Storm King School (private, boarding)

== Notable people ==
- Djuna Barnes (1892–1982), writer in Greenwich Village and Paris
- Amelia Edith Huddleston Barr (1831–1919), British novelist
- Lawrence DeSmedt (1949–2004), known as Indian Larry, custom motorcycle builder and stuntman
- Malcolm Fraser (1903–1994), founder of Genuine Parts Company and Stuttering Foundation of America
- Abram P. Haring (1840–1915), American Civil War recipient of the Medal of Honor
- William Frederick Hoppe (1887–1959), known as Willie Hoppe, professional carom billiards champion
- Louis Pierre Ledoux (1912-2001), anthropologist known for studying the Murik people of Papua New Guinea
- Albrecht Pagenstecher (1839–1926), a German-American pioneer of the modern paper industry
- David Petraeus (born 1952), U.S. Army general, born and raised in Cornwall-on-Hudson
- Edward Payson Roe (1838–1888), novelist
- Robert T. Sauer (born 1948), biochemist, raised on Mountain Road, student at Cornwall Central High School
- Whit Stillman (born 1952), Oscar-nominated filmmaker
- Harriet Josephine Terry (1885–1967), African-American educator and one of the founders of Alpha Kappa Alpha sorority
- Abbott Handerson Thayer (1849–1921), artist who rented Cherry Croft before Amelia Barr
- Yasmin Vossoughian (born 1978), journalist
- Nathaniel Parker Willis (1806–1867), magazine writer, editor, and poet
- Peggy Hull (1889–1967), first accredited female war correspondent
