= Robert Sroufe =

Robert Sroufe is an American academic and professor of management and sustainability at Chatham University in Pittsburgh, Pennsylvania, where he holds the Falk Chair of Socially Responsible Management. His research focuses on sustainable business practices, integrated management, environmental management systems, and sustainable supply chain management. His scholarly work examines how organizations incorporate environmental and social considerations into business strategy, operations, and managerial decision-making. He is the author of Integrated Management: How Sustainability Creates Value for Any Business and has published research on the relationship between sustainability practices and organizational performance.

He is among the top global scientists recognized by Stanford / Elsevier researchers for career impact with published work in Business Management, Environmental Science and Economics. He is among some of the highest-ranked scholars by ScholarGPS in Integrated Management and Environmental Resources Management, in the top 0.05% of scholars in this field worldwide. His scholarly work is expansive, including sustainability, integrated management, high-performance buildings, Supply Chain Management and operations. He is the founder of the Integrated Management Institute© Website, and the Falk Chair of Socially Responsible Management at Chatham University within the interdisciplinary College of Environment, Leadership & Management (ELM). His research utilizes a systemic outlook to understand triple bottom line performance, extending TBL to the contemporary term integrated bottom line (IBL) metrics reported to internal and external stakeholders. More specifically, he focuses on the most successful systems and tools for measuring and managing the relationship between performance and the environmental, social, and financial practices of businesses. His list of publications is primarily about: how firms can create productive management systems, integrate them across business functions, and measure and manage their performance; the main drivers of sustainability; the process and importance of existing buildings becoming high-performance buildings; the UN Sustainable Development Goals; and the strategic change process that occurs during a firm's sustainable development. As an En-ROADS Climate Ambassador https://www.climateinteractive.org/en-roads/climate-ambassadors/ambassador/robert-sroufe/, Dr. Robert Sroufe facilitates interactive climate sessions using the En-ROADS Climate Solutions Simulator developed by Climate Interactive and MIT Sloan. His research publications can be found on the Google Scholar scholar.google.com/citations?user=c5C2dPIAAAAJ&hl=en, and Research Gate www.researchgate.net/profile/Robert-Sroufe?ev=hdr_xprf platforms. Michigan State University conferred him a Ph.D.

== Education and Academic Career ==
He earned his Ph.D. in Operations as well as a dual M.B.A. in Materials and Logistics Management, along with Procurement from Michigan State University. He began his teaching career during his time at Michigan State University.

He is currently at Chatham University. Before starting the MBA-Sustainable Business Practices program at Duquesne University, he was an assistant professor at Boston College focused on operations management. He has also held professional positions with the Department of Defense, the National Pollution Prevention Center, and is involved in advising and consulting for a variety of firms and is a keynote speaker.

== Selected Awards and Recognition ==
The Aspen Institute Business & Society Program awarded him the Ideas Worth Teaching Award for his course Sustainability Tools and Processes for New Initiatives. He received the Academy of Management Organizations & Natural Environment (ONE) Division Inaugural Teaching Award and the Wickham Skinner Teaching Innovative Award from the Production and Operations Management Production Society (POMS). He was a finalist for the Aspen Institute's Faculty Pioneer Award. The Decision Sciences Institute awarded him with the Instructional Innovation Award for his Sustainability Tools and Processes for New Initiatives course. Dr. Sroufe was awarded the University Creative Teaching Award by Duquesne University. As the curriculum lead for the MBA-Sustainable Business Practices program, he was part of the faculty that awarded the Page Prize for Best U.S. Environmental Curriculum. Under the direction of Dr. Robert Sroufe, Duquesne University's MBA-Sustainable Business Practices program was ranked as the #1 Better World MBA program in the United States and #4 program in the world by Corporate Knights Magazine.

== Research and Scholarship ==
His work has been featured in a number of journals, including the Journal of Operations Management, the Production and Operations Management Society, the European Journal of Operations Research, the Journal of Supply Chain Management, International Journal of Production Research, the Production and Inventory Management Journal, Greener Management International, and Business Strategy and the Environment. His book Integrated Management: How Sustainability Creates Value for Any Business was released in first edition and second editions while also awarded the Responsible Research in Business and Management, co-sponsored by the International Association for Chinese Management Research and the Community for Responsible Research in Business and Management. This book is used as the basis for curriculum in the top-ranked MBA Sustainability programs in the USA and other programs internationally. His book Developing Sustainable Supply Chains: Management Insights, Issues, and Tools, co-authored by Steven A. Melnyk, was awarded the Best Book Award from the Academy of Management Organizations and the Environment Division and included in the Sustainable Brands Top Sustainability Books Collection. The supply chain books have evolved into their third edition as Strategic Sustainable Supply Chain Management (S3CM) books for practitioners and academic programs.

== Selected Publications ==
Books

- Sroufe, Robert (2025). Integrated Management: How Sustainability Creates Value for any Business, 2nd Ed. doi:10.1108/9781836081128. ISBN 978-1-83608-113-5.
- Sroufe, R.P., and Melnyk, S.A., Developing Strategic Sustainable Supply Chains: Management Insights, Issues, and Tools: 3rd Edition Foundations, (ISBN 9781637427637) (e-copy); (ISBN 9781637427620) (hard copy); Publisher: Business Expert Press
- Sroufe, R.P., and Melnyk, S.A., Developing Strategic Sustainable Supply Chains: Management Insights, Issues, and Tools: 3rd Edition Implementation, (ISBN 9781637427644) (e-book); (ISBN 9781637427644) (hard copy); Publisher: Business Expert Press
- Sroufe, R., Stevenson, C., and Eckenrode, B., The Power of Existing Buildings: Save Money, Improve Health, and Reduce Environmental Impacts, (ISBN 9781642830507) Publisher: Island Press,
- Sroufe, R.P., and Melnyk, S.A., Developing Sustainable Supply Chains: Management Insights, Issues, and Tools, ISBN 978-1-60649-372-4 (e-book); ISBN 978-1-60649-371-7 (paperback) Publisher: Business Expert Press
- Sroufe, R.P., and Sarkis J., Strategic Sustainability: The State of the Art in Corporate Environmental Management Systems, Book publisher: Greenleaf Publishing, foreword by ANSI-ASQ National Accreditation Board (ANAB), ISBN 9781874719618

Selected articles:

- Fernando, Yudi; Sroufe, Robert; Tseng, Ming-Lang; Shaharudin, Muhammad Shabir; Wahyuni-TD, Ika Sari; Jawo, Muhammed (3 October 2025). "The circular supply chains in smart cities: a catalyst for sustainable development". Journal of Industrial and Production Engineering. 42 (7): 730–754. doi:10.1080/21681015.2025.2497867.
- Ikram, Muhammad; Sroufe, Robert (March 2025). "A novel sequential block path planning method for 3D unmanned aerial vehicle routing in sustainable supply chains". Supply Chain Analytics. 9 100094. doi:10.1016/j.sca.2024.100094.
- Jum'a, Luay; Zimon, Dominik; Sroufe, Robert; Tyan, Jonah (September 2024). "Sustainable supply chain management's impact on triple bottom line performance: Does the firm size matter?". Corporate Social Responsibility and Environmental Management. 31 (5): 4673–4693. doi:10.1002/csr.2826.
- Atkins, Ryan; Deranek, Kim; Sroufe, Robert (22 February 2024). "Overcoming the barriers to food recovery". Supply Chain Management. 29 (2): 388–405. doi:10.1108/SCM-03-2023-0132.
- Umar, Muhammad; Ahmad, Arslan; Sroufe, Robert; Muhammad, Zikri (29 January 2024). "The nexus between green intellectual capital, blockchain technology, green manufacturing, and sustainable performance". Environmental Science and Pollution Research. 31 (10): 15026–15038. doi:10.1007/s11356-024-31952-8. PMID 38285260.
- Nureen, Naila; Liu, Da; Irfan, Muhammad; Sroufe, Robert (31 May 2023). "Greening the manufacturing firms: do green supply chain management and organizational citizenship behavior influence firm performance?". Environmental Science and Pollution Research. 30 (31): 77246–77261. doi:10.1007/s11356-023-27817-1. PMC 10230137. PMID 37256396.
- Fura, Barbara; Sroufe, Robert; Hajduk-Stelmachowicz, Marzena; Stecko, Justyna (31 December 2023). "A Differentiation of the Benefits of Iso 14001 Adoption in Manufacturing Companies". Humanities and Social Sciences Quarterly. 30 (4 - part I): 49–70. doi:10.7862/rz.2023.hss.42.
- Sroufe, Robert; Atkins, Ryan; Curkovic, Sime (2023). "Purchasing and supply management empowerment in the new product development process". International Journal of Value Chain Management. 14 (4): 459–480. doi:10.1504/IJVCM.2023.135631.
- Ong, Tze San; Lee, Ah Suat; Latif, Badar; Sroufe, Robert; Sharif, Arshian; Heng Teh, Boon (December 2022). "Enabling green shared vision: linking environmental strategic focus and environmental performance through ISO 14001 and technological capabilities". Environmental Science and Pollution Research. 30 (11): 31711–31726. doi:10.1007/s11356-022-24280-2. PMID 36454525.
- Mària SJ, Joseph F; Sroufe, Robert (28 June 2022). "The Management for Global Sustainability Opportunity: Integrating Responsibility, Sustainability, and Spirituality". Journal of Management for Global Sustainability. 10 (1). doi:10.13185/2244-6893.1156.
- Song, Wenyan; Han, Yi Hubert; Sroufe, Robert (4 October 2022). "Substitution and complementarity dynamics in configurations of sustainable management practices". International Journal of Operations & Production Management. 42 (11): 1711–1731. doi:10.1108/IJOPM-10-2021-0647.
- Fernando, Yudi; Tseng, Ming-Lang; Wahyuni-TD, Ika Sari; Sroufe, Robert; Mohd-Zailani, Nik Ida Amiera (2 November 2023). "Blockchain technology adoption for carbon trading and energy efficiency: ISO manufacturing firms in Malaysia". International Journal of Logistics Research and Applications. 26 (11): 1556–1577. doi:10.1080/13675567.2022.2090527.
- Awan, Usama; Sroufe, Robert; Bozan, Karoly (9 June 2022). "Designing Value Chains for Industry 4.0 and a Circular Economy: A Review of the Literature". Sustainability. 14 (12): 7084. doi:10.3390/su14127084.
- Sroufe, Robert; Watts, Alec (July 2022). "Pathways to Agricultural Decarbonization: Climate Change Obstacles and Opportunities in the US". Resources, Conservation and Recycling. 182 106276. doi:10.1016/j.resconrec.2022.106276.
- Zhong, Ruoyu; Ren, Xuedi; Akbar, Muhammad Waqas; Zia, Zeenat; Sroufe, Robert (July 2022). "Striving towards sustainable development: how environmental degradation and energy efficiency interact with health expenditures in SAARC countries". Environmental Science and Pollution Research. 29 (31): 46898–46915. doi:10.1007/s11356-022-18819-6. PMC 8853387. PMID 35171428.
- Awan, Usama; Sroufe, Robert (30 January 2022). "Sustainability in the Circular Economy: Insights and Dynamics of Designing Circular Business Models". Applied Sciences. 12 (3): 1521. doi:10.3390/app12031521.
- Ikram, Muhammad; Sroufe, Robert; Awan, Usama; Abid, Nabila (27 December 2021). "Enabling Progress in Developing Economies: A Novel Hybrid Decision-Making Model for Green Technology Planning". Sustainability. 14 (1): 258. doi:10.3390/su14010258.
- Saeed, Asif; Sroufe, Robert (6 December 2021). "Performance, Risk, and Cost of Capital: Trends and Opportunities for Future CSR Research". Journal of Risk and Financial Management. 14 (12): 586. doi:10.3390/jrfm14120586. hdl:10419/258689.
- Fernando, Yudi; Tseng, Ming-Lang; Sroufe, Robert; Abideen, Ahmed Zainul; Shaharudin, Muhammad Shabir; Jose, Rajan (October 2021). "Eco-innovation impacts on recycled product performance and competitiveness: Malaysian automotive industry". Sustainable Production and Consumption. 28: 1677–1686. doi:10.1016/j.spc.2021.09.010.
- Ikram, Muhammad; Ferasso, Marcos; Sroufe, Robert; Zhang, Qingyu (November 2021). "Assessing green technology indicators for cleaner production and sustainable investments in a developing country context". Journal of Cleaner Production. 322 129090. doi:10.1016/j.jclepro.2021.129090.
- Fernando, Yudi; Tseng, Ming-Lang; Sroufe, Robert; Abideen, Ahmed Zainul; Shaharudin, Muhammad Shabir; Jose, Rajan (October 2021). "Eco-innovation impacts on recycled product performance and competitiveness: Malaysian automotive industry". Sustainable Production and Consumption. 28: 1677–1686. doi:10.1016/j.spc.2021.09.010.
- Bratt, Cecilia; Sroufe, Robert; Broman, Göran (21 July 2021). "Implementing Strategic Sustainable Supply Chain Management". Sustainability. 13 (15): 8132. doi:10.3390/su13158132.
- Zimon, Dominik; Madzík, Peter; Dellana, Scott; Sroufe, Robert; Ikram, Muhammad; Lysenko-Ryba, Kateryna (4 June 2021). "Environmental effects of ISO 9001 and ISO 14001 management system implementation in SSCM". The TQM Journal. doi:10.1108/TQM-01-2021-0025.
- Ikram, Muhammad; Zhang, Qingyu; Sroufe, Robert; Ferasso, Marcos (October 2021). "Contribution of certification bodies and sustainability standards to sustainable development goals: An integrated grey systems approach". Sustainable Production and Consumption. 28: 326–345. doi:10.1016/j.spc.2021.05.019.
- Awan, Usama; Sroufe, Robert; Shahbaz, Muhammad (May 2021). "Industry 4.0 and the circular economy: A literature review and recommendations for future research". Business Strategy and the Environment. 30 (4): 2038–2060. doi:10.1002/bse.2731.
- Ikram, Muhammad; Sroufe, Robert; Zhang, Qingyu; Ferasso, Marcos (April 2021). "Assessment and prediction of environmental sustainability: novel grey models comparative analysis of China vs. the USA". Environmental Science and Pollution Research. 28 (14): 17891–17912. doi:10.1007/s11356-020-11418-3. PMID 33405164.
- Sroufe, Robert (December 2020). "Business Schools as Living Labs: Advancing Sustainability in Management Education". Journal of Management Education. 44 (6): 726–765. doi:10.1177/1052562920951590.
- Sroufe, Robert; Na, Stuart; Na, Hunter (2 July 2021). "Transforming Business Education: 21st Century Sustainable MBA Programs". Journal of Management for Global Sustainability. 9 (1): 15–41. doi:10.13185/JM2021.09102.
- Ikram, Muhammad; Zhang, Qingyu; Sroufe, Robert (17 November 2021). "Future of quality management system (ISO 9001) certification: novel grey forecasting approach". Total Quality Management & Business Excellence. 32 (15–16): 1666–1693. doi:10.1080/14783363.2020.1768062.
- Ikram, M.; Sroufe, Robert; Rehman, E.; Shah, S.Z.A.; Mahmoudi, A. (May 2020). "Do Quality, Environmental, and Social (QES) Certifications Improve International Trade? A Comparative Grey Relation Analysis of Developing vs. Developed Countries". Physica A: Statistical Mechanics and Its Applications. 545 123486. Bibcode:2020PhyA..54523486I. doi:10.1016/j.physa.2019.123486.
- Zimon, Dominik; Madzik, Peter; Sroufe, Robert (23 May 2020). "The Influence of ISO 9001 & ISO 14001 on Sustainable Supply Chain Management in the Textile Industry". Sustainability. 12 (10): 4282. Bibcode:2020Sust...12.4282Z. doi:10.3390/su12104282.
- Zimon, Dominik; Madzik, Peter; Sroufe, Robert (13 December 2019). "Management systems and improving supply chain processes: Perspectives of focal companies and logistics service providers". International Journal of Retail & Distribution Management. 48 (9): 939–961. doi:10.1108/IJRDM-04-2019-0107.
- Awan, Usama; Sroufe, Robert (June 2020). "Interorganisational collaboration for innovation improvement in manufacturing firms's: The mediating role of social performance". International Journal of Innovation Management. 24 (5): 2050049. doi:10.1142/S1363919620500498.
- Shaharudin, Muhammad Shabir; Fernando, Yudi; Chiappetta Jabbour, Charbel Jose; Sroufe, Robert; Jasmi, Muhamad Fairuz Ahmad (May 2019). "Past, present, and future low carbon supply chain management: A content review using social network analysis". Journal of Cleaner Production. 218: 629–643. Bibcode:2019JCPro.218..629S. doi:10.1016/j.jclepro.2019.02.016.
- Ikram, Muhammad; Sroufe, Robert; Mohsin, Muhammad; Solangi, Yasir Ahmed; Shah, Syed Zulfiqar Ali; Shahzad, Farrukh (11 November 2019). "Does CSR influence firm performance? A longitudinal study of SME sectors of Pakistan". Journal of Global Responsibility. 11 (1): 27–53. doi:10.1108/JGR-12-2018-0088.
- Zimon, Dominik; Tyan, Jonah; Sroufe, Robert (16 December 2019). "Implementing Sustainable Supply Chain Management: Reactive, Cooperative, and Dynamic Models". Sustainability. 11 (24): 7227. Bibcode:2019Sust...11.7227Z. doi:10.3390/su11247227.
- Sroufe, Robert; Gopalakrishna-Remani, Venugopal (September 2019). "Management, Social Sustainability, Reputation, and Financial Performance Relationships: An Empirical Examination of U.S. Firms". Organization & Environment. 32 (3): 331–362. doi:10.1177/1086026618756611.
- Sroufe, Robert (September 2017). "Integration and organizational change towards sustainability". Journal of Cleaner Production. 162: 315–329. Bibcode:2017JCPro.162..315S. doi:10.1016/j.jclepro.2017.05.180.
- Laszlo, Chris; Sroufe, Robert; Waddock, Sandra (2017). "Torn Between Two Paradigms: A Struggle for the Soul of Business Schools". AI Practitioner. 19 (2): 108–119. doi:10.12781/978-1-907549-31-1-12.
- Sroufe, Robert; Ramos, Diane P. (April 2015). "Leveraging Collaborative, Thematic Problem-Based Learning to Integrate Curricula". Decision Sciences Journal of Innovative Education. 13 (2): 151–176. doi:10.1111/dsji.12063.
- Sroufe, Robert; Sivasubramaniam, Nagaraj; Ramos, Diane; Saiia, David (April 2015). "Aligning the PRME: How Study Abroad Nurtures Responsible Leadership". Journal of Management Education. 39 (2): 244–275. doi:10.1177/1052562914560795.
- Sroufe, Robert (31 December 2013). "Life Cycle Assessment within MBA Courses: A Tool for Integrating Sustainability". Operations Management Education Review. 7: 95–117.
- Sroufe, Robert; Ramos, Diane (September 2011). "MBA Program Trends and Best Practices in Teaching Sustainability: Live Project Courses". Decision Sciences Journal of Innovative Education. 9 (3): 349–369. doi:10.1111/j.1540-4609.2011.00315.x.
- Sroufe, Robert; Curkovic, Sime (July 2008). "An examination of ISO 9000:2000 and supply chain quality assurance". Journal of Operations Management. 26 (4): 503–520. doi:10.1016/j.jom.2007.06.006.
- Sroufe, Robert; Montabon, Frank; Narasimhan, Ram; Wang, Xinyan (2002). "Environmental Management Practices: A Framework". Greener Management International (40): 23–44. doi:10.9774/GLEAF.3062.2002.wi.00004. JSTOR greemanainte.40.23. Gale A112128985.
- Sroufe, Robert (September 2003). "Effects of Environmental Management Systems on Environmental Management Practices and Operations". Production and Operations Management. 12 (3): 416–431. doi:10.1111/j.1937-5956.2003.tb00212.x.
- Melnyk, Steven A; Sroufe, Robert P; Calantone, Roger (May 2003). "Assessing the impact of environmental management systems on corporate and environmental performance". Journal of Operations Management. 21 (3): 329–351. doi:10.1016/S0272-6963(02)00109-2.
- Handfield, Robert; Walton, Steven V; Sroufe, Robert; Melnyk, Steven A (August 2002). "Applying environmental criteria to supplier assessment: A study in the application of the Analytical Hierarchy Process". European Journal of Operational Research. 141 (1): 70–87. doi:10.1016/S0377-2217(01)00261-2.
- Melnyk, S. A.; Sroufe, R. P.; Calantone, R. L.; Montabon, F. L. (January 2002). "Assessing the effectiveness of US voluntary environmental programmes: An empirical study". International Journal of Production Research. 40 (8): 1853–1878. doi:10.1080/00207540110118398.
- Melnyk, Steven A.; Sroufe, Robert; Montabon, Frank (22 June 2001). "How does management view environmentally responsible manufacturing?". Production & Inventory Management Journal: 55–65. Gale A86054363 ProQuest 199926663.
- Sroufe, Robert; Curkovic, Sime; Montabon, Frank; Melnyk, Steven A. (February 2000). "The new product design process and design for environment: "Crossing the chasm"". International Journal of Operations & Production Management. 20 (2): 267–291. doi:10.1108/01443570010304297.
- Montabon, Frank; Melnyk, Steven A.; Sroufe, Robert; Calantone, Roger J (March 2000). "ISO 14000: Assessing Its Perceived Impact on Corporate Performance". Journal of Supply Chain Management. 36 (1): 4–16. doi:10.1111/j.1745-493X.2000.tb00073.x.
