= Old Landmarks and Historic Personages of Boston =

Work by Samuel Adams Drake

- The title page of the 1900 new and revised edition of the book
- Author: Samuel Adams Drake
- Language: English
- Genre: History
- Publisher: James R. Osgood and Company
- Publication date: 1873 (153 years ago)
- Publication place: United States
- Media type: Hardback book
- Pages: 484

Old Landmarks and Historic Personages of Boston is a book by Samuel Adams Drake, published in 1873 by James R. Osgood and Company.

Drake wrote the book's preface in Boston on October 22, 1872. In it, he informs the reader that the purpose of the book is twofold: to preserve, in literary form, the "old landmarks, now so rapidly disappearing before the era of improvement," and to fulfill the "very general desire to know where the actors lived who have given Boston such prominence in the history of our country."

While the book was going to press, the Great Boston Fire of 1872 occurred, consuming 776 buildings.

A new and revised edition was published by Little, Brown and Company in 1900. Although the text "shows frequent alterations from that of the first edition," ... "they are for the most part slight in character." The description of the Boston Athenaeum was rewritten, as were others, in order to reflect the changes to the landmarks over the previous 25 years. The preface was also rewritten and full-page illustrations were added.

== Chapters ==
The book contains fifteen chapters:

1. King's Chapel and the Neighborhood
2. From the Orange-Tree to the Old Brick
3. From the Old State House to Boston Pier
4. Brattle Square and the Town Dock
5. From Boston Stone to the North Battery
6. A Visit to the Old Shipyards
7. Copp's Hill and the Vicinity
8. The Old South and Province House
9. From the Old South round Fort Hill
10. A tour round the Common
11. A tour round the Common continued
12. Valley Acre, the Bowling Green, and West Boston
13. From Church Green to Liberty Tree
14. Liberty Tree and the Neighborhood
15. The Neck and the Fortifications

== Reception ==
In the January 1874 edition of The New England Historical and Genealogical Register, described the publication as being "received by the public, not of Boston alone, with great and deserved favor."
