= Samuel Adams Drake =

American journalist and writer (1833–1905)

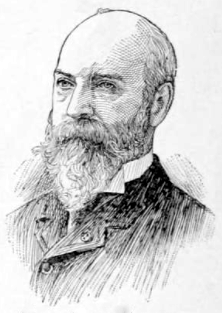
- Born: December 20, 1833; Boston, Massachusetts
- Died: December 4, 1905 (aged 71); Kennebunkport, Maine
- Occupations: Journalist, writer
- Spouses: Isabelle G. Mayhew (m. 1858) Olive Nowell Grant (m. 1867)

Samuel Adams Drake (December 20, 1833 – December 4, 1905) was an American journalist and writer.

== Early life ==
Samuel Adams Drake was born in Boston in 1833, a son of Samuel Gardner Drake and Louisa Elmes. He was educated in the public schools of Boston.

== Career ==
Drake went to Kansas in 1858 as telegraphic agent of the New York Associated Press, became the regular correspondent of the St. Louis Republican and the Louisville Journal, and for a while edited the Leavenworth Times. In 1861, he joined the state militia and served throughout the American Civil War, becoming brigadier general of militia in 1863. In 1864, he was colonel of the 17th Kansas Volunteers, commanding the post of Paola, Kansas, during Price's invasion of Missouri in that year.

He returned to Boston in 1871 and resumed literary work.

== Personal life ==
Drake married Isabelle G. Mayhew in 1858. In 1867, he remarried, to Olive Nowell Grant.

== Death ==
He died in Kennebunkport, Maine, in 1905. He was interred in Wyoming Cemetery in Melrose, Massachusetts.

== Works ==
- Hints for Emigrants to Pike's Peak, a pamphlet and his first publication (1860)
- Old Landmarks and Historic Personages of Boston (1873)
- Nooks and Corners of the New England Coast (1875)
- Bunker Hill (1875)
- Captain Nelson (1879)
- History of Middlesex County, Massachusetts (1880)
- Around the Hub (1881)
- Heart of the White Mountains (1882) illustrated by William Hamilton Gibson
- New England Legends and Folk Lore (1884)
- Our Great Benefactors (1885)
- The Making of New England (1886)
- The Making of the Great West (1887)
- Burgoyne's Invasion (1889)
- The Taking of Louisburg (1891)
- The Pine Tree Coast (1891)
- The Battle of Gettysburg (1892)
- The Making of Virginia (1893)
- Our Colonial Homes (1894)
- The Campaign of Trenton (1895)
- The Watch Fires of '76 (1895)
- On Plymouth Rock (1898)
- The Myths and Fables of To-day (1900)
- The Young Vigilantes (1904)
