= United Methodist Church of the Highlands =

Historic church in New York, United States

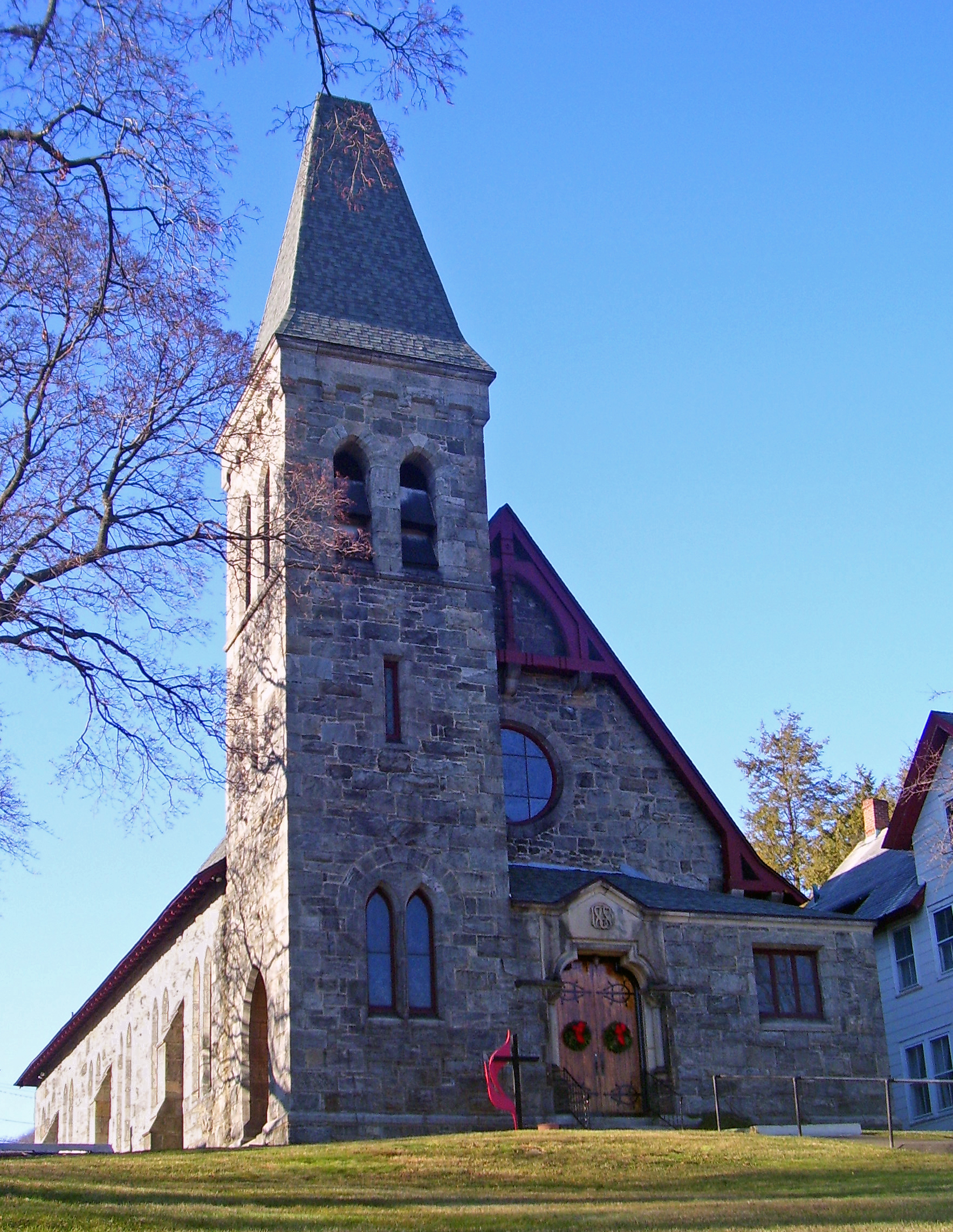
- East (front) elevation and south profile, 2008

Religion
- Affiliation: United Methodist Church, formerly the Presbyterian Church USA
- Leadership: Pastor Karina Feliz

Location
- Location: Highland Falls, NY, USA
- Interactive map of United Methodist Church of the Highlands
- Coordinates: 41°22′17″N 73°57′54″W

Architecture
- Architect: Frederick Clarke Withers
- Style: Gothic Revival
- Completed: 1868

Specifications
- Direction of façade: east
- Spire: 1
- Materials: Stone

U.S. National Register of Historic Places
- Added to NRHP: November 23, 1982
- NRHP Reference no.: 82001216

Website
- United Methodist Church of the Highlands

The United Methodist Church of the Highlands, originally First Presbyterian Church of Highland Falls, is a historic church located on Main Street in Highland Falls, New York, designed by notable Gothic Revival architect Frederick Clarke Withers.

It was the first church founded in the village. In 1982 it was listed on the National Register of Historic Places, along with other properties in the Hudson Highlands.

== Building ==
The church is located on the west side of Main Street in downtown Highland Falls, north of Tobin Lane. Across Main and the West Point Highway is the large complex around the United States Military Academy's Thayer Hotel and the parking lot for the West Point Museum. Another church, Sacred Heart, is to the north, with its school to the west. A residential area is to the south.

The building itself is a three-bay blue granite structure with a steep gabled nave. On the east (front) facade is a narthex with an engaged bell tower on the southern end. It is topped with a steeply pitched slate roof, with a corbeled cornice and lancet windows below. The main entrance, a pair of heavy wooden doors in the center of the narthex, is framed by recessed columns with foliated capitals. On a projecting pediment above is a carved datestone.

There is a single casement window in the narthex to the north of the door. Above the narthex, in the nave's gable field, is a large round window. The side elevations of the building have six pairs of lancet windows, separated by wall buttresses.

== History ==
The church was founded by five residents who met at first in a building on Mill Street in 1830. It was the first church established in Highland Falls. By 1867 the parish was large enough to erect its own church.

The half-acre (2,000 m²) site was acquired from the estate of W.B. Cozzens. A design was commissioned from the firm of Wycliff and Baldwin, but it was never used. Instead money from the lecture tours of Edward Payson Roe, the pastor at the time who later became a popular novelist, and donations from friends helped the church commission and build the Withers design. John Bigelow, former ambassador to France and a summer resident of the village, attended the dedication ceremony.

== See also ==
- Hudson Highlands Multiple Resource Area
- National Register of Historic Places listings in Orange County, New York
