= Edward Payson Roe =

American novelist

Rev. Edward Payson Roe
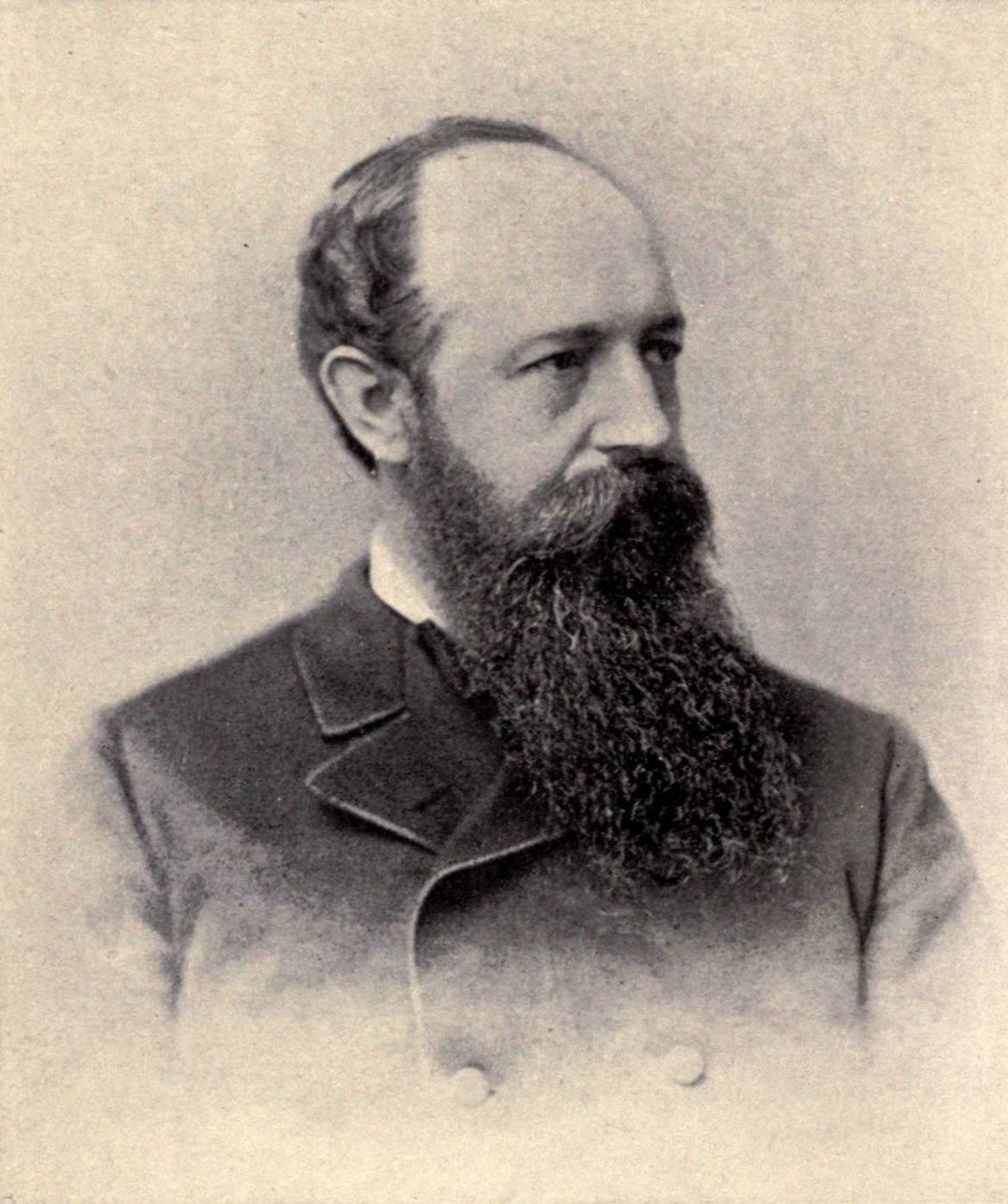
- Born: March 7, 1838; Moodna, New Windsor, New York
- Died: July 19, 1888 (aged 50); Cornwall on Hudson, New York
- Resting place: Willow Dell Cemetery, Cornwall on Hudson, New York
- Education: Williams College, Auburn Theological Seminary
- Occupations: Novelist, Presbyterian minister
- Notable work: Barriers Burned Away (1872); Without a Home (1881); Opening of a Chestnut Burr (1874)
- Style: Christian novel
- Spouse: Anna Paulina Sands
- Relatives: William James Roe (first cousin)

Edward Payson Roe (March 7, 1838 – July 19, 1888) was an American novelist, Presbyterian minister, horticulturist and historian.

== Biography ==
Edward Payson Roe was born in the village of Moodna, now part of New Windsor, New York. He studied at Williams College and at Auburn Theological Seminary. In 1862 he became chaplain of the Second New York Cavalry, U.S.V., and in 1864 chaplain of Hampton Hospital, in Virginia. In 1866-74 he was pastor of the First Presbyterian Church at Highland Falls, New York. In 1874 he removed to Cornwall-on-Hudson, where he devoted himself to the writing of fiction and to horticulture. During the American Civil War, he wrote weekly letters to the New York Evangelist, and subsequently lectured on the war and wrote for periodicals.

He married Anna Paulina Sands in 1863 and had several children. His daughter Sarah married the Olympic fencer Charles T. Tatham, and daughter Pauline married the landscape painter Henry Charles Lee.

Edward Payson Roe Memorial Park in Cornwall-on-Hudson, New York is dedicated to his honor.

== Writings ==
His novels were very popular in their day, especially with middle class readers in England and America, and were translated into several European languages. Their strong moral and religious purpose, did much to break down a Puritan prejudice in America against works of fiction. One of his most consistent criticisms was that his work resembled sermons. Among his novels and horticultural writings were:

- Barriers Burned Away (1872), which first appeared as a serial in the Evangelist and made him widely known
- What Can She Do? (1873)
- Opening of a Chestnut Burr (1874)
- From Jest to Earnest (1875)
- Near to Nature's Heart (1876)
- A Knight of the Nineteenth Century (1877)
- A Face Illumined (1878)
- A Day of Fate (1880)
- Without a Home (1881)
- His Sombre Rivals (1883)
- Nature's Serial Story (1884) illustrated by W. Hamilton Gibson and F. Dielman
- A Young Girl's Wooing (1884)
- An Original Belle (1885)
- Driven Back to Eden (1885)
- He Fell in Love with his Wife (1886)
- The Hornet's Nest: A Story of Love and War (1886)
- The Earth Trembled (1887)
- Miss Lou (left unfinished 1888)
- Play and Profit in My Garden (1873)
- Success with Small Fruits (1881)
- The Home Acre (1887)
- Found Yet Lost (1888)

His first novel inspired an eponymous movie, Barriers Burned Away, released in 1925 by W.S. Van Dyke.

== Biography ==
- Carey, G.O. (1985). Edward Payson Roe. Twayne's United States authors series. Twayne Publishers. ISBN 978-0-8057-7421-4.
