= Cornwall Central High School =

High school in New Windsor, New York, US

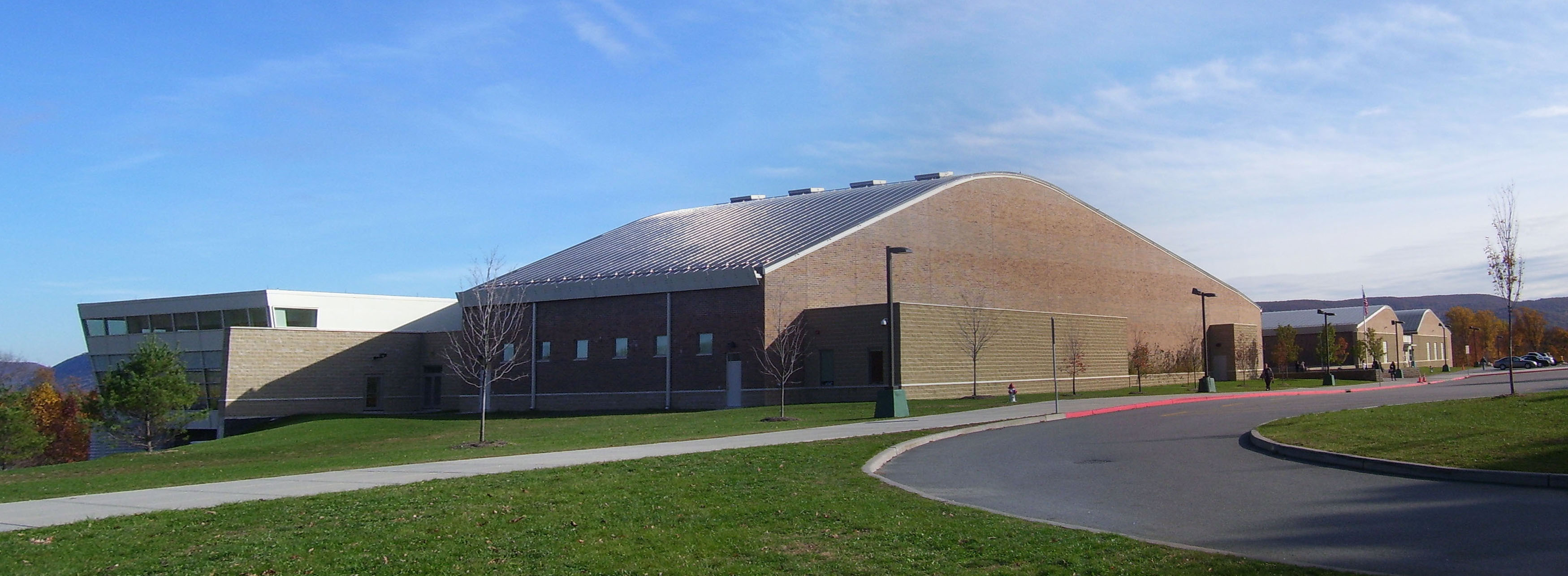

Location
- 10 Dragon Drive; New Windsor, NY 12553
- Coordinates: 41°26′44″N 74°04′30″W

Information
- School type: Public, High school
- School district: Cornwall Central School District
- Principal: Kathryn Wilhelm
- Staff: 76.22 (FTE)
- Grades: 9-12
- Enrollment: 1,022 (2023–2024)
- Student to teacher ratio: 13.41
- Language: English
- Hours in school day: 7
- Campus size: 50 acres (20 ha)
- Campus type: rural
- Colors: Green and white
- Mascot: Dragon
- Team name: Dragons
- Communities served: Cornwall on Hudson; Cornwall; New Windsor (part); Woodbury (part)
- Website: Cornwall Central High School

Cornwall Central High School is the high school serving the Cornwall Central School District in Orange County, New York. It draws students from portions of three towns: Cornwall, New Windsor, and Woodbury, as well as the village of Cornwall-on-Hudson. While it is in the New Windsor ZIP Code, it is located off NY 94 just inside the Cornwall town line.

== History ==
Two of Cornwall's elementary schools (Willow Avenue and Cornwall-on-Hudson) and the current middle school have served as the district's high school in the past. However, by the late 1990s, with Cornwall's booming population, it was clear that a new building was necessary for the upper grades, and the district sought to build a new high school.

Attempts to site the school more centrally within the district near US 9W failed when opposition from a local community activist led to the defeat of a bond issue that would have funded the building. In 1999, voters approved $13 million for the current building (the state picked up the remainder).

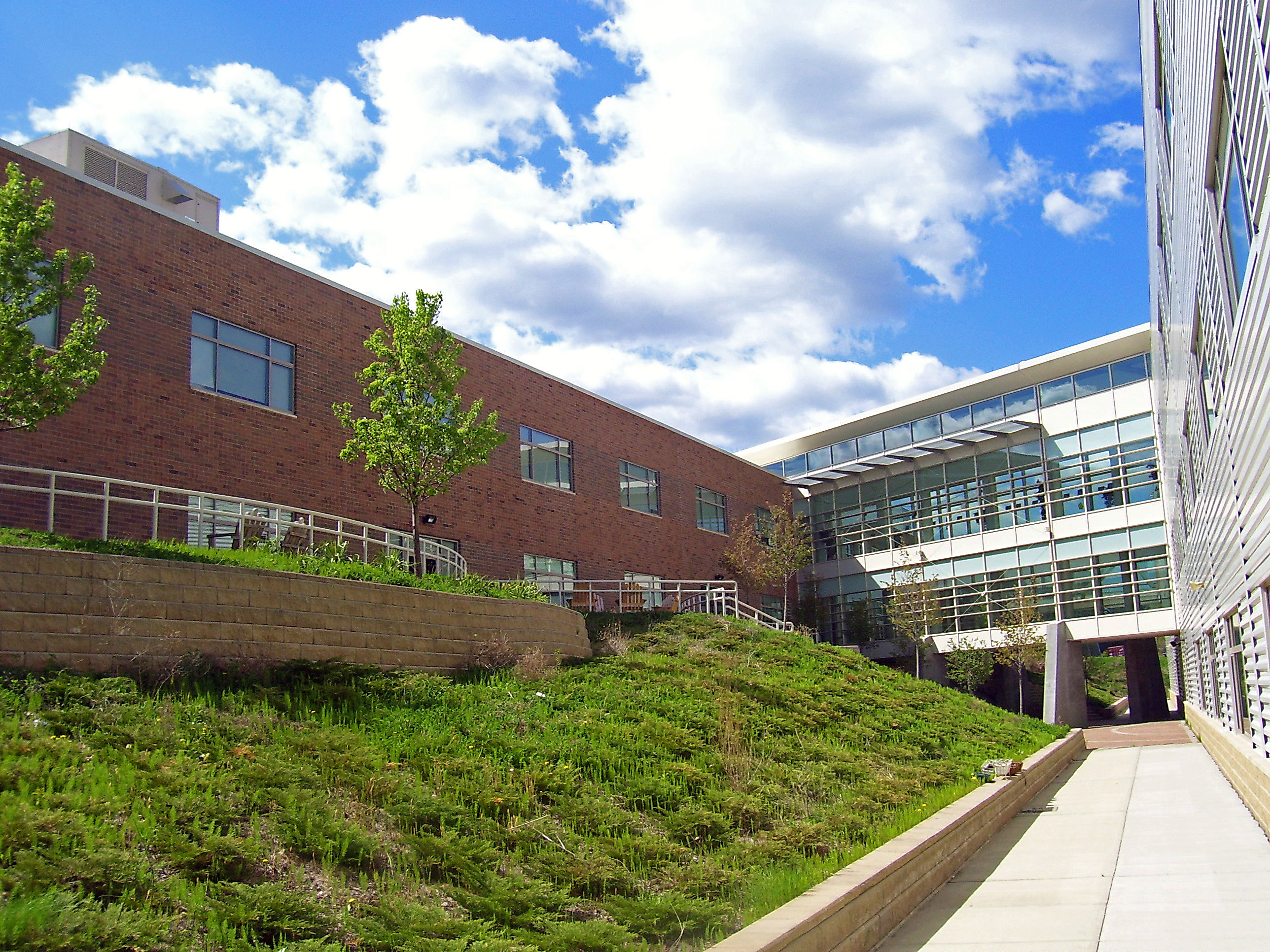
The two wings, with connecting walkways.

== Building ==
The current building by CannonDesign, completed in 2003 at a cost of $44.6 million, is the newest high school in Orange County. Its design, frequently compared to an airport terminal, connects two otherwise separate structures built into the 50 acre (20 ha) site's gentle slope with glass-enclosed overhead and ground-level walkways. There are five separate levels, totaling 208,000 square feet (18,720 m^{2}) with a courtyard-like space in between the two. All interiors are painted predominantly white, adorned with student artwork and porcelain tile walls, and colorful accents on classroom floors.

The classroom corridors in the rear structure intersect the walkways at oblique angles, meant to echo (along with the steel latticework on the elevated walkways) the railroads in the region's history, particularly the nearby Moodna Viaduct, a spectacular trestle and local landmark depicted on a student painting above the entrance to the library.

The library and cafeteria are located on the uppermost level. Their windows flare outward, suggesting a control tower and taking in the ample views of the Hudson Highlands and Storm King Mountain available from the site. The main art room can be viewed through a glass wall adjacent to the main office, and has a separate gallery level. Also up front is an open commons area where students may eat and relax.

Not only does the current design allow for a maximum of 1,500 students, more than it currently holds, it can be easily expanded if the need arises at some point in the future. (Needs to be verified, woods and a large slope are to the only possible expansion areas.)

The school is divided by academic department by wing.

== Campus ==
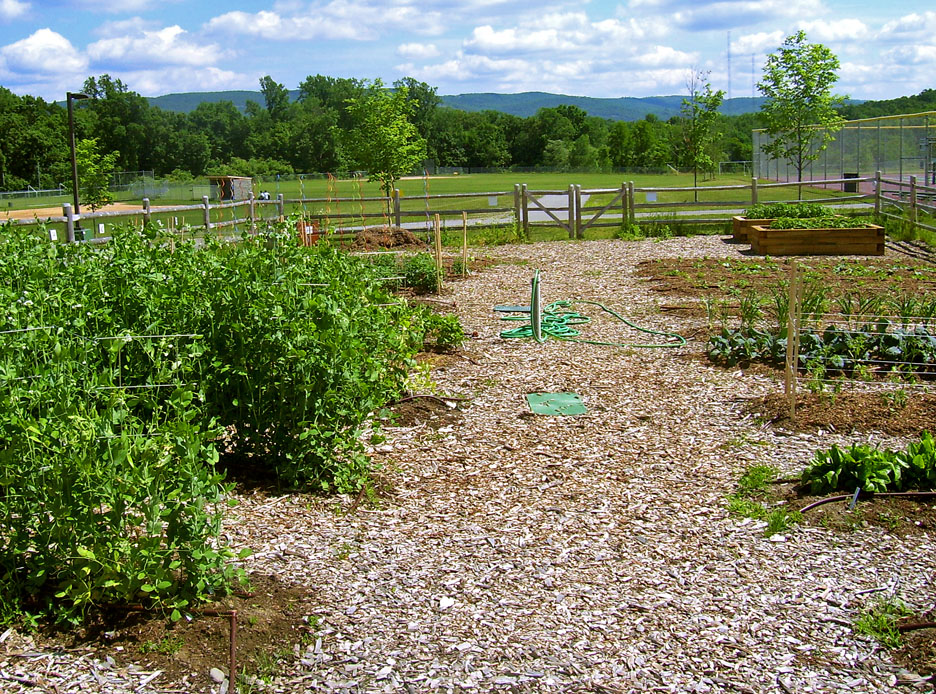
Organic garden

Surrounding the building are several athletic fields, tennis courts, a football field, and a track. Students have also started an organic garden on the grounds, with the help of a teacher.

== Notable alumni ==
- Armand Assante (1968)
- David Petraeus (1970)
- Angie Paccione (1978)
- Aisling Cuffe (2010)

== Sports ==
2007/2008 Section 9 Titles:

- Football
- Boys Soccer
- Girls Soccer
- Girls Cross Country Running
- Boys Cross Country Running
- Girls Volleyball
- Girls Basketball
- Baseball
- Boys and girls Track and Field
- Wrestling
- Cheerleading
