= Genuine Parts Company =

Auto/industrial/electronic parts

- Type: Public
- Traded as: NYSE: GPC; S&P 500 component
- Founded: 1928; 98 years ago, in Atlanta, Georgia, U.S.
- Founder: Carlyle and Malcolm Fraser
- Headquarters: Atlanta, Georgia, U.S.
- Key people: Paul Donahue (executive chairman); Will Stengel (CEO)
- Revenue: US$24.3 billion (2025)
- Net income: ▼US$65.9 million (2025)
- Number of employees: 60,000
- Subsidiaries: NAPA Auto Parts; Motion Industries
- Website: www.genpt.com

Genuine Parts Company (GPC) is an American automotive and industrial parts distributor based in Atlanta, Georgia. Established by brothers Carlyle and Malcolm Fraser in 1928, the company has approximately 60,000 employees. In addition to the United States, GPC has operated in Australasia, Belgium, Canada, France, Germany, Mexico, the Netherlands, Poland, and the United Kingdom. GPC's subsidiaries include industrial parts distributor Motion as well as NAPA Auto Parts, which primarily sells parts in North America.

== Company history ==
Genuine Parts Company (GPC) was founded by brothers Carlyle and Malcolm Fraser in Atlanta in 1928.

GPC's headquarters were located at Atlanta's Circle 75, in Cobb County, starting in 1979. Approximately 400 employees worked in the 115,000-square-foot space. In 2014, GPC announced plans to relocate its headquarters to Wildwood Office Park, next to an existing operational support facility.

William P. Stengel II is GPC's president and chief executive officer (CEO). He joined the company as GPC's first chief transformation officer in 2019, became president in 2021, and became chief operating officer in 2023. Stengel succeeded Paul Donahue, who became the CEO of GPC in 2016. Donahue succeeded Tom Gallagher, who initially continued as chairperson, until Donahue was elected by the board of directors to that role in 2019. Donahue transitioned to executive chairman in 2024. On February 17, 2026, the company announced its plan to split into two publicly traded companies.

GPC acquired UAP Inc. of Canada in 1998 and the Australian car parts supplier Exego Group in 2013. GPC and its four business units acquired nineteen companies in 2016. In 2017, GPC acquired a 35 percent stake in industrial distributor Inenco Group, as well as Alliance Automotive Group. GPC acquired Kaman Distribution Group (KDG), a provider of industrial solutions such as automation, conveyance, and fluid power, in 2022.

=== Motion Industries ===
Motion Industries began as Owen Richards Co., an industrial supply company, which Caldwell Marks and William Spencer III purchased in 1946 in Birmingham. They changed the name to Motion Industries, according to the founders, "because everything we do moves – we're in the bearing and transmission business."

Marks and Spencer merged Motion Industries with GPC in 1972. Motion Industries forms the Industrial Parts Group of Genuine Parts. According to Marks, Motion Industries was one of the first industrial distribution companies to establish a central distribution center and set up an electronic parts database.

In January 2021, Motion Industries announced an official rebrand as Motion. The rebranding also coincided with Motion's 75th anniversary.

==== Acquisitions ====
- Berry Bearing (1993),
- BC Bearing/US Bearings/Norcan (2010)
- Kaman Distribution Group (2022)

==== Legal ====
In 2012 Donald G. Maynor II, an employee, sued Motion Industries for age discrimination, alleging that the company fired him due to his age in violation of the West Virginia Human Rights Act. In 2015 Motion Industries sued Superior Derrick Services for $1 million due to non-payment of a portion of a contract for parts delivered between 2011 and 2014.

=== Former subsidiaries ===
In 1975, GPC acquired S.P. Richards, which was described by Industrial Distribution as "a distributor of general office products, technology products and accessories, office furniture, JanSan and safety supplies".

In 2018, GPC announced plans to merge the "workplace essentials distributor" S.P. Richards into Essendant, following a spin-off of S.P. Richards to become an independent company. The combined company would still be called Essendant (formerly United Stationers). The deal was never finalized, being rejected by Essendant, which accepted a buyout by Sycamore Partners instead. GPC sold S.P. Richards through a series of transactions in 2020, starting with the Canada division in January. The U.S. operations were sold to an investor group and the Supply Source Enterprise business, which included The Safety Zone and Impact Products operations, were sold to an affiliate of H.I.G. Capital. GPC continued with Motion and NAPA Auto Parts.

== Subsidiaries ==
GPC has two primary business segments: Motion, which focuses on industrial products, and the automotive brand NAPA Auto Parts.

=== Motion ===
Motion

Motion, known formally as Motion Industries, Inc., is an American distributor of industrial parts and industrial technology headquartered in Birmingham, Alabama. According to Industrial Distribution, Motion started as a distributor of bearings and industrial supplies, and expanded to offer products related to automation, conveyance, hydraulics, fluid power, and robotics. GPC acquired Motion in 1976. GPC's electrical products division, EIS Inc., merged with Motion in 2018, before being sold in October 2019. Based in Birmingham, Alabama, Motion has approximately 9,000 employees and 170,000 customers as of 2023.

James Howe is the president.

==== Operations ====
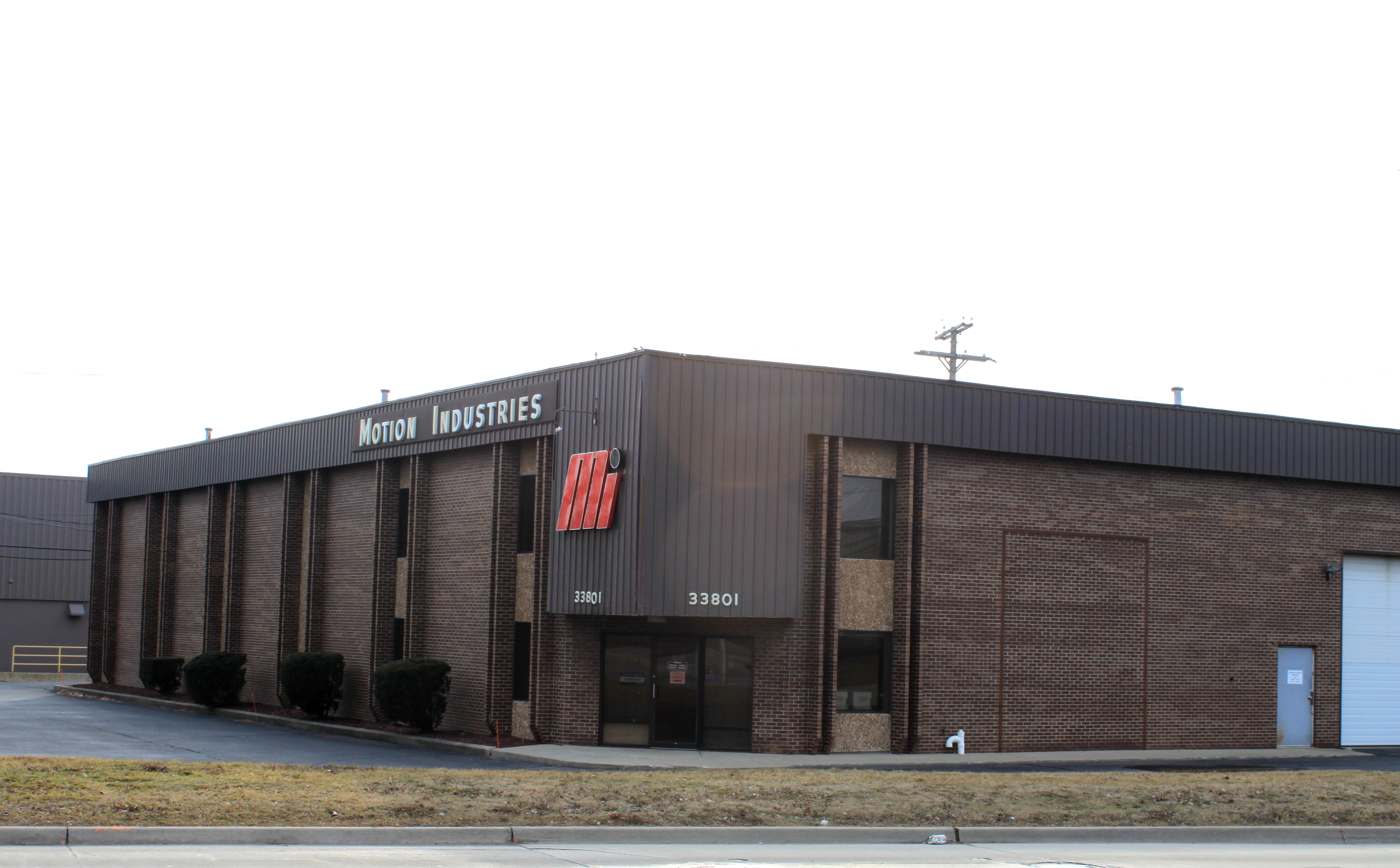
Motion Industries branch office Livonia, Michigan

Motion Industries is an industrial parts distributor for products including bearings; mechanical power transmission; electrical and industrial automation; hose, belting, and gaskets; hydraulic and pneumatics; process pumps; hydraulic and industrial hose; material handling; seals and accessories; and industrial/safety supplies. It also provides fabrication and repair services. The company's business units Motion Automation Intelligence (Motion Ai), Motion Conveyance Solutions and Motion Repair & Services offer related products and services.

As of 2023, Motion had annual sales of over $8 billion and 200,000 customers.

=== NAPA Auto Parts ===
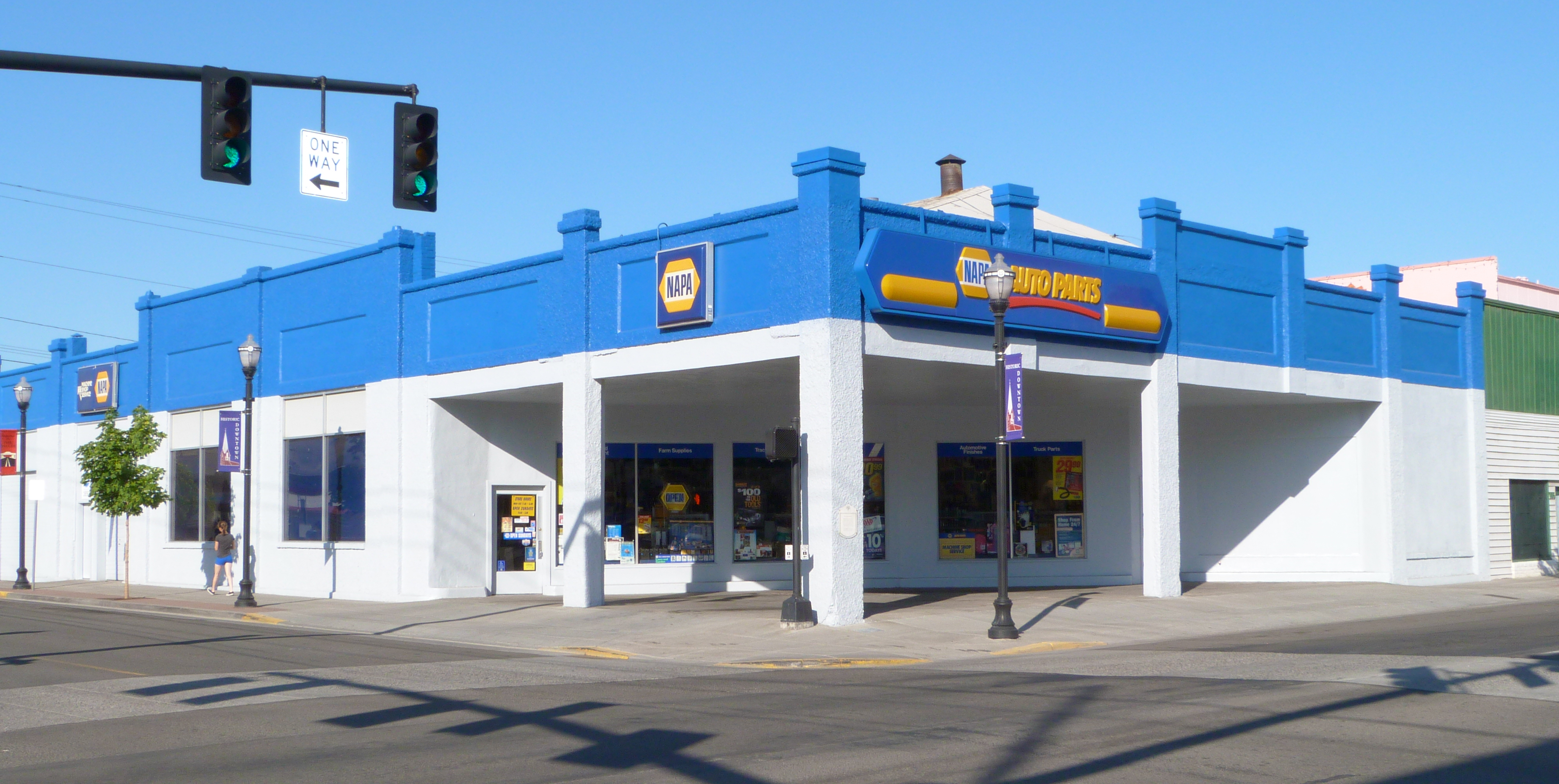
Among Genuine Parts Company's subsidiaries is NAPA Auto Parts; pictured is the exterior of a NAPA Auto Parts shop in the commercial historic district of The Dalles, Oregon, in 2014.

NAPA Auto Parts was established in 1925. Some NAPA Auto Parts stores are owned and operated by GPC, but most are independently owned and operated. There were approximately 6,000 NAPA Auto Parts stores in 2020.
