= Dennis Drayna =

American geneticist

- Born: 1952 (age 73–74)
- Education: University of Wisconsin, Harvard University (Ph.D. 1981)
- Known for: Studies of stuttering, human haemochromatosis, pitch, and taste
- Scientific career
- Fields: Genetics
- Workplaces: Howard Hughes Medical Institute, Genentech

Dennis T. Drayna (born 1952) is an American human geneticist known for his contributions to stuttering, human haemochromatosis, pitch, and taste. He is currently the Section Chief of Genetics of Communication Disorders at the U.S. National Institute for Deafness and Other Communication Disorders.

== Biography ==
Drayna graduated from the University of Wisconsin in 1976, and obtained a Ph.D. from Harvard University in 1981. He performed his post-doctoral training at the Howard Hughes Medical Institute in the lab of Raymond White, where he created the first full length genetic linkage map of the human X chromosome.

After completing his post-doctoral training, Drayna joined the scientific staff of Genentech in 1985, where, most notably, he cloned and sequenced cholesteryl ester transfer protein among other contributions.

In 1992, Drayna left Genentech to co-found Mercator Genetics, a bio-technology company focused on commercializing human genomic discoveries. Here, Drayna discovered the genetic basis of hereditary haemochromatosis. After Mercator Genetics was acquired by Progenitor in 1997, Drayna joined the Human Genome Project at the National Institutes of Health.

Since moving to the NIH, his research has focused across broad areas of human genetics, including pitch, taste, and stuttering. In 2010, Drayna uncovered the first genetic basis of stuttering in humans. Since the initial discovery, he has expanded the understanding of genetic and neurological causes of human stuttering, including discovering additional genetic correlates of stuttering and creating 'knock-out' stuttering mice. Drayna has also investigated the genetic underpinnings of complex taste traits, including PTC, and also menthol cigarettes.

After 22 years of research at the National Institute on Deafness and Other Communication Disorders, Drayna retired in June 2019. He is currently a member of the board of directors of The Stuttering Foundation of America, and a member of the faculty of the program in neuroscience and cognitive science at the University of Maryland.
