= Abram P. Haring =

American Civil War Medal of Honor recipient

Abram Pye Haring
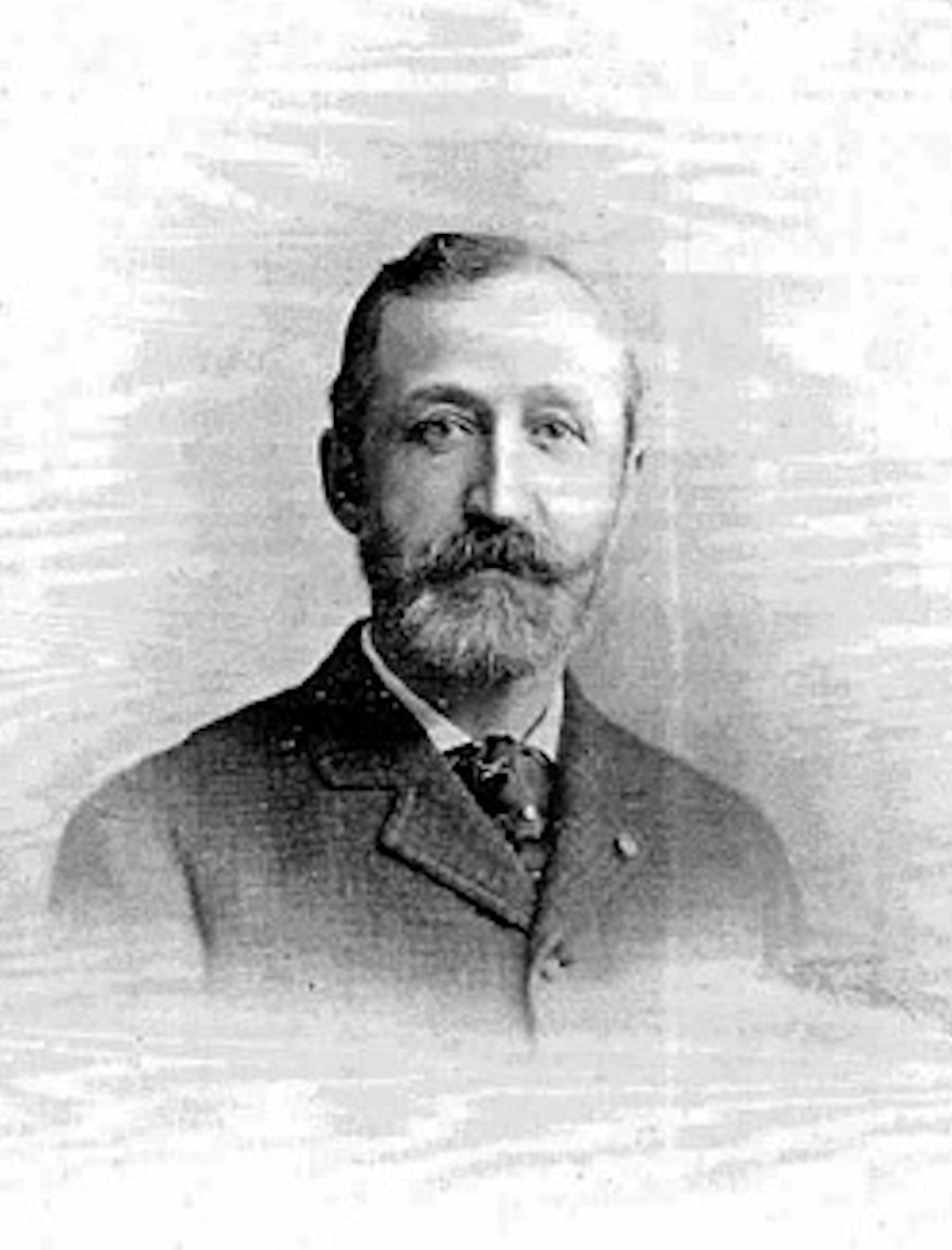
- Haring in c. 191
- Born: November 15, 1840; Cornwall on Hudson, New York
- Died: February 22, 1915 (aged 74)
- Burial place: New York, New York
- Military career
- Allegiance: United States
- Branch: United States Army
- Rank: First Lieutenant
- Units: (New York (state)) Company G, 132nd New York Volunteer Infantry Regiment
- Conflicts: American Civil War
- Awards: Medal of Honor

Abram Pye Haring (November 15, 1840 – February 22, 1915) was an American soldier who fought in the American Civil War. Haring received his country's highest award for bravery during combat, the Medal of Honor. Haring's medal was won for his actions at Bachelor's Creek in North Carolina. Haring and the eleven men under his command resisted an overwhelming attack from Confederate forces on February 1, 1864. He was honored with the award on June 28, 1890.

Haring was born in Cornwall-on-Hudson, New York, and entered service in New York City, where he was later buried.

DETAILS

- RANK: FIRST LIEUTENANT
- CONFLICT/ERA: U.S. CIVIL WAR
- UNIT/COMMAND:COMPANY G,132D NEW YORK INFANTRY
- MILITARY SERVICE BRANCH: U.S. ARMY
- MEDAL OF HONOR ACTION DATE: FEBRUARY 1, 1864
- MEDAL OF HONOR ACTION PLACE: BACHELOR'S CREEK, NORTH CAROLINA, USA

== Medal of Honor citation ==
The President of the United States of America, in the name of Congress, takes pleasure in presenting the Medal of Honor to First Lieutenant (Infantry) Abram Pye Haring, United States Army, for extraordinary heroism on 1 February 1864, while serving with Company G, 132d New York Infantry, in action at Bachelor's Creek, North Carolina. With a command of 11 men, on picket, First Lieutenant Haring resisted the attack of an overwhelming force of the enemy.

== See also ==
- Jackson's Valley Campaign
- Second Battle of Deep Bottom
- Siege of Petersburg
