= Louis Pierre Ledoux =

American anthropologist

- Born: August 1, 1912; Cornwall-on-Hudson, New York, US
- Died: March 17, 2001 (aged 88); Cornwall-on-Hudson, New York, US
- Education: Harvard University
- Occupations: businessman, anthropologist
- Known for: Studies of the Murik people from the lower eastern Sepik River of Papua New Guinea
- Spouse: Joan F.
- Children: 2

Louis Pierre Ledoux (August 1, 1912 – March 17, 2001) was an American anthropologist. He is notable for his New Guinea expedition in early 1936, where he studied the Murik people, who were located the north coast of Papua New Guinea, west of the mouth of the Sepik River.

== Early life and education ==
Louis Pierre Ledoux, one of two children, was born on August 1, 1912, in Cornwall-on-Hudson, New York, the son of Louis Verdon Ledoux, an American poet and author, and Jean Logan. He had one sister, Renee Ledoux Sands.

He graduated from Gunnery School in Washington, Connecticut, and earned his bachelor's degree from Harvard University in 1935. Ledoux was mentored by American cultural anthropologist Margaret Mead, who guided and advised Ledoux on the conducting anthropological research in New Guinea and what was eventually to be known as the Louis Pierre Ledoux’s Papua New Guinea Collection.

== Personal life ==
Ledoux was married to Joan F. Ledoux with whom he had two children: daughter Jeanne Nicole Ledoux, and son Louis Andre Ledoux.

== Career and later life ==
He was president of the family company, Ledoux and Co., a metallurgical laboratory.

After Ledoux graduated from Harvard University, he sought out guidance from his mentor Margaret Mead on how to prepare himself for his expedition to New Guinea. Mead who was already familiar with the terrain in New Guinea, and provided Ledoux with her own equipment list in order to help Ledoux on his expedition. Ledoux's expedition in New Guinea lasted a full year (1936–1937). All the research Ledoux conducted in New Guinea was never published. Ledoux returned in 1937 to join the family business and all his research from his expedition, including side notes and comments made by his mentor Margaret Mead, was stored away. It was not until 85 years later, that his collection of artifacts, photographs, field notes, and letters were acquired for auction in 2021.

He died on March 17, 2001, in Cornwall-on-Hudson, New York and is buried in Woodlawn Cemetery.
