= Cornwall Central School District =

School district in the U.S. state of New York

Coordinates: 41°26′33″N 74°00′50″W

Location
- Cornwall on Hudson, NY United States

District information
- Type: Public
- Motto: "Striving for Excellence Every Day"
- Grades: K-12
- Established: late 1950s
- Superintendent: Terry J. Dade
- Budget: $50.9 million

Students and staff
- Students: 3,231
- Teachers: 250
- Staff: 180
- Colors: Green and white

Other information
- Website: http://www.cornwallschools.com

The Cornwall Central School District is based in Cornwall-on-Hudson, New York, and provides public education to the children of that village, the Town of Cornwall and portions of the neighboring towns of New Windsor and Woodbury. It operates three elementary schools, a middle school, high school and a small main office building in downtown Cornwall on Hudson.

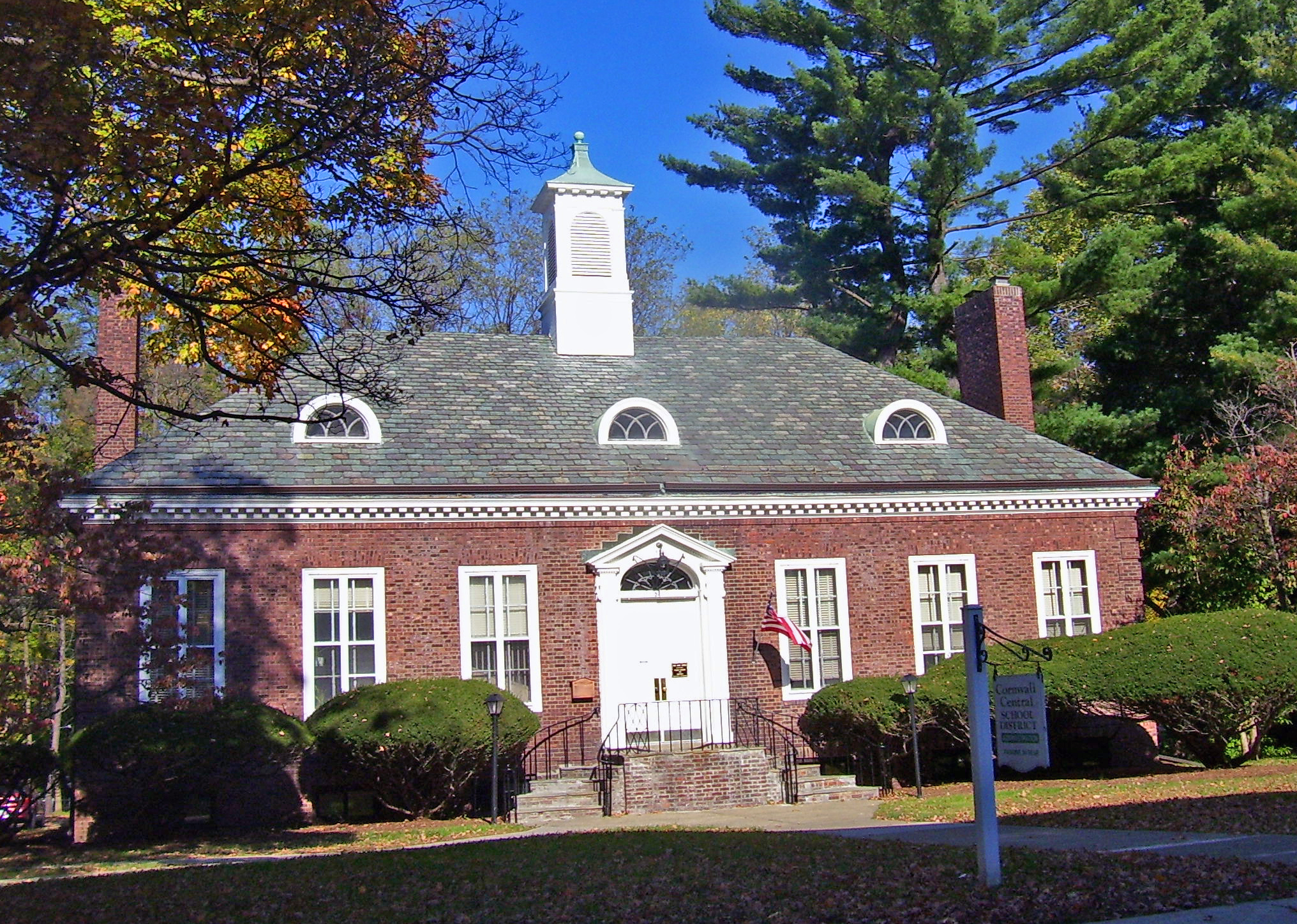
District offices.

It was created from the merger of the Cornwall on Hudson and Cornwall school districts in the mid-1950s. The buildings used by both districts are still in use today. The others have been built since then. It is governed by a seven-member elected school board and is financed by property taxes levied within the district.

== Schools ==
Cornwall has three elementary schools, all educating students from kindergarten through fourth grade. The former Cornwall on Hudson main school building, on NY 218 in the center of the village, is now Cornwall-on-Hudson Elementary School. Cornwall's school, located on Willow Avenue outside downtown Cornwall near the hamlet of Firthcliffe, is now Willow Avenue Elementary School after educating sixth and seventh graders for the later 20th century. A third school, known formally as Cornwall Elementary School, is referred to within the district as Lee Road Elementary School for the street it is located on. It was built in 1968 due west of what is now Cornwall Central Middle School, located along Main Street just south of Route 218 outside the village.

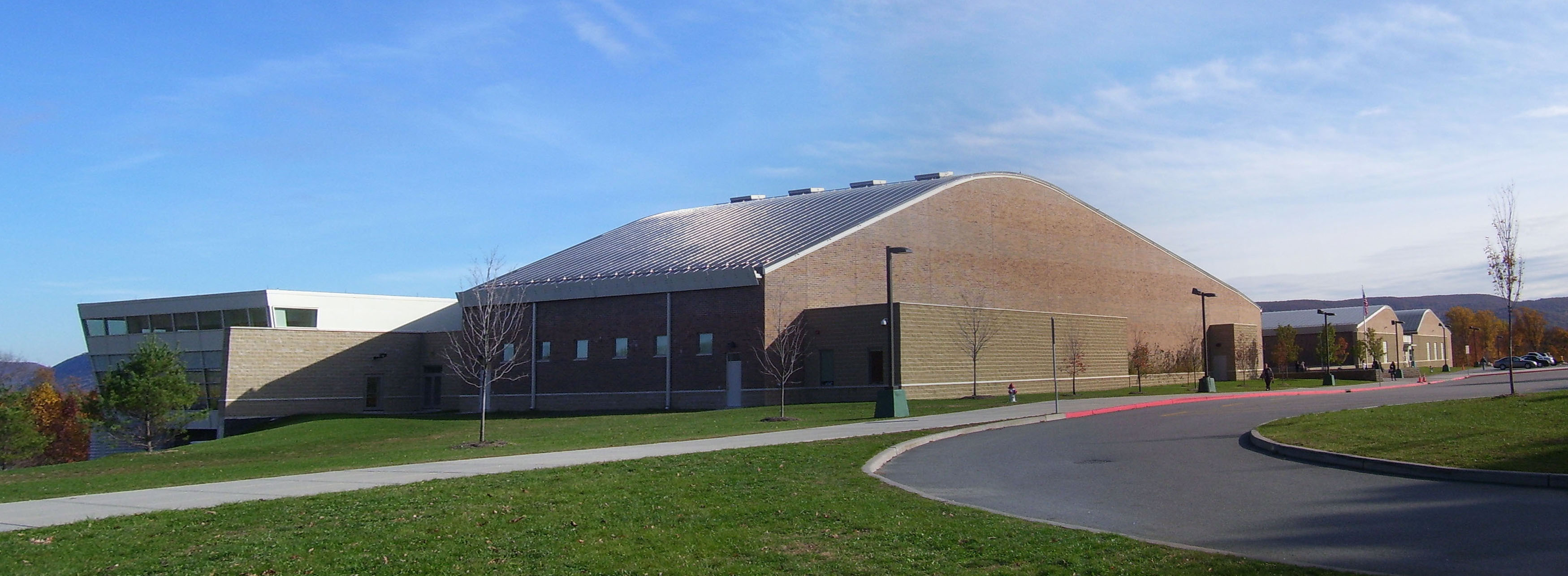
New high school

That building was built in 1957 as the high school to handle the district's merger. During that time, it held grades 8 through 12. By the end of the century, growing population due to increased development in the district and larger families led to overcrowding, and after much contention a new Cornwall Central High School was built in the western section of the district, along NY 94. It won some architectural awards when it opened in 2003. The roofline of the "gym, pool and auditorium mimics the shape of distant hills" and the corridors include a "train track" rhythm to mimic the nostalgia for railways in the region. With its opening, the district reorganized the grades so that fifth graders and eighth graders attend the middle school.
