= Journal of Supply Chain Management =

- Discipline: Supply chain management
- Language: English
- Edited by: Wendy Tate; Andreas Wieland; Tingting Yan

Publication details
- Former names: Journal of Purchasing, Journal of Purchasing and Materials Management, International Journal of Purchasing and Materials Management
- History: 1965–present
- Publisher: Wiley-Blackwell
- Frequency: Quarterly
- Impact factor: 10.6 (2022)

Standard abbreviations
- ISO 4: J. Supply Chain Manag.

Indexing
- ISSN: 1523-2409 (print); 1745-493X (web)
- LCCN: 99111604
- OCLC no.: 60455446

Links
- Journal homepage; Online access; Online archive

The Journal of Supply Chain Management is a quarterly peer-reviewed academic journal that was established in 1965. The journal covers supply chain management, operations management, marketing, strategic management, and social network analysis. It is published by Wiley-Blackwell and the editors-in-chief are Wendy L. Tate (University of Tennessee, Knoxville), Andreas Wieland (Copenhagen Business School), and Tingting Yan (Texas Tech University).

== History ==
The journal was established in 1965 as the Journal of Purchasing. It was renamed Journal of Purchasing and Materials Management in 1974, then renamed International Journal of Purchasing and Materials Management in 1991, obtaining its current name in 1999.

=== Editors-in-chief ===
The following persons are or have been editor-in-chief:

- Wendy Tate, co-editor-in-chief, since 2022
- Andreas Wieland, co-editor-in-chief, since 2022
- Tingting Yan, co-editor-in-chief, since 2021
- Mark Pagell, 2016–2022
- David Cantor, 2020–2021
- Barbara B. Flynn, 2016–2021
- Brian Fugate, 2016–2020
- Craig Carter, 2007–2016
- Lisa Ellram, 2007–2016
- Alvin J. Williams, 2002–2007
- Phillip Carter, 1997–2001
- Donald W. Dobler, 1980–1996
- Paul Farrel, 1975–1979
- Harold E. Fearon, 1965–1974

== Reception ==
The journal is rated class 4 ("top journals in their field", 4* being the highest score) in the Chartered Association of Business Schools' 2021 Academic Journal Guide and class "A" (middle class of three) in the 2023 BWL Meta Rating. It is also one of four empirical journals used by the SCM Journal List to rank universities' supply chain management research output. According to the Journal Citation Reports, its 2022 impact factor is 10.6.

== Abstracting and indexing ==
The journal is abstracted and indexed in:

- Current Contents/Social and Behavioral Sciences
- EBSCO databases
- Inspec
- ProQuest databases
- Scopus
- Social Sciences Citation Index

== Most cited articles ==
According to the Science Citation Index Expanded, the following three articles have been cited most often (>450 times):

1. Pagell, Mark; Wu, Zhaohui (2009). "Building a More Complete Theory of Sustainable Supply Chain Management Using Case Studies of 10 Exemplars". Journal of Supply Chain Management. 45 (2): 37–56. doi:10.1111/j.1745-493X.2009.03162.x.
2. Williamson, Oliver E. (2008). "Outsourcing: Transaction Cost Economics and Supply Chain Management". The Journal of Supply Chain Management. 44 (2): 5–16. doi:10.1111/j.1745-493X.2008.00051.x.
3. Brandon-Jones, Emma; Squire, Brian; Autry, Chad W.; Petersen, Kenneth J. (2014). "A Contingent Resource-Based Perspective of Supply Chain Resilience and Robustness" (PDF). Journal of Supply Chain Management. 50 (3): 55–73. doi:10.1111/jscm.12050.

== See also ==
- Supply Chain Management
- Supply Chain Management Review
