= Harriet Josephine Terry =

American sorority founder (1885–1967)

- Born: February 4, 1885; Cornwall-on-Hudson, New York, U.S.
- Died: August 15, 1967 (aged 82); Washington, D.C., U.S.
- Occupations: founder of Alpha Kappa Alpha sorority, Incorporated; English and History teacher

Harriet Josephine Terry (February 4, 1885 - August 15, 1967) was one of the sophomores founders of 1908 of Alpha Kappa Alpha sorority, the first sorority founded by African-American women.

Terry was foremost an educator, for more than 30 years at the college level. She inspired new generations of teachers while teaching English at Alabama A&M University for 37 years. The university named a women's residence hall in Terry's honor. The profession of teaching at all levels was one of the most prestigious in the African-American community. Education was considered essential for continued progress, and the best students were encouraged to go into teaching.

Terry also was active with professional associations, the local chapters of Alpha Kappa Alpha, and the National Women's Club.

== Early life ==
Harriet Terry graduated from Cornwall-on-Hudson High School, in New York in spring 1906. She entered Howard University later that year. It was the top historically black college in the nation, established after the American Civil War. At the time only 1/3 of 1% of African Americans and only 5% of whites of eligible age attended any college.

== Founding of Alpha Kappa Alpha ==
Nine women founded Alpha Kappa Alpha Sorority on January 15, 1908. Terry was a sophomore who also expressed interest. Because of excellent grades, she and several others were accepted as "honor sophomores", without initiation. On October 30, 1908, Terry was elected treasurer of the sorority.

The first initiation ceremony took place on February 11, 1909. In fall 1909, Terry started as elected president of the chapter. She wrote the Alpha Kappa Alpha initiation hymn, "Hail Alpha Kappa Alpha Dear."

Harriet Terry was also elected Secretary for the Class of 1910 at Howard University. She graduated with a Bachelor of Arts degree in liberal arts in May 1910, with concentrations in Latin, English, French, German, political science, pedagogy, history, and chemistry.

== Career and civic life ==
After graduation, Terry became chairman of English and History at Gloucester High School in Capahosic, Virginia. During World War I, she returned to Washington to work at the Bureau of Engraving and Printing.

After the war, Terry started teaching English at Alabama Agricultural & Mechanical College, devoted to creating new educators. (It is now Alabama A&M University). She stayed with the university for more than 35 years, inspiring generations. In addition to teaching at the main campus, she trained public school teachers through Alabama A&M extension courses in Athens, Alabama and other parts of Limestone County, Alabama. Creating new teachers was critical. A study in 1900 noted that twice as many African-American teachers were needed to reach prospective students and achieve parity with white teachers.

Terry became a member of the National Women's Clubs, and also served with professional groups. She was a charter member of Chapel of the Holy Cross Episcopal Church in Normal, Alabama.

During these years, Terry continued to be involved with Alpha Kappa Alpha. In 1949, she established the Epsilon Gamma Omega alumnae chapter in Normal, Alabama, and led it as president.

In 1959, Terry retired from teaching after having worked at Alabama A&M University for nearly 40 years. She returned to Washington, D.C., and joined the Xi Omega chapter of ΑΚΑ.

Terry enjoyed discussions about literature, other good conversation, books, and movies with students and friends. She died on August 15, 1967.

== Honors ==
Alabama A&M University named Terry Hall, a women's residence hall, in honor of Harriet Terry, in recognition of her many contributions to the college.
