= Malcolm Fraser (philanthropist) =

American philanthropist and businessman

- Born: Malcolm Hough Fraser; 1903; Cornwall-on-Hudson, New York, U.S.
- Died: February 17, 1994 (aged 90–91); Memphis, Tennessee, U.S.
- Education: University of Pittsburgh
- Known for: Founding the Genuine Parts Company and the Stuttering Foundation of America

Malcolm Hough Fraser (1903–1994) was an American businessman. He founded the Genuine Parts Company with his brother in 1928 and the Stuttering Foundation of America in 1947, giving the latter most of its $10 million endowment. He was the recipient of the fourth annual National Council on Communicative Disorders Distinguished Service Award in 1984.

== Biography ==
Malcolm Fraser was born in Cornwall-on-Hudson, New York, in 1903, and stuttered severely from an early age. He had his first formal speech therapy session with Dr. Frederick Martin, Superintendent of Speech Correction for the New York City Schools, who succeeded in helping him become fluent in the clinic. However, when instructed to speak on stage in a presentation to a group of eminent physicians, he "couldn't utter a single syllable"; he would remember that experience for many years, "even at age 90". Subsequently, he attended Hamilton College for two years, before graduating from the University of Pittsburgh in 1924.

In 1928, Fraser and his older brother, Carlyle, founded the Genuine Parts Company in Atlanta. The former became the president of the company's Memphis warehouse, trained many of the employees who now manage the company, and would remain a director of the company until his death. As of 2000, the company was the "industry leading distributor of automotive, industrial, office and electrical/electronic replacement parts".

In 1947, Fraser, at age 44, set up the Stuttering Foundation of America and made his first donation to the foundation of US$2,500, a significant amount at the time. He subsequently contacted Charles Van Riper, an expert in the field, who would eventually receive research grants from the foundation and work on various projects including a study on the effect of avoidance on stuttering, and a conference of experts that attempted to reach some agreement on general guidelines for a comprehensive program on stuttering. During the early years of the foundation, Fraser's wife, Charlotte, was its entire staff. Fraser would eventually give the foundation most of its US$10 million endowment, and write Self-Therapy for the Stutterer, first published in 1978, a book that has been called a classic, and has been translated into eight languages.

In 1984, Fraser received the fourth annual National Council on Communicative Disorders Distinguished Service Award. The council, composed of 32 United States organizations, recognized the foundation's efforts in adding to stutterers', parents', clinicians', and the public's awareness and ability to deal constructively with stuttering. In 1989, Hamilton College presented him with the honorary degree of Doctor of Humane Letters for his outstanding work on behalf of those who stutter.

Fraser died of congestive heart failure on February 17, 1994, at the age of 91, at his home in Memphis. In 1997, he was honored posthumously with the Charles Van Riper Award, presented by James Earl Jones at the 16th Annual National Council on Communicative Disorders Awards Ceremony, for his "outstanding commitment to people who stutter".

== See also ==
- List of stutterers
