= Supply Chain Management (journal) =

Bimonthly academic journal

- Discipline: Business and management
- Language: English
- Edited by: Andrew Fearne

Publication details
- Publisher: Emerald Group Publishing
- Frequency: Bimonthly
- Impact factor: 4.725 (2019)

Standard abbreviations
- ISO 4: Supply Chain Manag.

Indexing
- ISSN: 1359-8546

Links
- Journal homepage

Supply Chain Management is a bimonthly peer-reviewed academic journal covering issues in supply chain management, including contractual relationships, data interchange and vertical integration, efficient consumer response, investment in emerging economies, just in time procedures, logistics, organizational behaviour, and risk management. It is published by Emerald Group Publishing and the editor-in-chief is Andrew Fearne (Kent Business School). The journal publishes research papers, research notes, case studies, insights from industry, and doctoral papers. The journal is abstracted and indexed in the Social Sciences Citation Index and Scopus. According to the Journal Citation Reports, the journal has a 2012 impact factor of 1.684.
