= William Hamilton Gibson =

American illustrator, author and naturalist (1850–1896)

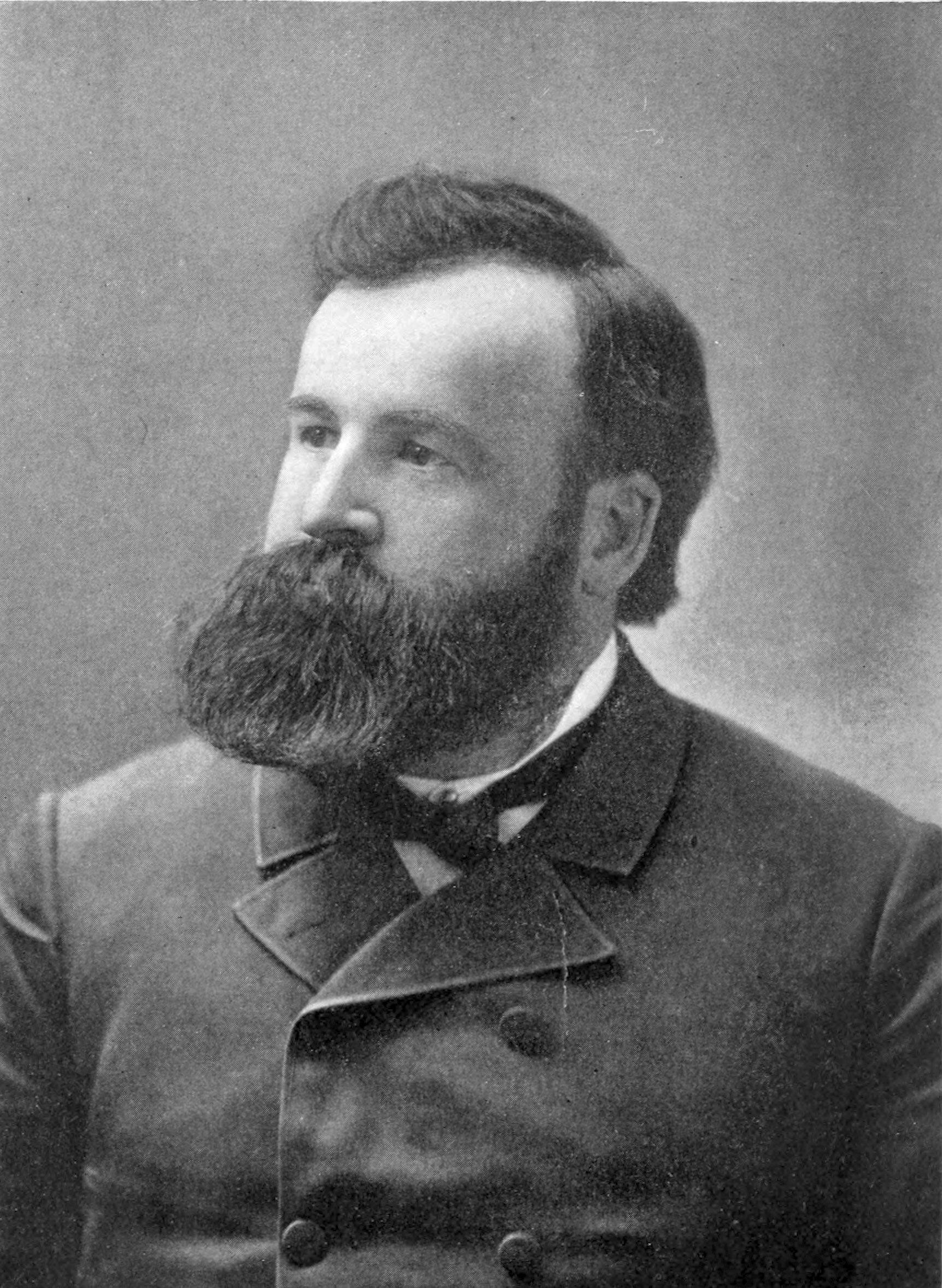
- Born: October 5, 1850; Sandy Hook, Connecticut
- Died: July 16, 1896 (aged 45); Washington, Connecticut
- Known for: drawings
- Scientific career
- Fields: Natural history
- Author abbrev. (botany): W.H.Gibson

William Hamilton Gibson (October 5, 1850 – July 16, 1896) was an American illustrator, author and naturalist.

== Early Life ==
Gibson was born in Sandy Hook, Connecticut, of an old, distinguished New England family; one of his great-great-grandfathers was the jurist Richard Dana (1699–1772), who was the great-grandfather of the famous author Richard Henry Dana Jr. His parents were Edmund Trobridge Hastings and Elizabeth Charlotte (Sanford) Gibson.

== Education and Career ==
Gibson was educated at The Gunnery, Washington, Connecticut, and began studying at the Brooklyn Polytechnic Institute. The financial failure and in 1868 the death of Gibson's father, a New York broker, put an end to his studies in the Brooklyn Polytechnic Institute and made it necessary for him to earn his own living. From the life insurance business, in Brooklyn, he soon turned to the study of natural history and illustration, he had sketched flowers and insects when he was only eight years old, had long been interested in botany and entomology, and had acquired great skill in making faux flowers. His first drawings, of a technical character, were published in 1870.

He became an expert illustrator and an able wood-engraver, while he also drew on stone with success. He drew for The American Agriculturist, Hearth and Home, and Appletons American Cyclopaedia; for The Youth's Companion and St Nicholas; and then for various Harper publications, especially Harper's Monthly magazine, where his illustrations first gained popularity.

He was an excellent photographer, and his drawings had a nearly photographic and almost microscopic accuracy of detail which slightly lessened their artistic value, as a poetic and sometimes humorous quality somewhat detracted from their scientific worth. Gibson was perfectly at home in black-and-white, but rarely (and feebly) used colors. He was a popular writer and lecturer on natural history.

== Personal Life ==
In 1873 he married Emma Ludlow, daughter of Charles Augustus Ludlow Blanchard.

== Death ==
He died of apoplexy, brought on by overwork at Washington, Connecticut, where he had had a summer studio, and where in a great boulder is inset a relief portrait of him by H. K. Bush-Brown.

== Works ==
Gibson authored and illustrated many books.

=== As illustrator ===
- S. A. Drake's In the Heart of the White Mountains
- C. D. Warner's New South
- E. P. Roe's Nature's Serial Story

=== As illustrator and author ===
- The Complete American Trapper (1876; revised, 1880, as Camp Life in the Woods)
- Pastoral Days: or, Memories of a New England Year (1880)
- Highways and Byways (1882)
- Happy Hunting Grounds (1886)
- Strolls by Starlight and Sunshine (1890)
- Sharp Eyes: a Rambler's Calendar (1891)
- Our Edible Mushrooms and Toadstools (1895)
- Eye Spy: Afield with Nature among Flowers and Animate Things (1897)
- My Studio Neighbours (1898).

Resurgam, lithographed by L. Prang & Co. from a painting by W. Hamilton Gibson, 1884
