= Stuttering Foundation of America =

American nonprofit organization

The Stuttering Foundation of America
- Formation: 1947; 79 years ago
- Founder: Malcolm Fraser
- Type: NGO
- Legal status: 501(c)(3) organization
- Purpose: Stuttering therapy
- Headquarters: Memphis, Tennessee, U.S.
- Coordinates: 35.082155°N 89.899131°W
- Region served: United States
- President: Jane Fraser
- Website: stutteringhelp.org

The Stuttering Foundation of America is a nonprofit charitable organization working toward the prevention and improved treatment of stuttering. A 501(c)(3) nonprofit organization, The Stuttering Foundation was established by Malcolm Fraser in 1947 in Memphis, Tennessee. The Stuttering Foundation provides a toll-free helpline, free printed and online resources including books, pamphlets, videos, posters, referral services, support and information for people who stutter and their families, and research into the causes of stuttering.

Malcolm Fraser's daughter, Jane Fraser, is president of the Foundation.

== History ==
In 1947, Malcolm Fraser, a man from Memphis, Tennessee, knew about stuttering from personal, often painful experience. He met with Dr. Charles Van Riper, a prominent stuttering speech therapist at the time, to discuss founding a nonprofit charitable organization. The organization Fraser founded became today's Stuttering Foundation of America. Its goal was to provide the best and most up-to-date information and help available for the prevention of stuttering in young children and the most effective treatment available for teenagers and adults.

=== Founder ===
Malcolm Fraser was a person who stuttered. His introduction to stuttering corrective procedures first came at the age of fifteen under the direction of Frederick Martin, M.D., who at that time was Superintendent of Speech Correction for the New York City schools. A few years later, he worked with J. Stanley Smith, L.L.D., a stutterer and philanthropist, who founded the Kingsley Clubs in Philadelphia and New York that were named after the English author Charles Kingsley, who also stuttered.

In 1928, Fraser joined his brother Carlyle, who founded the NAPA Genuine Parts Company that year in Atlanta, Georgia. In 1947, Fraser founded the Stuttering Foundation of America. In subsequent years, he added $20 million to the endowment.

== Mission ==
=== Research ===
Neuroimaging studies for the potential to understand brain-behavior relationships in complex behaviors such as speech and language. The Foundation was involved in projects by Dr. Dennis Drayna of the National Institute on Deafness and other Communicative Disorders searching for genetic markers.

=== Education ===
The Foundation discusses questions and provides information surrounding stuttering. This includes:

- Technologies for more interactive media.
- Symposia
- Intensive training workshops for speech language pathologists. These programs are co-sponsored by leading universities throughout the U.S. and abroad.
- Books, DVDs, and brochures

== Public awareness ==
Press releases have resulted in stories in print and segments on stuttering in the broadcast media, including CBS This Morning, The Today Show, CNN, NPR, and AP wire stories.

The Foundation's toll-free line is accessed by more than 20,000 callers each year.

=== Global outreach ===
In an alliance to help children who stutter through research, treatment and training programs, the Stuttering Foundation and the Michael Palin Centre for Stammering Children joined forces in 2006. The Michael Palin Centre is based in London.

=== Honors and awards ===
In 1978, American Speech-Language-Hearing Association gave a Distinguished Service Award to the Foundation. The NCCD, a council of 32 national organizations, recognized the Foundation's efforts in "adding to stutterers, parents, clinicians, and the public's awareness and ability to deal constructively with stuttering."
