= Supply & Demand Chain Executive =

- Editor: Marina Mayer
- Categories: Supply Chain, Logistics
- Frequency: Digital
- Circulation: 109,000
- First issue: August 2000
- Company: AC Business Media
- Country: United States
- Based in: Fort Atkinson, Wisconsin
- Language: English
- ISSN: 1548-3142

Supply & Demand Chain Executive is a digital publication that covers the entire global supply chain, focusing on trucking, warehousing, packaging, procurement, risk management, professional development and related topics.

== Overview ==
This digital-only publication reaches executives in corporate procurement, purchasing, logistics and operations management in manufacturing and non-manufacturing industries with its twice-weekly e-newsletter.

== Events ==
Supply & Demand Chain Executive owns and operates the Women in Supply Chain Forum, a networking and educational forum tailored to men and women in executive-level positions to expand their professional network and enhance their businesses through discussion panels.

Supply & Demand Chain Executive also owns and operates the SCN Summit, a virtual event aimed at educating logistics professionals on critical issues impacting the supply chain industry.
