= Industrial Distribution =

- Type: website magazine
- Format: Paper and online magazine
- Owner: Advantage Business Media
- Editor: Anna K. Wells
- Founded: 1911
- Language: English
- Headquarters: Madison, Wisconsin
- Circulation: 39,000
- ISSN: 0019-8153
- Website: Industrial Distribution

Industrial Distribution is a website owned by Advantage Business Media. The site provides, news, feature, video, and product content geared toward distributors, wholesalers, and re-sellers of products used in the industrial manufacturing MRO (maintain, repair, overhaul) marketplace.

The website's editor is Anna K. Wells, and the site's editorial director is Jeff Reinke. ID's editorial offices are located at Advantage Business Media's branch in Madison, Wisconsin.

It was founded 1911 as Mill Supplies and changed its name in the 1930s to better reflect the changing industrial marketplace. In its current form, Industrial Distribution publishes daily breaking news about the distribution and supplier marketplace. Industrial Distribution also offers the Mid-Week Report, a weekly e-newsletter that provides news, editorial, and product content similar to what's found on the website. Common topics of news and editorial pieces include product knowledge, business management, salesmanship, customer service, understanding customers' critical issues and how they're impacting purchasing decisions, market trends impacting supply and demand, inventory management, integrating new technology to improve operational efficiency, order fulfillment speed, and pricing pressures.

Industrial Distribution also compiles the 50 biggest distributors by sales volume with the acclaimed "Big 50" list. The list includes the companies' products, location, number of employees and annual sales.

The magazine was closed by its publisher, Reed Business Information, as of 6 January 2010. The Industrial Distribution website was re-launched by Advantage Business Media in April 2010.
