= Enoch Crosby =

American spy

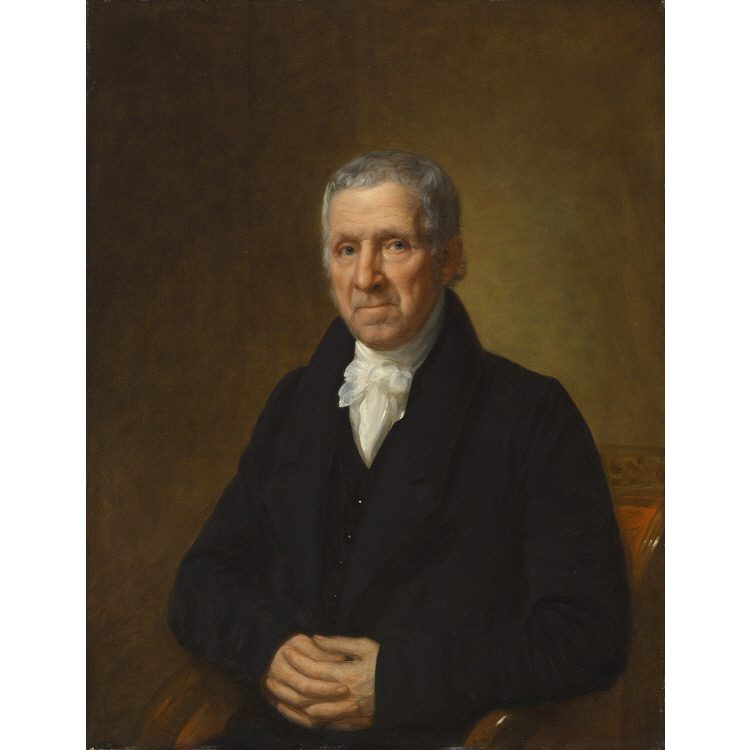
- Born: January 4, 1750; Harwich, Massachusetts
- Died: June 26, 1835 (aged 85); Putnam County, New York
- Burial place: Gilead Cemetery, Carmel, New York
- Occupations: Shoemaker, spy, soldier
- Espionage activity
- Allegiance: United States
- Service branch: Continental Army
- Service years: 1775–1780
- Operations: Invasion of Quebec (1775)

Enoch Crosby (1750–1835) was an American spy and soldier during the American Revolution. His life may have been the basis for the character Harvey Birch in James Fenimore Cooper's novel The Spy.

== Early life ==
Crosby was born in Harwich, Massachusetts, on January 4, 1750, the son of Thomas and Elizabeth Crosby. His family moved to what is now Putnam County, New York, when Crosby was only an infant. The family was poor, and by 1766, Crosby set out from home to find a career. He became an apprentice shoemaker in Kent, New York, and continued in the apprenticeship until it was completed in 1771, on his 21st birthday.

When the American Revolutionary War began, he was in Danbury, Connecticut, and immediately enlisted as a soldier.

== Revolutionary War ==
Crosby enlisted with a Connecticut regiment in the first weeks of the war. His unit became part of the invasion of Canada by the Continental Army in 1775. After the capture of Montreal, his enlistment expired and he returned to Danbury to continue his career as a shoemaker.

Nearby Westchester County, New York, was then the Neutral Ground between the British forces controlling New York City in the south and colonial forces in the north. In addition to regular armies, the county was host to vigilante gangs that claimed to support a side in the conflict to justify their pillage.

By September 1776, Crosby had left behind his shoemaking to return to the Continental Army and made his way to the camp at White Plains, in Westchester County. On the way, as a result of misunderstanding, Crosby was invited to join a meeting of Loyalist locals, who were intending to support the British efforts in the area. He managed to deliver the information that he learned to John Jay, a member of the local Committee of Safety, and at Jay and Crosby's direction, the group of Loyalists was arrested.

He was recruited to a full-time spy by Jay, and to gain entry into Loyalist and British circles, he adopted the identity of a spy employed by the British General Howe. By doing so, he became an object of hatred for many of his friends and family. Crosby requested that if he died, the Committee of Safety would clear his name for having supported the British, and it also gave him a special pass that was to be used in an emergency if he was captured by American forces.

Crosby served as a spy in Westchester County, farther north near Lake Champlain, and in other areas. He followed the same pattern of infiltration, capture, and escape at least four times. The intelligence that he provided was used both to capture Loyalists and to undermine local support for the British, and on at least one occasion, it proved useful to the commander of the Continental Army, George Washington.

Crosby was repeatedly captured by Americans who believed him to be a Loyalist but always escaped. To protect his identity, on one occasion he was put up for a mock trial at the Van Wyck House, after which he was quietly allowed to escape and carry on with his work.

Following the War, Crosby and his brother purchased a farm, and he lived on that land until his death.

== Legacy ==
As reported in his obituary in the Cabinet Newspaper (Schenectady, New York), July 8, 1835, p. 3, Crosby's life was the basis for the character Harvey Birch in The Spy, a novel that was published in 1821 and written by the American writer James Fenimore Cooper. Cooper may have heard of Crosby's story from John Jay although Jay apparently did not reveal Crosby's name for fear of retribution from the spy's enemies.

== See also ==
- Intelligence in the American Revolutionary War
- Intelligence operations in the American Revolutionary War
