= J. Y. Dykman Flour and Feed Store =

Historic commercial building in New York, United States

- U.S. National Register of Historic Places
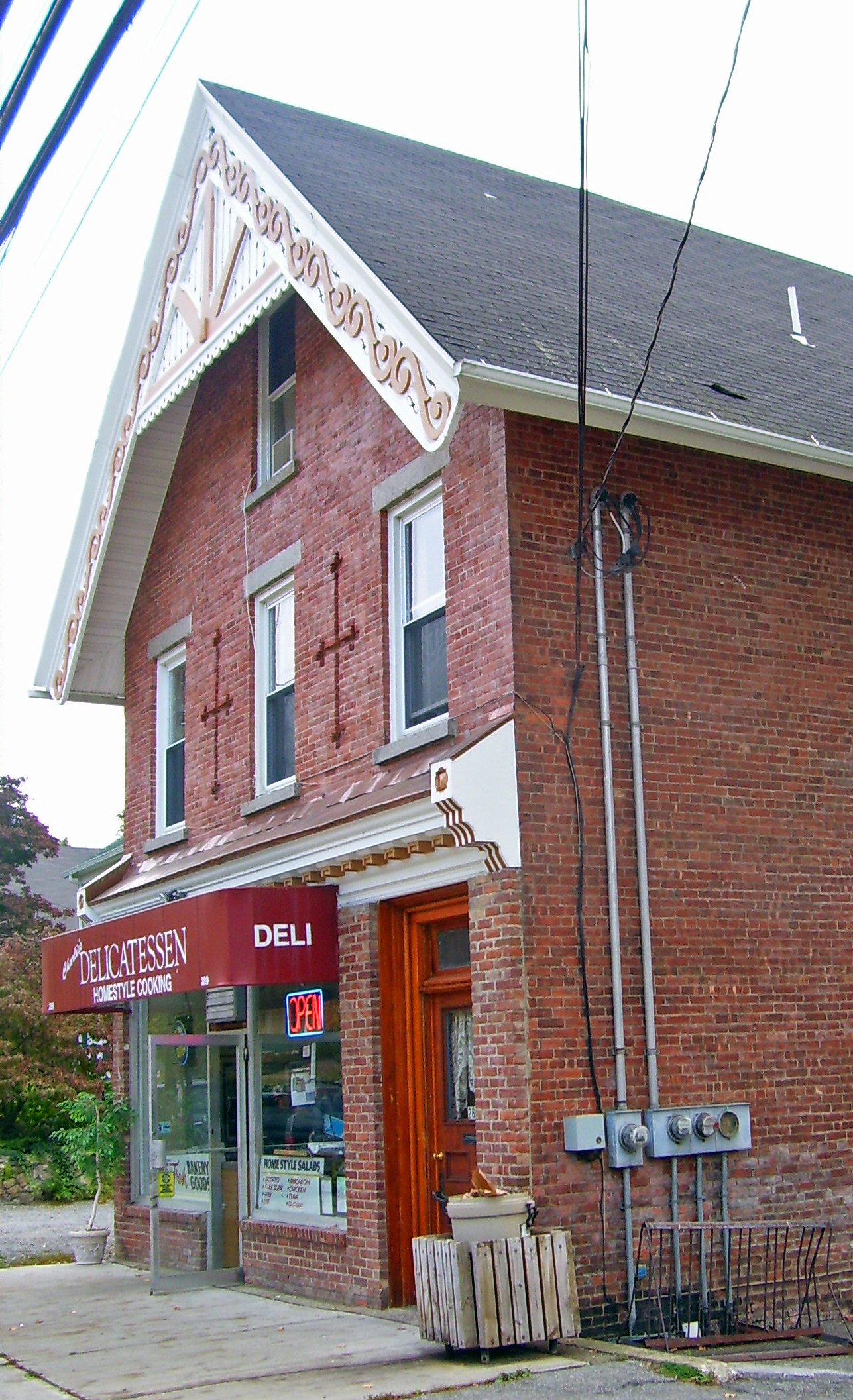
- Front (north) elevation of store building, 2007
- Location: Nelsonville, NY
- Nearest city: Beacon
- Coordinates: 41°25′28″N 73°56′47″W
- Area: 0.4 acres (0.16 ha)
- Built: mid-19th century
- MPS: Hudson Highlands MRA
- NRHP reference No.: 82001237
- Added to NRHP: November 23, 1982

The J.Y. Dykman Flour and Feed Store is located on Main Street (NY 301) in Nelsonville, New York, United States. It is a brick building that today houses a small delicatessen and some apartments in its upper stories. It is the most ornate commercial building in the small village, and in 1982 it was added to the National Register of Historic Places.

It is a 2 1/2-story brick building with a heavily modillioned cornice and decorated bargeboards on the front end of its gabled roof. The sills and lintels are made of stone, with cross and scroll patterns worked into the brick. An oriel window projects from the cross-gable on the west facade.

In 1867, the earliest known map showing Nelsonville, at the time the growing home of workers at the West Point Foundry in nearby Cold Spring, depicts the store at the spot with James Y. Dykman's name attached to it, suggesting it had been there for quite some time. He also had it painted on the wall of the building, where it remained until the late 20th century. A later map, in 1912, when Dykman had opened another store nearby with his name, shows the building still in use as a general store. In the 1950s, its rear was enlarged to accommodate more apartments. It has otherwise remained as it was in the mid-19th century when it was built.
