= J. Y. Dykman Store =

Historic commercial building in New York, United States

- J.Y. Dykman Store
- U.S. National Register of Historic Places
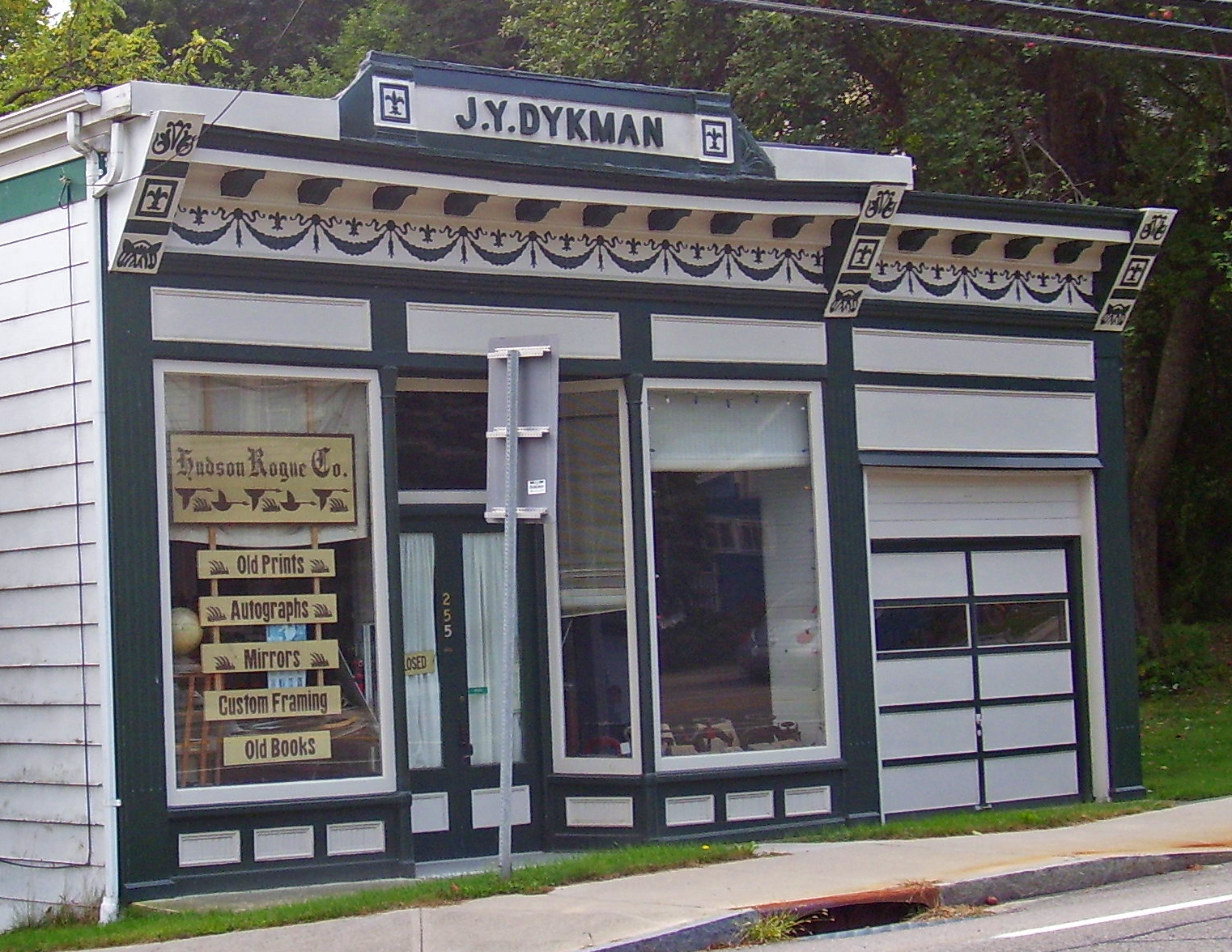
- Front (north) elevation, 2008
- Location: Nelsonville, NY
- Nearest city: Beacon
- Coordinates: 41°25′24″N 73°56′56″W
- Area: 0.3 acres (0.12 ha)
- Built: ca. 1890
- MPS: Hudson Highlands MRA
- NRHP reference No.: 82001238
- Added to NRHP: November 23, 1982

The J.Y. Dykman Store is located at Main (NY 301) and Pearl streets in the village of Nelsonville, New York, United States, across from the Fish and Fur Club, now the village hall. Like that building, it was listed on the National Register of Historic Places in 1982. It is currently an antique map store.

It is a one-story, four-bay clapboard-sided frame building. Three of the front four bays are taken up by wood-framed plate glass windows and the recessed double-door entrance with single-light transom; the western bay is a garage added later on. Above it is a bracketed sheet metal entablature with the words "J.Y. DYKMAN" and fleur-de-lis and swag motifs on the fascia and pilaster capitals.

The 1876 Beers map of the Nelsonville area, the earliest one, shows the corner as part of the Gouverneur estate. By 1912 James Y. Dykman, a prominent local businessman who had already opened a feed store nearby, is listed as the owner of a grocery at the site. By the late 20th century it had become Hudson Rogue, a dealer in antique maps and prints.
