= Joel Frost =

American politician

Joel Frost (September 28, 1765 – September 11, 1827) was an American lawyer and politician from New York.

== Life ==
Joel Frost was born in Carmel, New York on September 28, 1765, the son of John Frost and Huldah (Munson) Frost. He lived in Yorktown, where in 1789 he married Martha Wright (1771–1860), with whom he had several children, among them John Wright Frost (1792–1882), Elizabeth Frost (1794–1890) and Horace Frost (b. 1806).

Joel Frost was a member of the Westchester County Board of Supervisors in 1803. He was a member of the New York State Assembly in 1806 and 1808. When Putnam County was established in 1812, Frost was appointed Surrogate and returned to his birthplace which was the county seat. He served as Surrogate until 1813, and again from 1815 to 1819, and 1821 to 1822. He was a delegate from Putnam County to the New York State Constitutional Convention of 1821.

Frost was elected as a Crawford Democratic-Republican to the 18th United States Congress, holding office from March 4, 1823, to March 3, 1825.

He did not run for reelection, and relocated to Schenectady, where he was residing when he died on September 11, 1827. He was buried at the Gilead Cemetery in Carmel.

U.S. House of Representatives
Preceded by William W. Van Wyck	Member of the U.S. House of Representatives from New York's 4th congressional district 1823–1825	Succeeded by Aaron Ward
