= Gilead Cemetery =

Historic cemetery in New York, United States

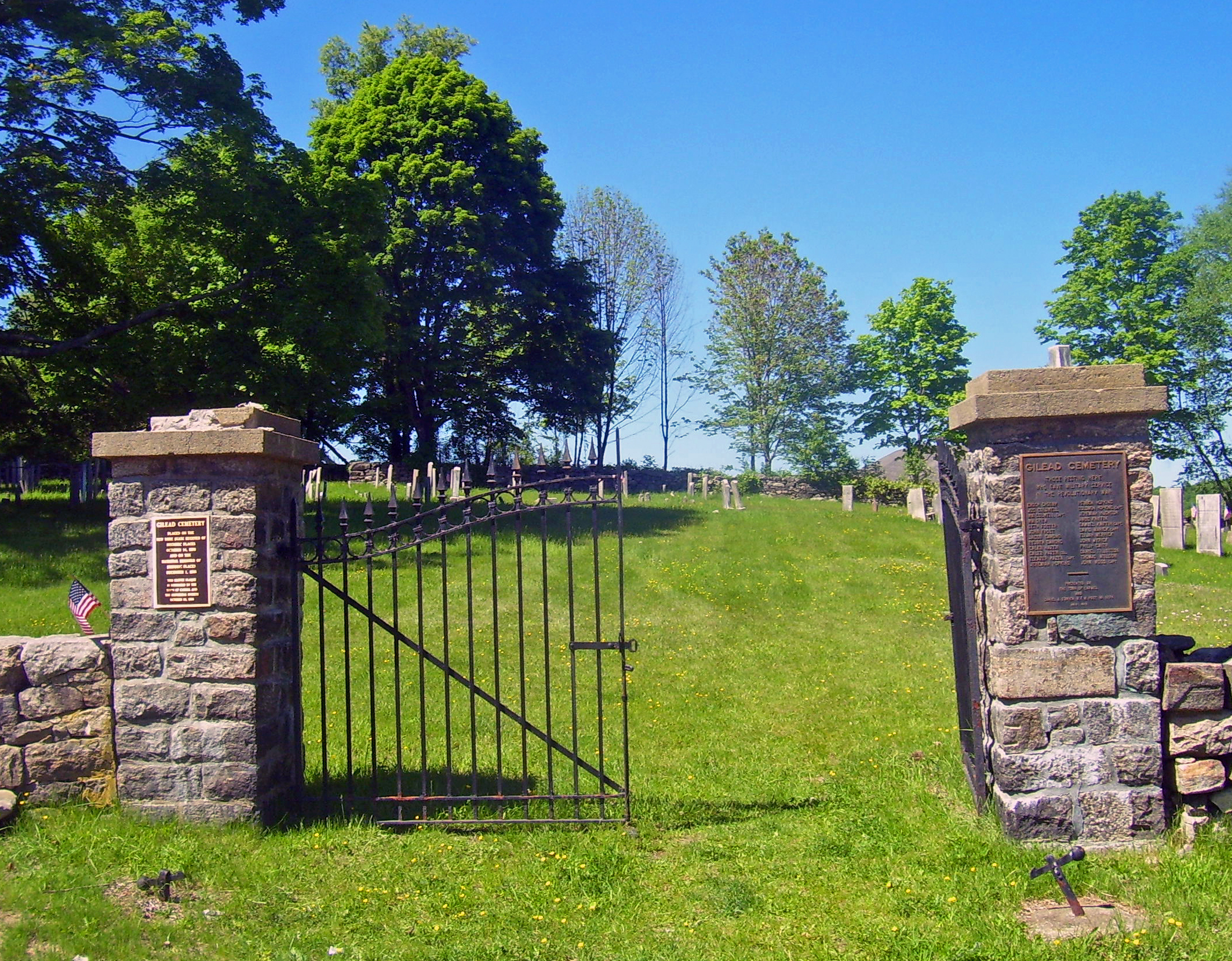
- Main gates to Gilead Cemetery, added in 1914
- Interactive map of Gilead Cemetery

Details
- Established: 1766
- Location: Carmel, New York
- Country: United States
- Coordinates: 41.408246°N 73.673034°W
- Type: public
- Owned by: Town of Carmel
- Size: 1.24 acres (5,000 m^{2})
- No. of graves: 310
- Find a Grave: Gilead Cemetery
- Gilead Cemetery
- U.S. National Register of Historic Places
- Location: Mechanic St., Carmel, New York
- Architect: Anchor Post Iron Works
- NRHP reference No.: 88002684
- Added to NRHP: December 1, 1988

Gilead Cemetery is located in the town of Carmel, New York, United States. It is off a bend in Mechanic Street 1.5 miles (2.4 km) south of the hamlet of Carmel, seat of Putnam County.

Some of the earliest settlers of the region are buried here. It was attached to a Congregational, and later Presbyterian meeting house built ca. 1756 and demolished in 1839. Among those buried here include Enoch Crosby, a Revolutionary War spy believed to be the model for the title character of James Fenimore Cooper's novel The Spy, and Joel Frost, a local politician who later served in the New York State Legislature and for a single term in the House of Representatives.

The headstones themselves also display an unusual range of funerary art from the first graves through the last historically significant ones, in 1929. The earliest illustrate changing Protestant notions of the role of death in the later years of the 18th century. For these reasons it was listed on the National Register of Historic Places in 1988 (entry #88002684).

== Cemetery ==
The cemetery occupies a rough trapezoid 1.24 acres (5,000 m^{2}) in area, sloping gently uphill from the corner. It is surrounded by stone walls from 2 to 4 feet (61 to 122 cm) in height, with a pair of tall stone gateposts flanking the iron gates at the south entrance. An open area just past those gates was the likely site of the meeting house. In the rear of the property several trees rise over 60 feet (18 m) in height.

There are 310 separate gravesites. 280 of these the headstones have legible carvings; another 199 also have footstones. They are made of materials from sandstone to white marble and granite, depending on the era. The earliest graves are dated 1766; the latest is from 1959.

Graves are arranged in rows east to west. Headstones face east and footstones, which usually face the headstones, are instead aside them, an unusual practice. The westernmost row probably faced west originally, but was at some point reoriented.

The largest marker is a 14-ton (13-tonne) monument to Enoch Crosby added in the early 20th century to replace his previous stone, destroyed by vandals and souvenir-hunters. Four family plots are within the cemetery, set off by small metal-and-stone cordons.

== History ==
The future cemetery was part of a tract of land leased by Frederick Philipse III in 1756 to Thomas Crosby, Enoch's father. The meeting house was established quickly, with 57 parishioners signing the letter asking The Rev. Ebenezer Knibloe to be their first pastor, a position he held for three years before yielding to Elnathan Gregory. The church and some other features of the surrounding area would get their name from one of Gregory's widely reprinted sermons, "Is There No Balm in Gilead?"

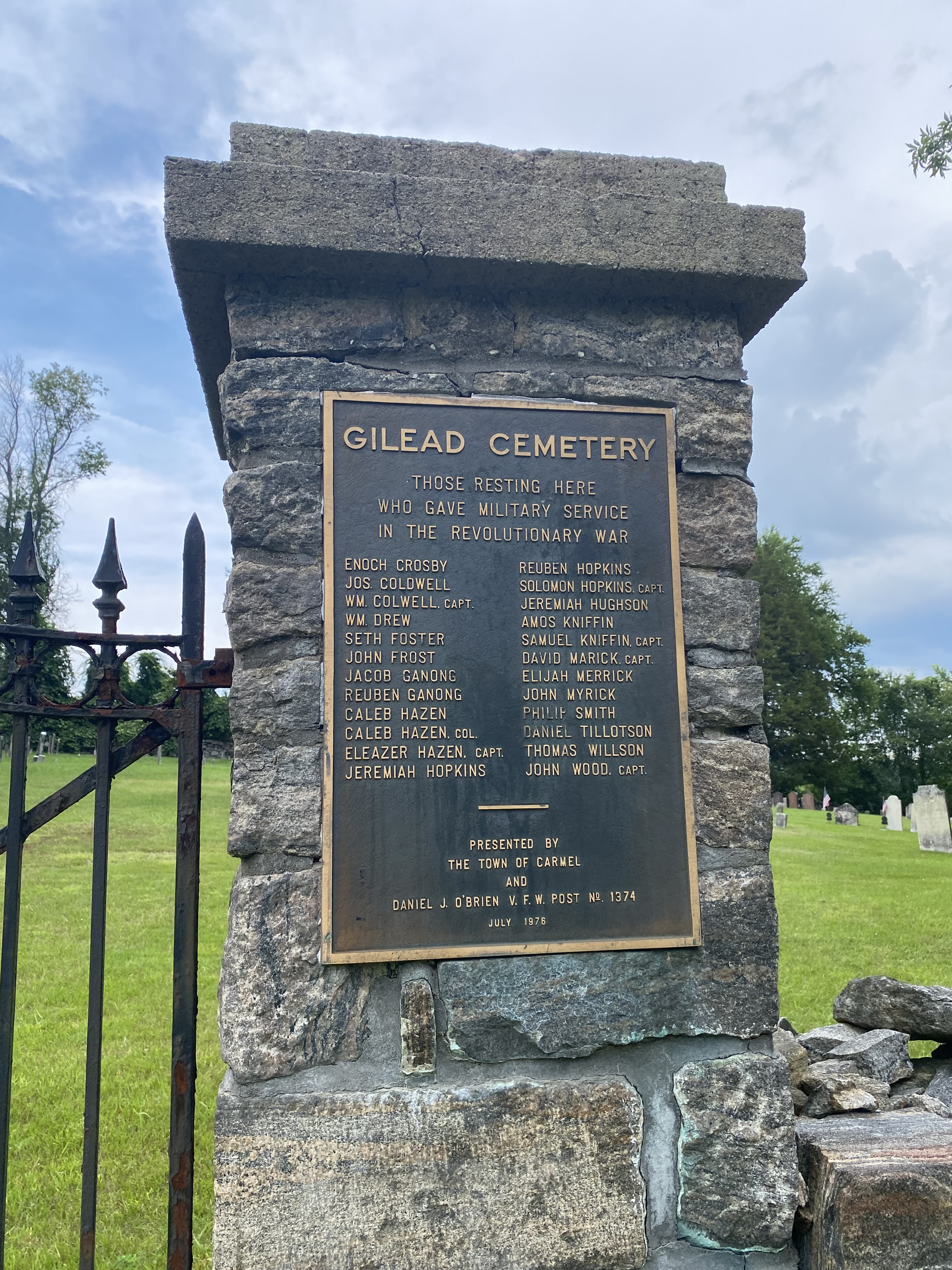
Plaque at cemetery entrance showing names of Revolutionary War veterans buried in it

In 1766, the cemetery received its first burial, Sarah Smith, as the surrounding farm was leased to a new tenant, James Dickenson. It was sold outright to Elisha Cole in 1828. In 1839 the meeting house was torn down and the property became exclusively a cemetery. The stone walls, probably meant to keep livestock from neighboring farms out in the early days, were augmented by work paid for by local benefactor Ferdinand Hopkins, who also had the gates and Crosby's monument added. The Gilead Cemetery Association was created at this time to maintain the cemetery and document its history.

Burials dwindled after the opening of the much larger Raymond Hill Cemetery nearby. Those who chose Gilead as their final resting place were mainly the descendants of those already buried there. In 1959 the last burial took place, although the cemetery, now town property, has been maintained ever since by the cemetery association.

== Funerary art ==
Many of the headstones have high-quality decorative carvings in addition to the usual information about the decedent's birth and death date. This collection of funerary art is more extensive than in other American cemeteries of this size from this period and illustrates changing Protestant notions of death.

Sarah Smith's 1766 gravestone, the oldest in the cemetery, is made of slate and features an inverted half-moon and semi-circular finials. Other graves from that early era are carved mainly from red sandstone, with a few postwar markers of fieldstone reflecting the economic stress of the war. They feature similar designs plus death's heads, skeletons, skulls and starbursts. These were meant to represent the triumphant finality of death.

Later in the 19th century, winged cherubs begin to appear atop headstones, symbolizing the soul's escape from death's clutches into new life. In the 19th century, when white marble became the tombstone material of choice, this belief remained but was symbolized instead through neoclassical imagery of an urn and willow tree. The urn represented death, the tree rebirth in the hereafter.

A few gray granite markers are found from the early and mid-20th century. One of these, Enoch Crosby's monument, features a sword and musket in recognition of his military service.
