= Mike Stahr =

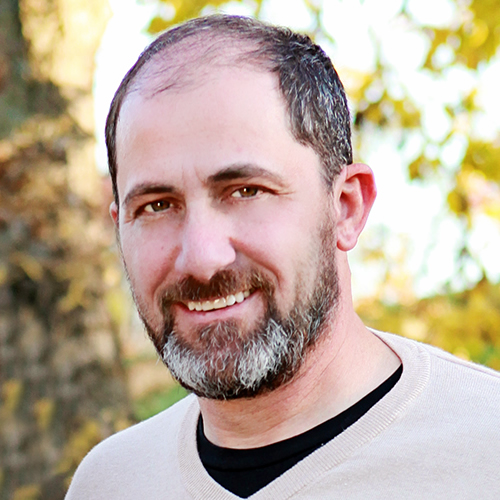
American former middle-distance runner, Mike Stahr

Mike Stahr (born December 9, 1964) is an American former sub-4 miler who had an extensive career in track and field.

== High school career ==
Stahr attended Carmel High School, where he was guided by coach Paul Collins. Stahr's first high-profile victory came in the 1982 Millrose High School Mile, where he won in 4 minutes and 13 seconds against a very talented field of All Americans and a group of runners that were later to be considered some of the Best High School Runners ever. After a victory at Millrose in 1982, Stahr came back in 1983 to defend his crown. Going into the race, Stahr talked about breaking the legendary four-minute barrier. But after a first 400 meters in 58.6 seconds, the race became tactical with Stahr and the other leaders choosing to vary the pace. Stahr held off many challenges in the last half mile and held on to win in 4:10. Stahr went on to capture four New York State Mile Championship Titles and ended his high school career with personal bests of: 400m-47 800m-1:50 1000m-2:24 1500m-3:46 Mile-4:06 2 Mile-9:01.

== Collegiate career ==
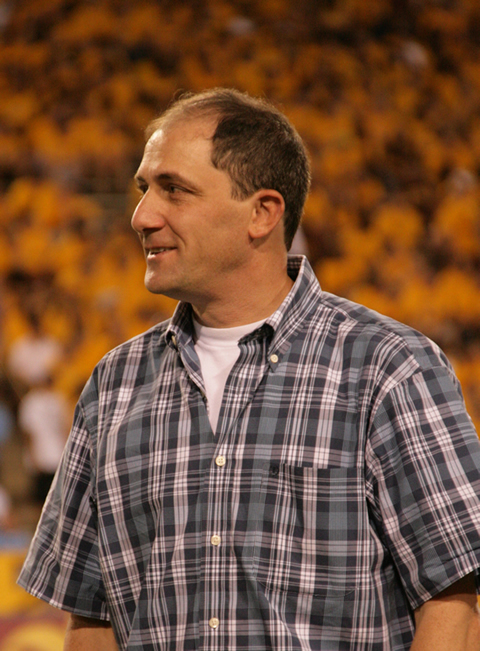
Mike Stahr at the ASU Hall of Fame

Stahr joined Arizona State University in 1983. As a freshman, he made the finals of the NCAA indoor 1000m with the fastest qualifying time (2:23.19) but fell on the second turn. At the Sun Angel Classic he anchored the American and World Record 4x800 with a split between 1:44.8 and 1:45 by officials and coach Len Miller. Their 4x800 team won the Millrose indoor title as well as many other top ranking meets. Still as a freshman, he posted a 45.8 relay split. During his sophomore year he came in 4th at the Pac-10 XC regional meet to earn him a spot on the NCAA XC team where he finished 101st.

In his junior year Stahr transferred to Georgetown University after becoming frustrated with five coaching changes at ASU. His first year at Georgetown was redshirted but yielded his first Sub-4 minute mile -winning a 7 year-old bet with his father, Don. Their bet was a major focus in Stahr's career as Don agreed to quit smoking if Mike could break 4 minutes in the mile.

Stahr's official first eligible year with Georgetown earned him All American in XC among other accomplishments. In 1987 Stahr captured the NCAA Indoor Mile Championship in a time of 4:02 several weeks after his 4x800 anchor leg of 1:46.2 at the indoor BIG East meet. During the outdoor season of '87 he anchored the World Record Distance Medley Relay, running an anchor leg split of 3:54 to carry his team to a time of 9:20.9, eclipsing the previous World Record by two seconds. It still stands as the school record at Georgetown University.

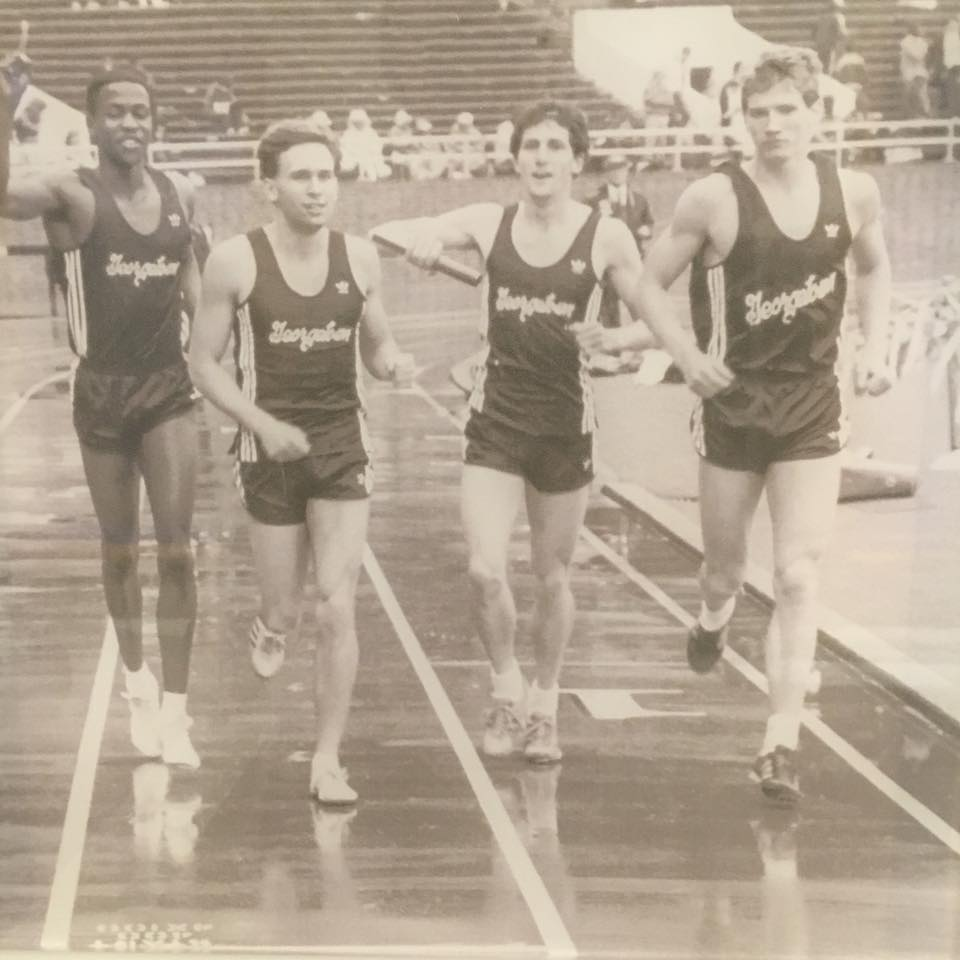
1987 Georgetown University World Record DMR

== Post-collegiate career ==
After graduating from Georgetown, Stahr went on to compete on the pro circuit. In 1988 he qualified for the Olympic Trials in the 800 and 1500 and was 4th in the US Nationals in the 800. Biting off more than he could chew by competing in both the 800 and 1500 at the trials, Stahr raced well but was unable to qualify for the games. In 1992 he qualified for the Trials in the 1500 but was injured two weeks prior to competition and was unable to race. He has been inducted into 5 Athletic Hall-of-Fames: Carmel High School, Arizona State University, Georgetown University, and twice to the Penn Relays Wall-of-Fame. Once as a member of the 1987 DMR and once for his individual accomplishments at the Carnival.

== Today ==
Stahr lives in Oxford, Ohio, with his wife and four children. He works as a database administrator and software developer for the City of Cincinnati - awarded Employee of the Year, co-owner of At Home Silver Care (a company dedicated to supporting the elderly community through companion care), and a private coach for all levels of athletes. He is the founder of the on-line running log, Running2Win.com and has started a non-profit organization, The Anna Foundation where he offers assistance to underprivileged kids in athletics. Mike also volunteers at the Penn Relays each year meeting some of the most iconic athletes in the sport.
