= Carmel High School (Carmel, New York) =

Public high school in New York, US

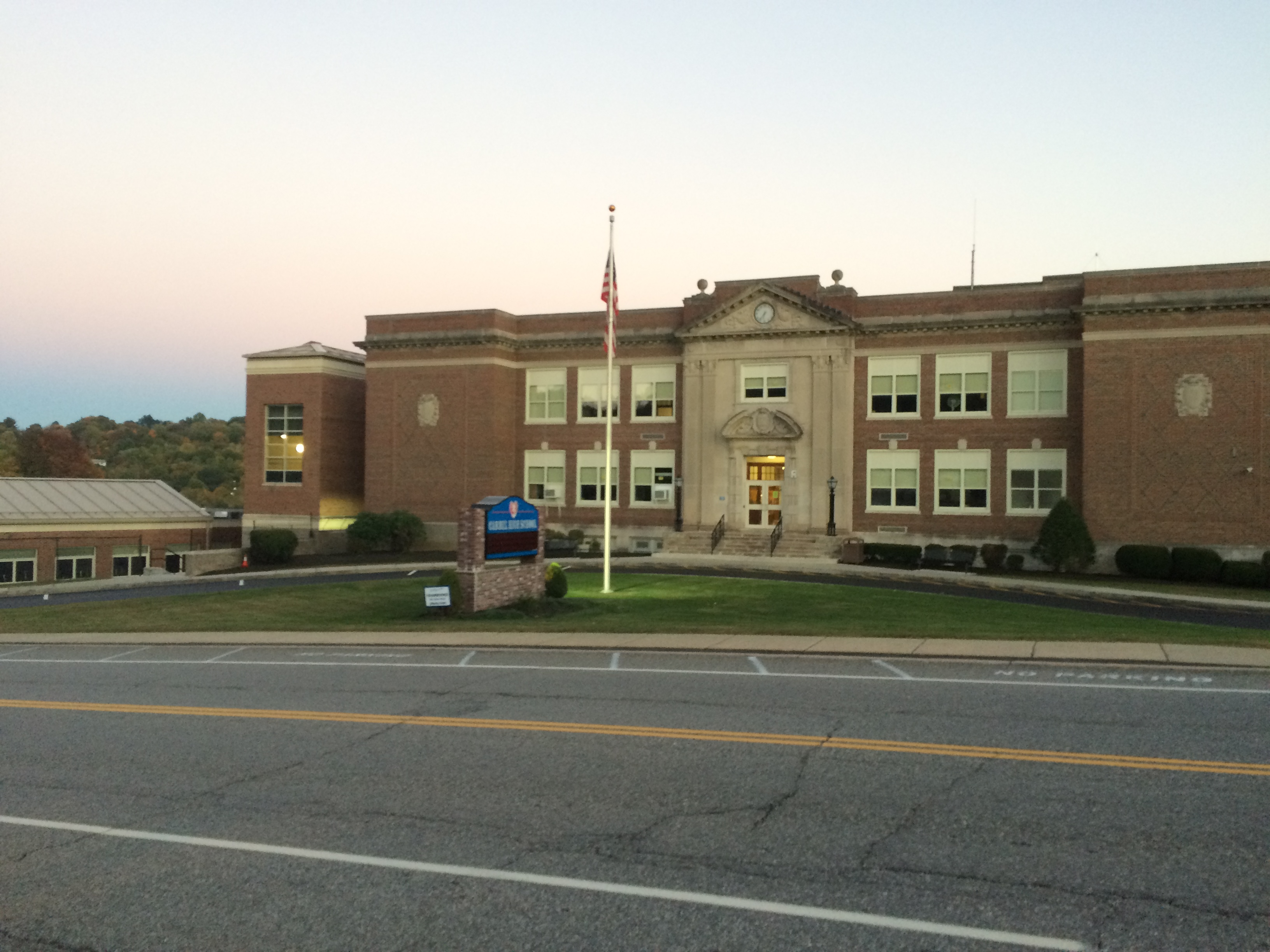

Location
- 30 Fair St; Carmel, (Putnam County), New York 10512; United States
- Coordinates: 41.4274°N 73.6766°W

Information
- School type: Public school (government funded), high school
- School district: Carmel Central School District
- NCES District ID: 3606570
- Superintendent: Mary-Margaret Zehr
- CEEB code: 331235
- NCES School ID: 360657000438
- Principal: Brian Piazza
- Teaching staff: 107.47 (FTE)
- Grades: 9–12
- Enrollment: 1,321 (2023–2024)
- Student to teacher ratio: 12.29
- Language: English
- Campus: Suburb: Large
- Colors: Blue, Red and White
- Athletics: Section 1 (NYSPHSAA)
- Mascot: Rams
- Website: chs.carmelschools.org

Carmel High School is a public high school in Carmel, New York, currently serving grades 9–12. It is the only high school in the Carmel Central School District. The district includes part of Carmel, and part or all of several nearby towns, mostly in Putnam County, New York, but also includes a small number of students from Dutchess County.

School athletic teams are known as the Rams, where the football team won three consecutive Section 1 championships and the NYSPHSAA Class AA football championship during the 2021 season. The school's colors are red, blue and white.

== Principals ==
As the district consolidated, the position of principal at Carmel gradually separated from that of supervising principal of the district, which, in the 1960s, became superintendent of the district after the abolition of county superintendent of schools. Until the 1960s the district was based in Carmel High School.

- Robert Kristeller (died 2002) was the last supervising principal and first superintendent. He took charge in 1943, the year collecting high school newspaper clippings in the library began. He retired in 1970. The school's football field is named in his honor.
- Joseph Z. Dawson, who became vice principal in 1948, took over as principal in 1954. He became Superintendent in 1973 after Kristeller's second successor, Richard R. Meehan, died.
- David D. Odell succeeded Dawson, on an acting basis in the 1973–74 school year and officially the following year, but in 1975 returned for personal reasons to the less stressful job of assistant principal.
- John F. McGuckin, a former mayor of Toms River, New Jersey, served as principal from 1975 to 1978.
- F. James MacDonald, who returned to serving the Carmel district as a member of the board of education in the twenty-first century, succeeded McGuckin.
- Diana Bowers succeeded MacDonald.
- Kevin Carroll succeeded Diana Bowers.
- 26-year veteran teacher Louis Riolo succeeded Kevin Carroll in 2014 upon Carroll's retirement after 14 years as principal and five years assistant principal at Carmel High School. At the end of Carroll's career, he was named regional administrator of the year.

Carmel High School's history traces back to the one-room schoolhouses that once dotted the towns of Carmel, Kent, and Patterson, descending most directly from Carmel School District Number 7, which served the hamlet of Carmel proper.

=== Previous buildings ===
In 1853, Carmel District Number 7 obtained the two-room building of a private school that closed on the shore of Lake Gleneida. This structure was used until 1893 when the City of New York claimed the lake shore (the lake being part of its reservoir system) and obliged all structures on that side of Gleneida Avenue (Carmel's "Main Street", today one end of New York State Route 52) to be moved or demolished. Some buildings were moved across the street on rollers, but the schoolhouse was moved down nearby Brewster Avenue (today part of U.S. Route 6), and two additional rooms were built under it.

Both growth (additions to the building in 1899 and 1918) and accreditation (as a union school in June 1899, a middle school in October 1900, a senior school in January 1904, and finally as a high school in June 1906) followed as neighboring districts consolidated. The district became Union Free School District Number Ten. The school continued to serve grades 1–12. The first annual commencement was held June 22, 1908, at the Mount Carmel Baptist Church, according to an invitation reproduced in the 1899–1999 alumni directory. The centennial of this was commemorated in 2008, though the school had existed before 1908, and the present building's 75th anniversary had been celebrated as a school anniversary in 2004.

In 1924, a fire devastated much of Carmel's business district, destroying, among other buildings, the hotel Smalley's Inn (which survives today as a restaurant) and the headquarters of Putnam County National Bank (which built a new stone main office). The entirely wooden schoolhouse was felt to be unsafe. Arrangements were made for a new, fire resistant school to be constructed in 1929 at a cost of $250,000.

=== The present building ===
The present building was constructed on Fair Street, which meets Route 52/Gleneida Avenue near the site of the 1924 fire (and later the 1974 fire). The site was adjacent to what was the Putnam County Fairgrounds (now included in the current campus). The school moved over the Easter vacation of 1930.

The oldest section of the building gives the school its address, 30 Fair Street. This main door facing the street was only for faculty and members of the senior class, all younger students being obliged to enter by one of the doors at the two sides of the building, marked "Boys" on the left and "Girls" on the right (the latter remains but the former was removed in the most recent addition).

The red brick and concrete motif of this construction was continued in all of the numerous later additions to the school.

==== 1936 addition ====
By 1936, Union Free School District Number Ten had become Carmel Central School District Number 2 according to the plaque on a new addition constructed by the Public Works Administration. The district would not shed the Number 2 until the 1970s when Carmel Central School District Number 1 formally became the Mahopac School District.

Not only had small, nearby districts continued to consolidate, a process that wasn't finished until the 1950s, but kindergarten was added as the grade 1–12 school became a K-12 school.

The new addition extended back from the roofline of the original part of the building, but as it extended downhill it had a lower floor. The school also began the tradition that the library would be relocated each time the main building was added to. The original library became a classroom, the librarian's office a department office. The new library in the rear wing later became two classrooms, the adjoining librarian's office another department office, but wooden doors with lettering designating their original purpose were still there in the 1970s. Also included were a gymnasium and workshop.

==== 1950 annex ====
A separate one-story building was constructed in 1950 that took some of the lower-grade students. Over the years its purpose changed, thus in the 1970s it was the English annex, and after the 1980 addition, it succeeded a converted garage next door (which reverted to its original purpose) as the music annex.

==== 1950s additions ====
In 1953 a new gymnasium was constructed within the L formed by the original building facing Fair Street, and the 1936 wing extending back from it. In 1957 an extension was built that provided an external entrance, a box office for the gymnasium, and a weight room upstairs. This brought the right-side wall, as viewed from Fair Street, flush with that of the old building, the L now becoming oblong.

During this period the Kent School was constructed in the Town of Kent in 1954 and added to in 1958, so the high school ceased to be a K-12 school (it previously educated all students in the entire consolidated district except those attending the old elementary school in Patterson, which served only that part of the district). As the lower-grade students departed, certain areas (now serving grades 7–12) were re-purposed.

==== 1965 addition ====
Nonetheless, enrolment in the district continued to grow and the school was crowded. In 1963 district voters approved a $1.8 million bond issue that covered both the construction of Kent Primary School (which took the lower grades from the Kent School, renamed Kent Elementary School, and opened in November 1964) and an addition to the High School (which opened in January 1965).

This involved a substantial expansion of the school complex further down Fair Street from Gleneida Avenue, into the now-former Fairgrounds. The two-story addition attached to the lower levels of the 1936 wing and was T-shaped. Beyond this a residence known as the Klock House was acquired, and Supervising Principal Kristeller and his staff moved there in 1964.A new parking lot surrounded the new addition and this house.

The head of the T was classrooms, principally science laboratories. The shaft of the T was a double-loaded corridor on the lower level and had windows facing Fair Street on the upper level, while the farther side was home to the new library. On the lower level of the shaft the street side hosted the cafeteria and kitchen and the farther side was wood and metal shops (the basement of the 1936 wing became art classrooms).

==== 1970s renovations ====
In 1970 the George Fischer Middle School opened, and the 7th and 8th grades moved there from the high school, along with the former assistant principal for the "junior high school", which included a larger, more up-to-date auditorium than the high school, and since then, the high school's music production workshops, dramatic plays, concerts, and other events have been held at the middle school. The auditorium's floor was levelled and its stage lowered to become the new library (the balcony was used for storage). The library constructed in 1964–65 became mathematics classrooms. A door sign indicating it was once the library remained through the 1970s.

In 1971 the Mathew Paterson Elementary School replaced Patterson School, which replaced the Klock House; the latter became home to The Carmel Teachers Federal Credit Union, then became the high school's special education programs.

==== 1980 addition ====
In December 1977, a district referendum approved a new gymnasium-and-classroom addition, totaling 67,200 square feet (6,240 m^{2}), for $5,800,000. This structure was constructed on the former Robert Kristeller Field (a football field in the middle of an athletics track) to the rear of the main building and connected to the 1965 and 1936 wings by skywalks.

The new gymnasium remains one of the largest in the area and hosted the New York State high school gymnastics championships in March 2008. The 1953 gymnasium became the cafeteria, the 1936 gymnasium became the guidance office, and the 1965 cafeteria became the library.

The recent library was then partially restored to its former purpose, a raised stage erected within the proscenium, as "Kathryn Casey Hall", named for the longest-serving teacher in school history.

==== 21st century ====
Pressure for expansion continued, not so much because of enrolment growth (the 1978 and 2008 graduating classes both numbered about 350 and with the classes in the 1980s between 350 and 375 with the graduating Class of 1983 (the largest class ever) with 450) but the need to accommodate students and state mandates more comfortably. A$44 million bond issue including additions to all three elementary schools and to Carmel High (where a laboratory wing between the 1936 and 1980 wings was proposed) failed in December 2000. In 2004, after turnover in board of education membership, a $16 million bond issue to add to the middle school and high school was passed, with the new additions promised in 2006.

The middle school addition opened in January 2007 with future renovations planned, and the high school addition opened in the 2007–08 school year with future renovations planned.

The new addition was located between the 1965 addition and Fair Street, with the Klock House being demolished to compensate for the lost parking space and special education being accommodated in the 1950 annex and main building. As had been the thrust of the defeated proposal, the main purpose of the new addition was to add a much needed science wing, new and upgraded library along with improving the overcrowded hallways due to poor architectural flow of the old complex. The most recent library was renovated as art classrooms, and the guidance office moved out of the 1936 gymnasium to make room for a planned student lounge instead of another help center with the old guidance offices becoming extra-curricular storage rooms (which have since been moved due to the creation of the Makerspace.

In 2015, the extra-curricular storage rooms (which were the old guidance offices) were converted to a maker space. The maker space is a fabrication laboratory that serves as a location for students to design and prototype projects, in addition to serving as a classroom for college-level advanced technology education classes as well as video production classes. The maker space features a television studio, prototyping machines (CNC, 3-D printers, laser cutters, etc.), offices as well as a large main area where classes are held. The school also received a new turf football field and track in the same location as the previous ones.
