= Putnam County Courthouse (New York) =

- U.S. National Register of Historic Places
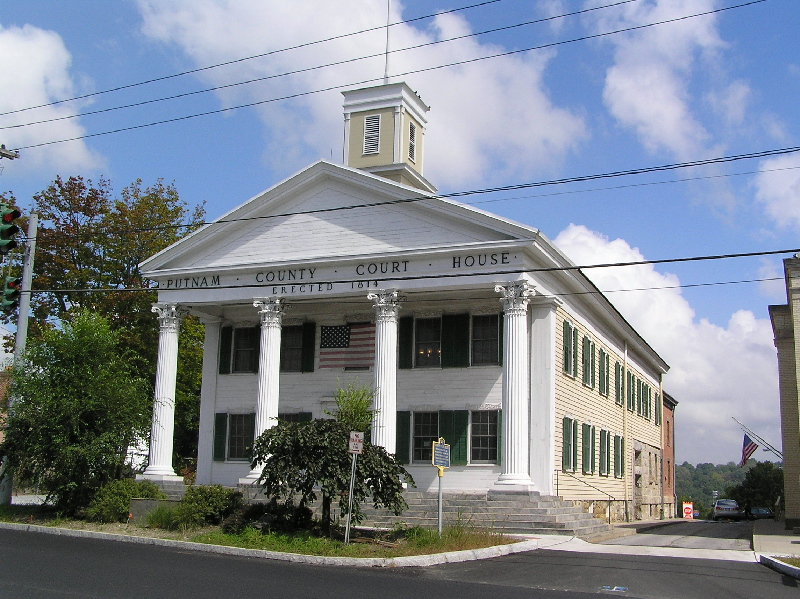
- Front (west) elevation, 2006

- Location within New York Location within the United States
- Interactive map showing the location for Putnam County Courthouse
- Location: Carmel, NY
- Nearest city: Danbury, CT
- Coordinates: 41°25′34.8″N 73°40′43″W
- Area: 0.5 acres (2,000 m^{2})
- Built: 1814, renovated 1847
- Architect: James Townsend
- Architectural style: Classical Revival
- NRHP reference No.: 76001264
- Added to NRHP: 1976

The Putnam County Courthouse (Note: the name on the building is actually "Putnam County Court House" (two words) while the newer building is marked "Putnam County Courthouse". In current practice the older building is called the "Historic Courthouse".) is a historic courthouse in the hamlet of Carmel, New York, the county seat of Putnam County. Located on Gleneida Avenue (NY 52) on the shore of Lake Gleneida, it was built in 1814, two years after the county was established. It is the second-oldest county courthouse still in use in the state after Fulton County's.

In 1847 it was renovated extensively. At that time the Classical Revival portico and columns were added. Architect James Townsend used commercially available (although inexact) versions of the Corinthian capitals from the Monument of Lysicrates in Athens. For this and its historic importance in the county's history it was added to the National Register of Historic Places in 1976.

== Building ==
The courthouse is a two-story, 5-by-8-bay rectangular gable-roofed frame building, with clapboard siding on the north and south sides and horizontal planks on its west (front) facade. The pedimented gable is supported by the four Corinthian columns, behind which is the main entrance, with molded classical detail. Similar ornamentation can be found on the window lintels. The two front corners have large pilasters; the original stone plinth blocks have been replaced with concrete copies, and the astragals taken down to help prevent dry rot in the columns.

The stone walls of the original county jail are still visible on the south side. A two-bay east wing, added later, extends from the rear. A cupola is atop the roof.

== History ==
The New York state legislature separated Putnam County from Dutchess County to its north in 1812. Trials in Putnam County were held in Carmel's Baptist meeting house until a county courthouse could be built. After three months, one state legislator who had voted for Putnam County's creation, Robert Weeks, sold it a one-half acre (2,000 m^{2}) lot in the middle of the hamlet of Carmel.

A local builder and iron miner, General James Townsend, was hired for the job. He finished it two years later for just under $4,000, using some of his own iron, which still remains in the jail section. It opened for court on February 15, 1815.

The county grew, and by the 1840s the original courthouse could not handle its workload. As much of the county's population and its easiest access was along the Hudson River, officials initially decided to build a second courthouse in Cold Spring, at the western end of the road that became New York Route 301. But a deed restriction in the original land acquisition forbade the county from building its courthouse anywhere but the original land, and so the existing courthouse was renovated and expanded into today's structure. The Corinthian column capitals, popular in pattern books of the time, were likely carved in New York City and shipped to Carmel, as they were for many other buildings in the lower and mid-Hudson where similar capitals have been found.

In 1855 another jail wing was built to replace the one on the northeast corner. The county sheriff began living in the building at this time, and it became a tradition for his wife to cook food for the jail inmates. Another jail wing was built in 1907.

A fire in 1924 destroyed most of the upper story, which was rebuilt to its original appearance. The sheriffs and their wives moved out in 1966, and eleven years later the jail was closed. In December 1988 the courthouse was closed for repairs, ending 174 years of continuous use.

These took six years, longer than expected, due to problems encountered. Since it reopened in 1994, it has been home to two of the county's judges and their chambers. The old jail cells have been used mainly as storage space. A newer, more modern court facility was built behind the Putnam County Office Building and opened January 2, 2008, and most court functions relocated there. Surrogates Court is still held in the original building, and the main courtroom is also used as the legislative chambers of the Putnam County Legislature.

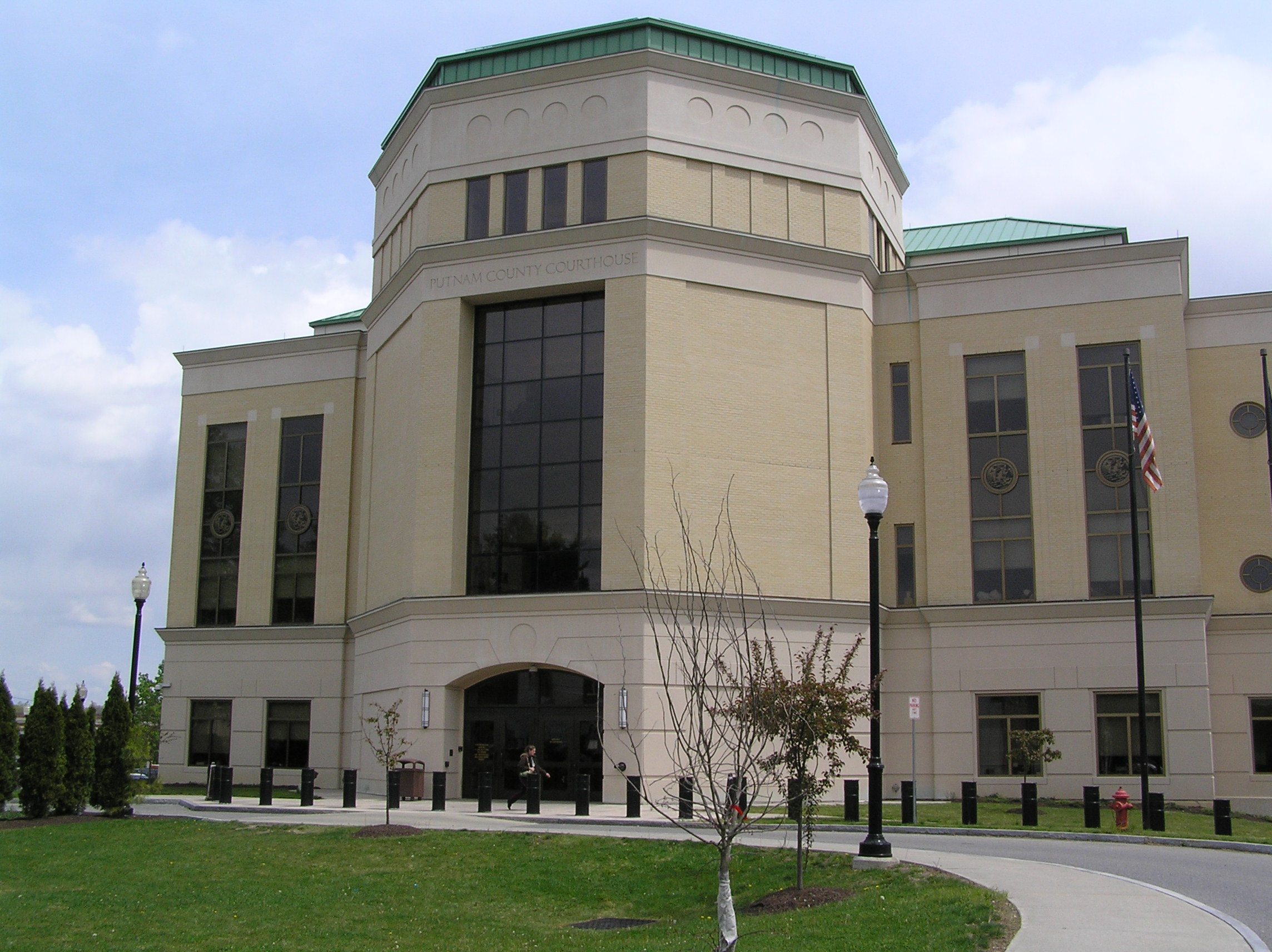
The new Putnam County Courthouse

== See also ==
- National Register of Historic Places listings in Putnam County, New York
