= New York State Route 301 =

State highway in Putnam County, New York, US

New York State Route 301
- Map of Putnam County in southeastern New York with NY 301 highlighted in red

Route information
- Maintained by NYSDOT
- Length: 19.04 mi (30.64 km)
- Existed: 1930–present

Major junctions
- West end: NY 9D in Cold Spring
- US 9 in Philipstown; Taconic State Parkway in Putnam Valley
- East end: NY 52 in Carmel

Location
- Country: United States
- State: New York
- Counties: Putnam

Highway system
- New York Highways; Interstate; US; State; Reference; Parkways
← NY 300	→ NY 302

New York State Route 301 (NY 301), also known as the Hudson River Turnpike, is an intra-county state highway stretching across three-quarters of Putnam County, New York, in the United States. The western terminus of NY 301 is at an intersection with NY 9D in Cold Spring. Its eastern terminus is at a junction with NY 52 in Carmel. Along the way, NY 301 meets U.S. Route 9 (US 9) and the Taconic State Parkway and passes through Clarence Fahnestock State Park. The section of the route between NY 9D and US 9 is ceremonially designated as the Sergeant Albert Ireland Memorial Highway, and the section between Gipsy Trail Road and Belden Road in Carmel was designated John McArdle Memorial Highway under legislation signed by Governor Kathy Hochul in September 2025. This section is basically the causeway over West Branch Reservoir that directly connects those two intersections (and is confusingly the site of a historical marker about a 19th-century wooden structure called "Carver Bridge" that was some distance away crossing the river flooded to form the reservoir, but the causeway itself is not Carver Bridge). The road as a whole has long been designated Cold Spring-Carmel Pike on United States Geological Survey Quadrangle Maps.

NY 301 was assigned as part of the 1930 renumbering of state highways in New York, but only to the portion of its modern alignment west of US 9. At the same time, the section of what is now NY 301 between Kent Cliffs and Carmel became part of New York State Route 130, an east–west route that continued southwest from Kent Cliffs to Peekskill. NY 301 was extended east to Kent Cliffs by 1932 via the Philipstown Turnpike and to Carmel c. 1934 by way of NY 130.

== Route description ==
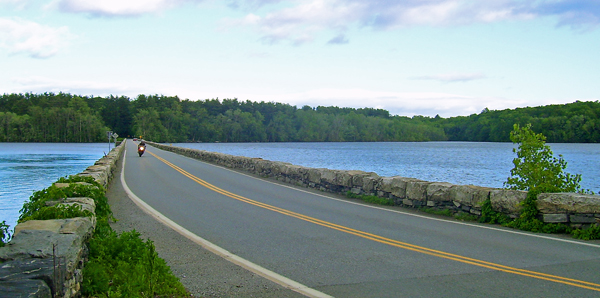
Causeway carrying NY 301 across the West Branch Reservoir (section now designated John McArdle Memorial Highway)

The western terminus of NY 301 is at a four-way junction with NY 9D in Cold Spring. At the intersection, Morris Avenue enters from the north, Chestnut Street comes in from the south, and Main Street enters from the west and leaves to the east on NY 301. The route climbs a hill into the Philipstown village of Nelsonville, where it remains Main Street until transitioning into Cold Spring Carmel Road and passing near the southeast border of the Hudson Highlands State Park. It crosses US 9, locally Albany Post Road, at Mekeel Corners and continues northeast into the woods of the Clarence Fahnestock State Park.

The highway crosses over Clove Creek a few times and turns slightly towards the southeast; however, it soon resumes a northeasterly course as the Cold Spring Turnpike. Continuing through the state park, NY 301 skirts the southern bank of Lake Canopus before crossing the Taconic State Parkway in Putnam Valley. Roughly 3.5 miles (5.6 km) to the northeast at Mead Corners, NY 301 bears southeast toward Carmel after passing north of Lake Sagamore, then hugs the western shore of Boyds Corner Reservoir—part of the Croton Watershed of the New York City water supply system. Shortly thereafter, NY 301 follows the inside of the western fork of the West Branch Reservoir (also NYC watershed) past the former colonial settlement of Coles Mills just south of the Nimham Mountain State Forest, before bisecting the body of water via a causeway.

NY 301 ends at NY 52 (Gleneida Avenue) to the north of Lake Gleneida in the county seat of Carmel. Lake Gleneida is a controlled lake, created when an original pond was dammed in 1870, once more part of the Croton Watershed. At the far end of the junction is the Putnam County Courthouse, a National Register of Historic Places-listed structure that was first constructed in 1814. The eastern terminus of NY 301 is just 0.25 miles (0.40 km) north of NY 52's eastern terminus at US 6.

== History ==
=== Philipstown Turnpike ===
The portion of modern-day NY 301 west of Meads Corners was originally part of the Philipstown Turnpike (see List of turnpikes in New York). Initially, the county's proximity to the Hudson River supplied cheap means of transporting goods to Albany and New York City, though in the winter months, the river froze over. To resolve the issue, in 1815, the Philipstown Turnpike Company was organized to improve upon a toll road from Cold Spring to the Connecticut border. On April 15, 1815, "an act to incorporate the Philipstown turnpike company in the county of Putnam" was passed. East of the Connecticut border, the turnpike continued as the New Milford and Sherman Turnpike.

On the turnpike, wagons transported manufactures inland, and carried produce from the eastern part of the county. Before the advent of the railroad, the road was a business center for much of the county. One of the intentions of the turnpike was to "greatly promote the public good, as well contribute to their individual interest". However, the turnpike was eventually abandoned, because the tolls received were not sufficient to defray the expense of maintaining the road and associated bridges. The tolls were also inadequate for investors in the Philipstown Turnpike Company to make a profit.

=== Designation and recent history ===
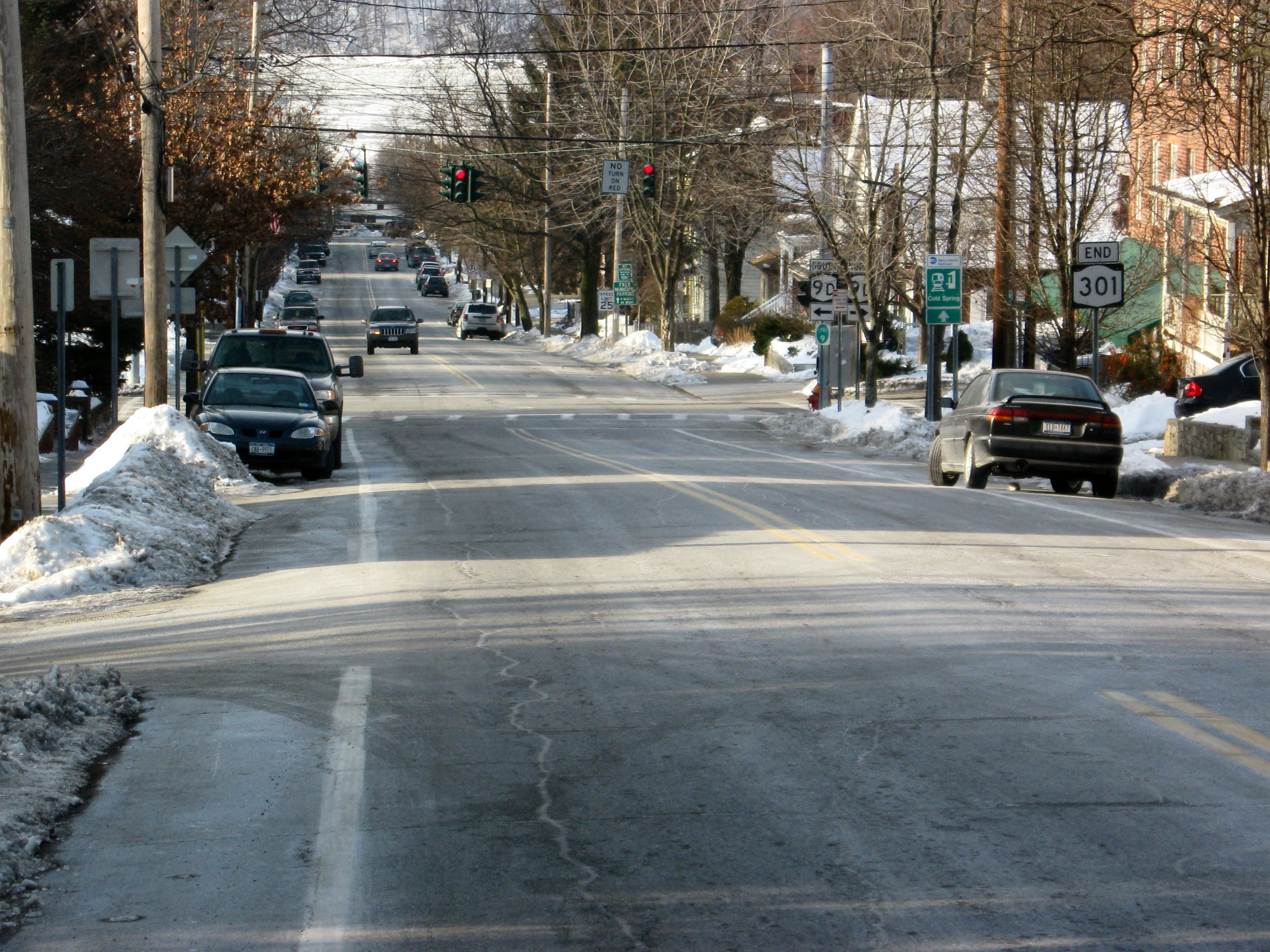
NY 301's western terminus at NY 9D in Cold Spring.

NY 301 was assigned as part of the 1930 renumbering of state highways in New York to the portion of its modern alignment west of US 9. At the same time, the section of what is now NY 301 from County Route 21 (CR 21) in Kent Cliffs to NY 52 in Carmel was designated as part of NY 130, which continued southwest from Kent Cliffs to Peekskill via CR 21, Oregon Road, and Division Street on the route of the 1810 Westchester and Dutchess Turnpike which had crossed the Philipstown Turnpike at what was then Foshay Corners before the 1872 sale of the surrounding land by James Foshay to Gilbert Mead. By 1932, NY 301 was extended eastward to NY 130 in Kent Cliffs by way of its modern alignment. NY 130 was replaced by an extended NY 301 from Kent Cliffs to Carmel c. 1934 and eliminated entirely c. 1938.

The section of NY 301 from the vicinity of Kittridge Drive, a local street southeast of Kent Cliffs, to NY 52 was initially county-maintained as CR 47. On April 1, 1980, ownership and maintenance of this section of the route was transferred to the state of New York as part of a highway maintenance swap between the two levels of government. The concurrent CR 47 designation was subsequently eliminated; however, the number was later reused for a 0.2-mile (0.3 km) former alignment of NY 301 in Kent Cliffs.

On August 20, 2002, the portion of NY 301 between NY 9D and US 9 was designated as the "Sergeant Albert Ireland Memorial Highway". The ceremonial designation honors Albert L. Ireland, a U.S. Marine Corps sergeant from Cold Spring who was awarded many citations, including nine Purple Hearts, for his service during World War II and the Korean War. In June 2012, the entire roadway was designated as the Hudson River Turnpike by Putnam County with the intent of reminding "drivers of the picturesque landscape and historic areas along its path".

== Major intersections ==
The entire route is in Putnam County.

Location	mi	km	Destinations	Notes
Cold Spring	0.00	0.00	NY 9D – Cold Spring Station	Western terminus
Philipstown	2.48	3.99	US 9 – Fishkill, Peekskill	
Putnam Valley	8.63	13.89	Taconic State Parkway	Exits 31A-B on Taconic State Parkway
Carmel	19.04	30.64	NY 52 (Gleneida Avenue)	Eastern terminus; hamlet of Carmel
1.000 mi = 1.609 km; 1.000 km = 0.621 mi

== See also ==
- List of county routes in Putnam County, New York
