= Carmel Hamlet, New York =

Carmel, New York
- Hamlet and Census-designated place
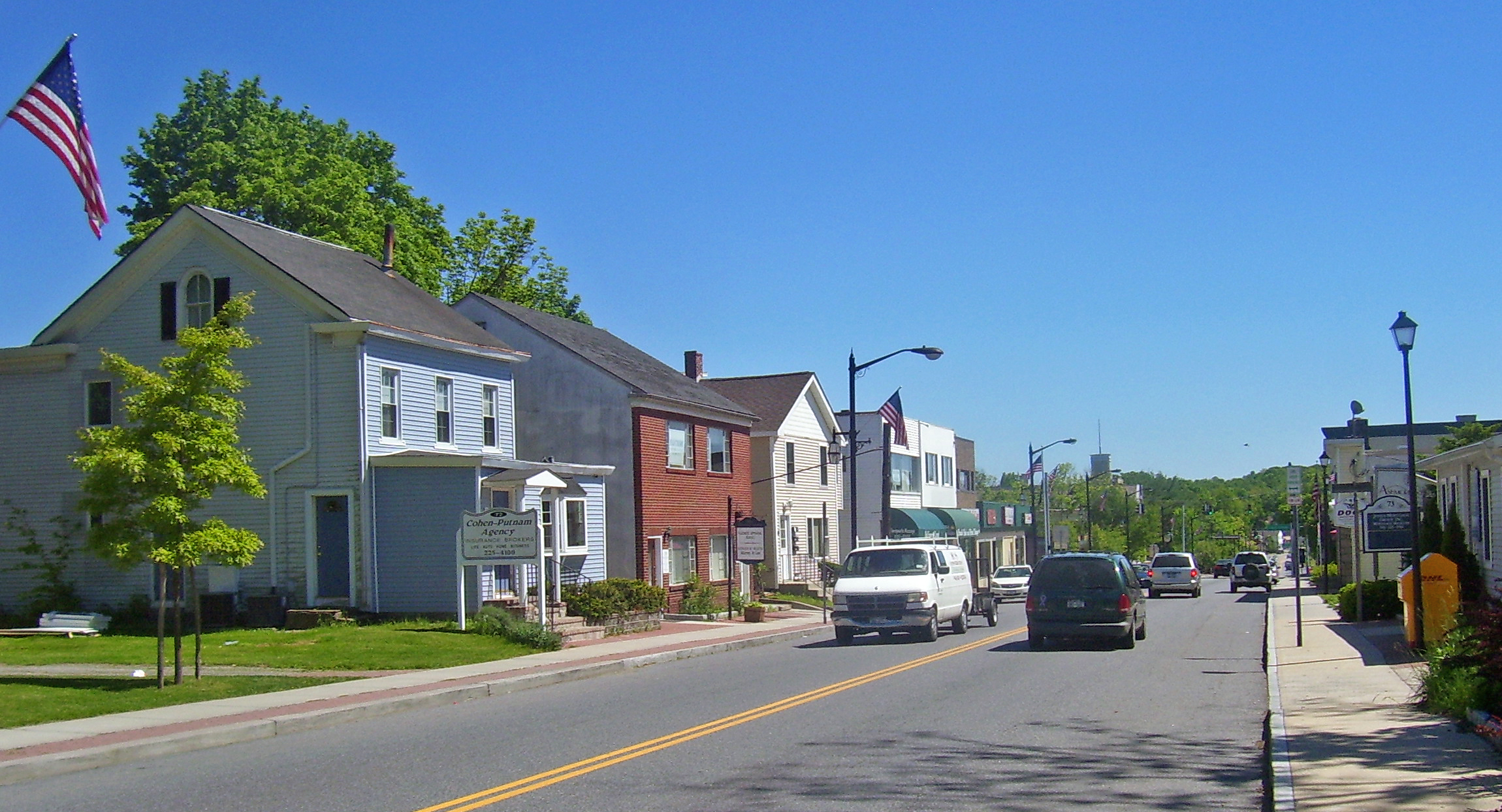
- Downtown, looking east on NY 52

- Location in Putnam County and the state of New York.
- Coordinates: 41°25′34″N 73°40′44″W
- Country: United States
- State: New York
- Region: Hudson Valley
- County: Putnam
- Settled: 1795
- Named for: Likely Mount Carmel

Area
  - Total: 11.29 sq mi (29.24 km^{2})
  - Land: 9.24 sq mi (23.92 km^{2})
  - Water: 2.05 sq mi (5.32 km^{2})
- Elevation: 530 ft (160 m)

Population (2020)
  - Total: 7,538
  - Density: 816.2/sq mi (315.14/km^{2})
- Time zone: UTC-5 (Eastern (EST))
  - Summer (DST): UTC-4 (EDT)
- ZIP Code: 10512
- Area code: 845
- FIPS code: 36-12518

Carmel Hamlet, commonly known simply as Carmel, is a hamlet and census-designated place (CDP) located in the Town of Carmel in Putnam County, New York, United States. As of the 2010 census, the population was 6,817.

The hamlet is the site of the historic County Court House (built 1814), the David D. Bruen County Office Building, and other structures, and borders Lake Gleneida. Next to the lake stands a bronze statue commemorating Sybil Ludington.

== Geography ==
Carmel Hamlet is located at 41°25′14″N 73°40′38″W (41.420535, -73.677292).

According to the United States Census Bureau, the community has a total area of 10.4 square miles (26.9 km^{2}), of which 8.3 square miles (21.6 km^{2}) is land and 2.0 square miles (5.3 km^{2}), or 19.78%, is water.

The hamlet and CDP do NOT include the 43 square miles of the Town of Kent, New York, the great bulk of which gets its mail delivered from the post office in Carmel hamlet, but Google Maps generates "Carmel Hamlet, New York 10512" addresses for anywhere that gets its mail from that post office (the official name of the ZIP code and post office is simply "Carmel" and the portion of its service area in Kent has the approved optional USPS designation "Kent Lakes"). The Hamlet of Carmel Civic Association has its own hamlet map somewhat more focussed on the actual community than the Census Bureau map.

== Demographics ==
Historical population
Census	Pop.	Note	%±
2020	7,538		—
U.S. Decennial Census

As of the census of 2000, there were 5,650 people, 1,975 households, and 1,449 families residing in the community. The population density was 665.2 inhabitants per square mile (256.8/km^{2}). There were 2,034 housing units at an average density of 239.5 per square mile (92.5/km^{2}). The racial makeup of the CDP was 93.42% White, 1.56% African American, 0.25% Native American, 0.80% Asian, 0.02% Pacific Islander, 2.16% from other races, and 1.81% from two or more races. Hispanic or Latino of any race were 7.89% of the population.

There were 1,975 households, out of which 35.2% had children under the age of 18 living with them, 62.8% were married couples living together, 6.9% had a female householder with no husband present, and 26.6% were non-families. 21.8% of all households were made up of individuals, and 8.8% had someone living alone who was 65 years of age or older. The average household size was 2.77 and the average family size was 3.26.

In the hamlet the population was spread out, with 25.1% under the age of 18, 5.7% from 18 to 24, 33.1% from 25 to 44, 23.5% from 45 to 64, and 12.6% who were 65 years of age or older. The median age was 38 years. For every 100 females, there were 98.3 males. For every 100 females age 18 and over, there were 95.3 males.

The median income for a household in the community was $66,755, and the median income for a family was $85,488. Males had a median income of $51,910 versus $36,612 for females. The per capita income for the CDP was $29,523. About 3.4% of families and 5.1% of the population were below the poverty line, including 3.5% of those under age 18 and 7.2% of those age 65 or over.

== Education ==
The census-designated place is divided between the following school districts: Carmel Central School District, Mahopac Central School District, and Brewster Central School District.

== See also ==
- Town of Carmel Police Department (New York)
- Downstate New York
