= Carmel, New York =

- Town
- Town of Carmel
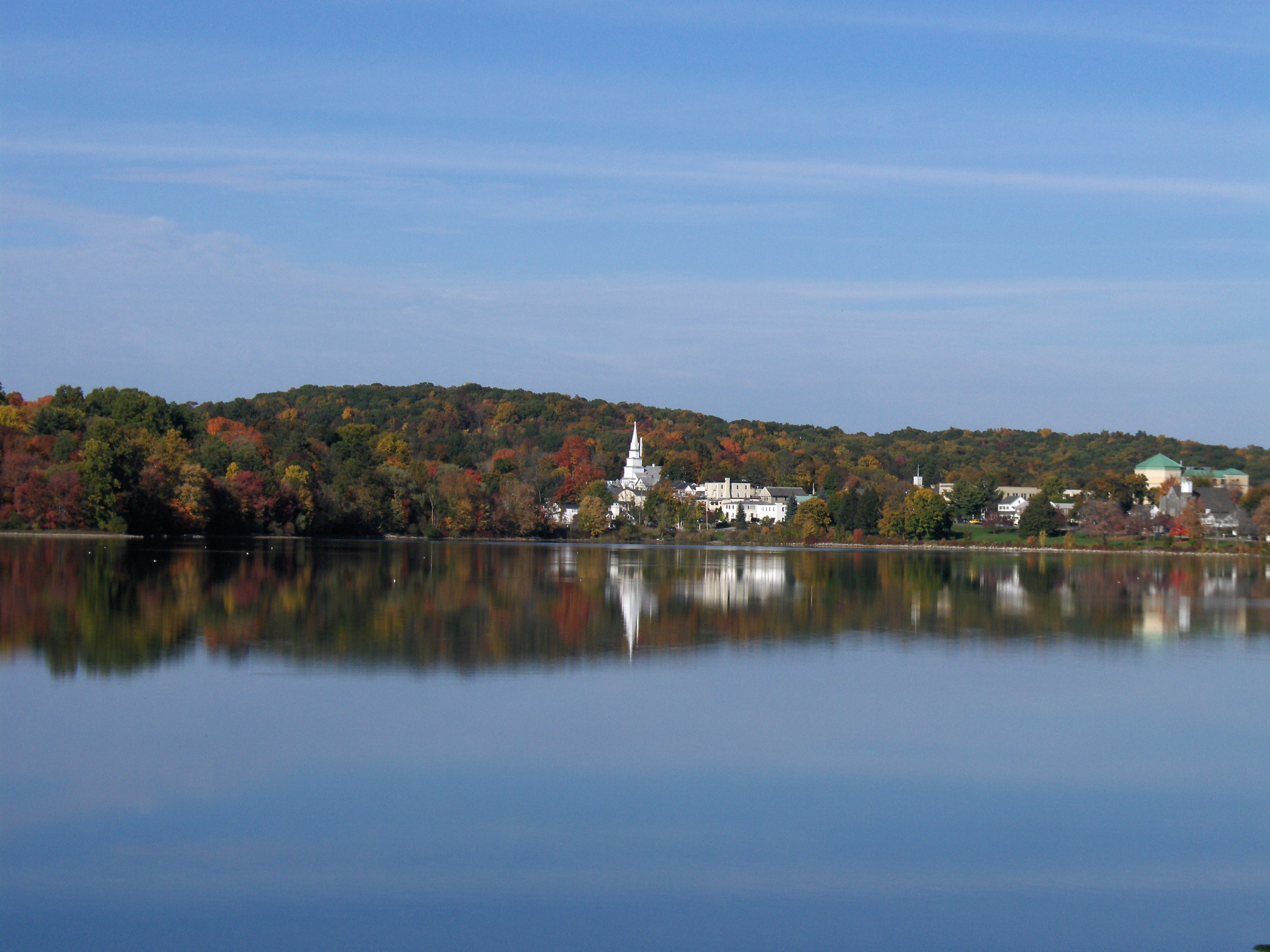
- Carmel Hamlet seen from Lake Gleneida to the west

- Seal

- Location of Carmel in New York state
- Coordinates: 41°23′24″N 73°43′26″W
- Country: United States
- State: New York
- County: Putnam
- Named for: Likely Mount Carmel

Area
  - Total: 40.69 sq mi (105.39 km^{2})
  - Land: 35.91 sq mi (93.00 km^{2})
  - Water: 4.79 sq mi (12.40 km^{2}) 11.26%
- Elevation: 617 ft (188 m)

Population (2020)
  - Total: 33,576
- Time zone: UTC-5 (Eastern (EST))
  - Summer (DST): UTC-4 (EDT)
- ZIP code(s): 10512 & 10541
- Area code: 845
- FIPS code: 36-12529
- GNIS feature ID: 978793
- Website: Town of Carmel

Carmel (pronounced /ˈkɑːrməl/) is a town in and the county seat of Putnam County, New York, United States. As of the 2020 United States census, the town had a population of 33,576.

The Town of Carmel is on the southern border of Putnam County, abutting Westchester County, approximately 50 miles (80 km) north of New York City and 10 miles (16 km) west of Danbury, Connecticut. It has no incorporated villages, although the hamlets of Carmel and Mahopac each have populations sizable enough to be considered villages.

== History ==
The town of Carmel was originally inhabited by Indians of the Wappinger people, who, in 1691, sold the property to Dutch traders. In 1697, a wealthy New York merchant, Adolphus Philipse, purchased their deed and was granted a patent from King William III of England for the entire tract of land which is now Putnam County. The town was settled around 1740 by George Hughson.

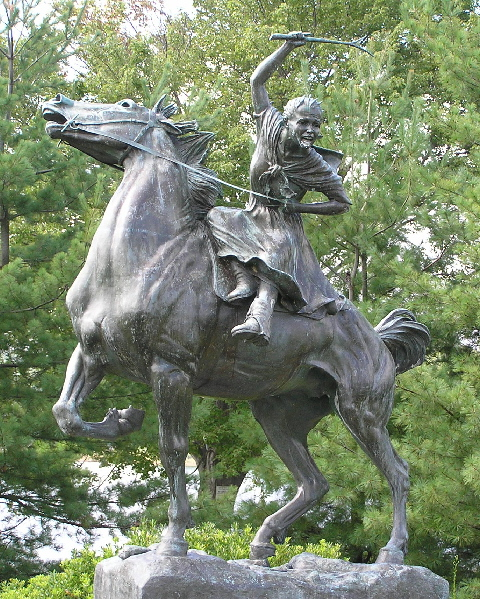
The statue of Sybil Ludington on Gleneida Avenue

Carmel was formed with Franklin town from part of Frederick town on March 17, 1795, while still a part of Dutchess County. (Franklin was renamed Patterson April 6, 1808. Frederick changed its name to Kent April 15, 1817.) Carmel was transferred to Putnam County when Dutchess County was split to form Putnam County in 1812 and Carmel was designated the county seat. In 1861, a small part of Carmel was taken to be added to the town of Putnam Valley.

A statue memorializing Sybil Ludington sits alongside Lake Gleneida. At the age of 16, she is said to have ridden all night to alert troops on April 26, 1777 that the British were coming. A 2015 report in The New England Quarterly says there is little evidence backing the story, and whether the ride occurred has been questioned since at least 1956.

=== Putnam County Court House ===
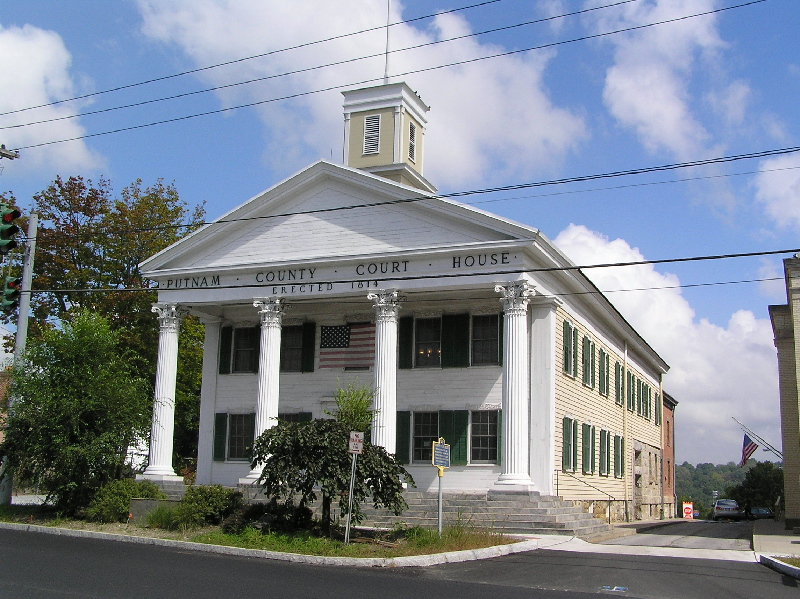
The original 1814 Putnam County Courthouse

The historic Putnam County Court House (Note: This building has lettering on the front "PUTNAM COUNTY COURT HOUSE" (two words) while the new structure is identified on its front as "PUTNAM COUNTY COURTHOUSE" (single word); in practice the older building is referred to as "the Historic Courthouse".) was built in 1814. It is the second oldest working courthouse in New York State. General James Townsend, of Carmel, was the architect. A landmark on Gleneida Avenue in Carmel, the building has a classical front facade. There was one hanging there in 1844. A jail was added in 1855. A new Putnam County Courthouse was completed in early 2008, located nearby on Gleneida Avenue.

=== Significant events ===
- December 4, 1965 – A Trans World Airlines Boeing 707 en route to San Francisco collided with an Eastern Airlines Lockheed Constellation flight in mid-air, killing four people.
- July 29, 1971 – A category F-2 tornado 1.9 miles (3.1 km) away from the town center caused between $50,000 and $500,000 in damages.
- October 22, 1974 – A large row of businesses on Gleneida Avenue was destroyed in a fire that required over 200 volunteer firefighters to fight the blaze.
- September 1982 – June 1983 – Carmel High School track star Mike Stahr was ranked first in the US for the mile run, losing only one high school track race during his junior and senior year. He set state records and was the Millrose Games mile winner two years in a row.
- July 10, 1989 – A F-2 (max. wind speeds 113–157 mph) tornado 0.7 miles (1.1 km) away from the Carmel town center traveled east across Fair Street near the King's Grant condos, injuring five people and causing between $5 million and $50 million in damages.
- September 11, 2001 – eight Carmel residents died in the September 11 attacks. The town has a memorial dedicated at Spain-Cornerstone Park on the corner of Fair Street and Route 52.
- April 27–28, 2007 – The Town of Carmel hosted a two-day Revolutionary War era militia encampment along Lake Gleneida. The event celebrated the 230th anniversary of the ride of Sybil Ludington.

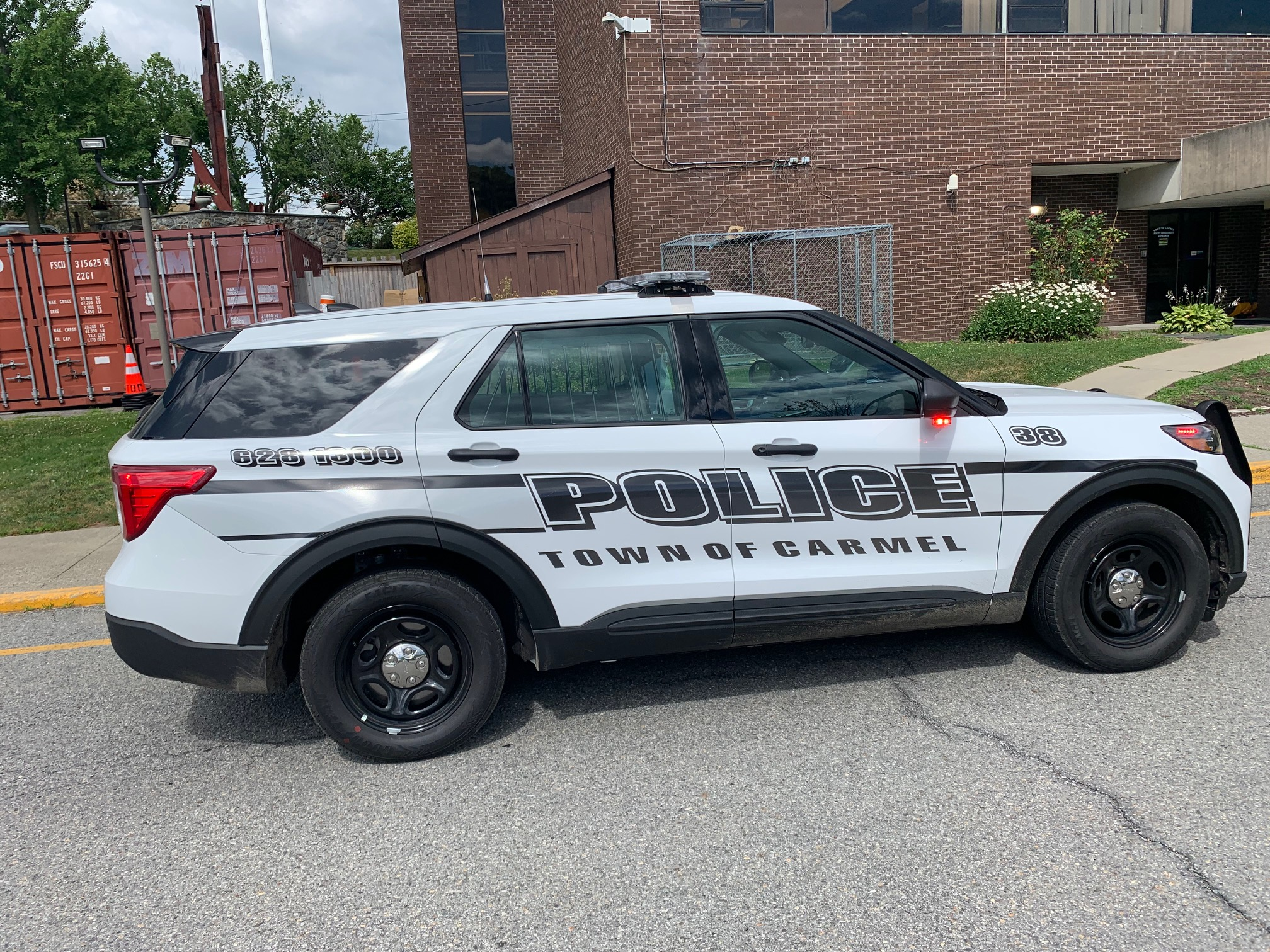
Carmel Police Department patrol vehicle

== Government ==
Carmel is governed by a Town Supervisor and the Town Board. The Carmel Town Hall is located at 60 McAlpin Avenue in Mahopac.

=== Emergency services ===
Law enforcement is primarily handled by the Town of Carmel Police Department, supplemented by the Putnam County Sheriff's Office and the New York State Police.

Fire protection services are provided by the Carmel Fire Department, Croton Falls Fire District, Mahopac Volunteer Fire Department, and Mahopac Falls Volunteer Fire Department.

Emergency medical services are provided to the town based on nature and location of emergency. Basic life support ambulance service is provided by Carmel Volunteer Ambulance Corps, Mahopac Volunteer Fire Department, Mahopac Falls Volunteer Fire Department, and North Salem Volunteer Ambulance Corps. Advanced life support ambulance and first response service is provided by Empress Ambulance under contract by Putnam County Bureau of Emergency Services.

== Education ==
The Town of Carmel is served primarily by two school districts: Carmel Central School District and Mahopac Central School District. Smaller portions of the town are in Lakeland Central School District, North Salem Central School District, and Brewster Central School District.

=== Carmel Central School District ===
Carmel Central School District encompasses 85 square miles and serves approximately 5000 students from six different towns. The district enrolls students from the town of Kent, as well as parts of the towns of Carmel, Putnam Valley, Patterson, Southeast and East Fishkill.

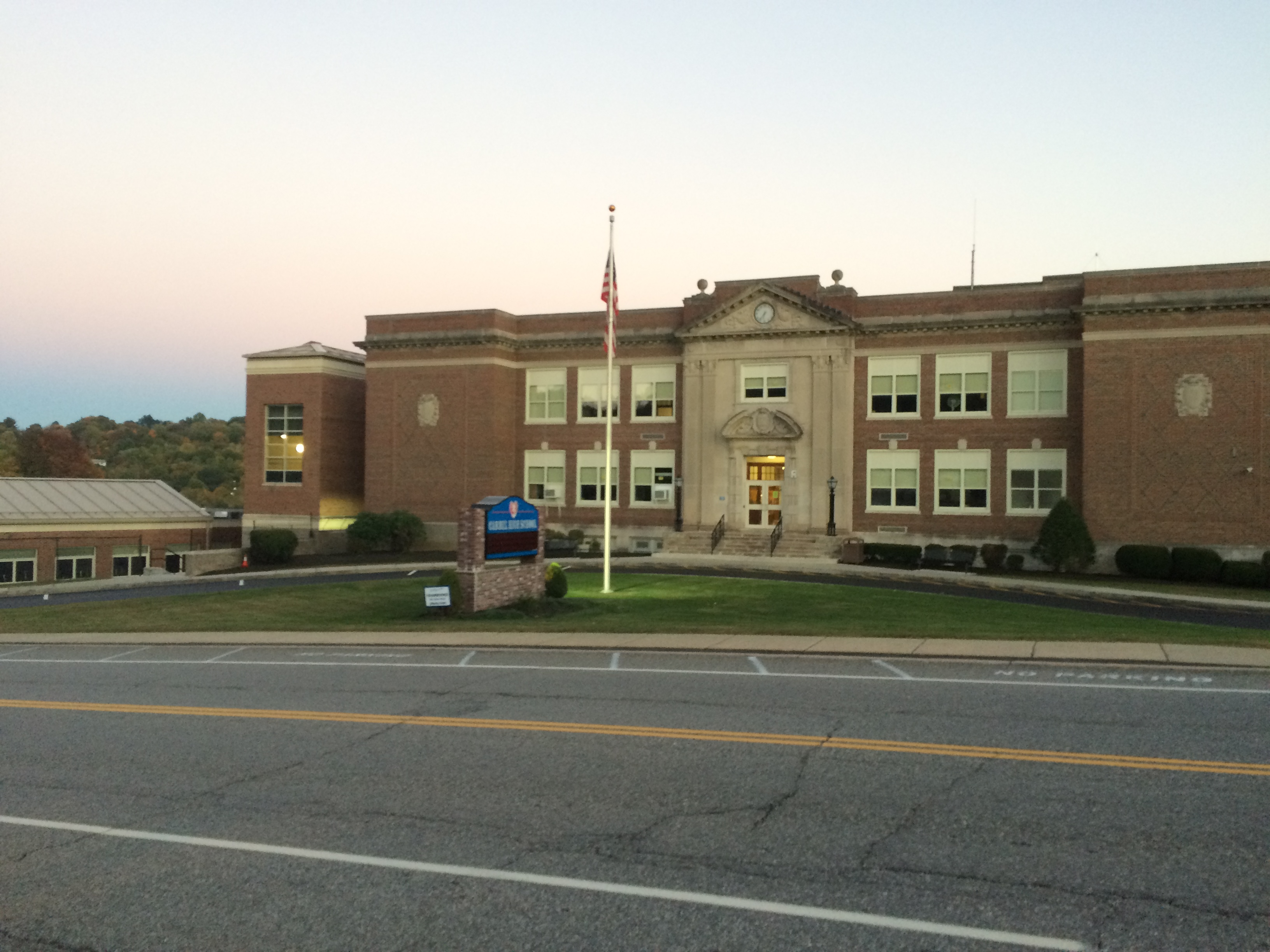
Carmel High School

George Fischer Middle School is Carmel's primary middle school. Built in 1963, it was named after a former school board member, George F. Fischer. It contains a large number of students (1,000+), and contains grades 5–8. It is notable for its music program.

Constructed in 1929, Carmel High School, which serves 1,843 students, is located on Fair Street across the street from the post office in the heart of town. The original building had four additions, including one built in 1936 with money from the New Deal, one in 1969, one in 1980, and one in 2007, which holds science classrooms and a library.

St. James the Apostle is a Catholic elementary school in Carmel that opened in 1954.

=== Mahopac Central School District ===
Mahopac Central School District has 6 public schools serving 4,132 students in Mahopac, New York.

It is divided into five schools: three K-5 schools (Lakeview Elementary School, Fulmar Road Elementary School, and Austin Road Elementary School), a middle school for grades 6–8 (Mahopac Middle School) and a high school for grades 9–12 (Mahopac High School). A nursery school is operated by the district at the Mahopac Falls school.

Historically, Mahopac had five one-room school houses that were united into one central school (now Lakeview Elementary School) in 1935.

St. John the Evangelist was a Catholic elementary school in Mahopac from 1955 until its closing in 2011. The school building remains with the active Church across the street from Lake Mahopac.

== Geography ==
According to the United States Census Bureau, the town has a total area of 40.7 square miles (105 km^{2}) (88.74%), of which 36.1 square miles (93 km^{2}) is land and 4.6 square miles (12 km^{2}) is water (11.26%).

The southern town line is the border of Westchester County, adjacent to Somers and the Town of Yorktown. The town is located approximately 50 miles (80 km) north of New York City (measured from Central Park) and approximately 10 miles (16 km) west of Danbury, Connecticut.

=== Notable sites and organizations ===
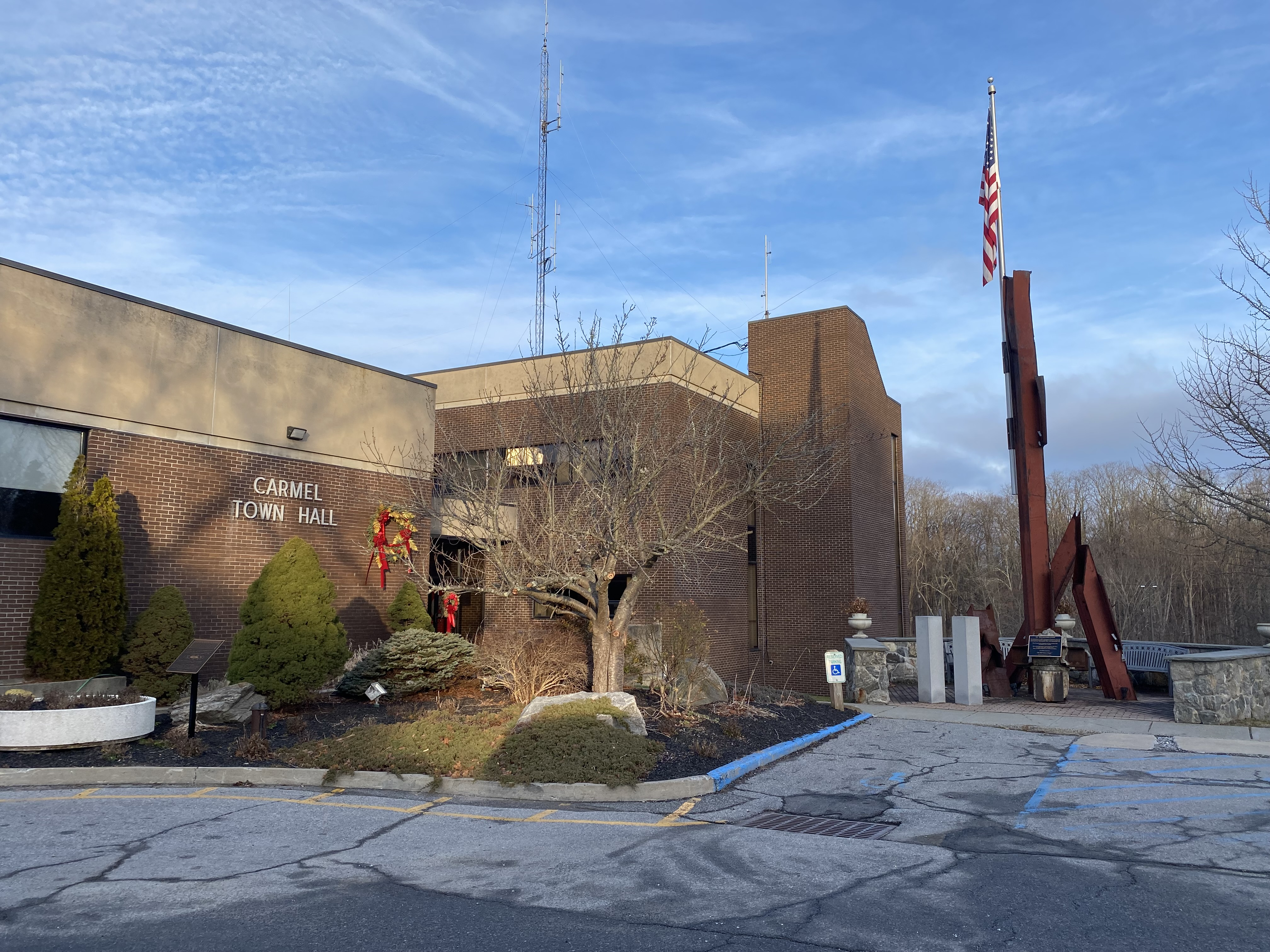
Carmel Town Hall

- Gilead Cemetery
- Putnam Hospital Center — a 164-bed not-for-profit acute care hospital on Stoneleigh Avenue, which opened in 1964.
- Reed Memorial Library

=== Communities and locations in Carmel ===
- Carmel – A hamlet in the northeastern corner of the town and home to the seat of Putnam County.
- Baldwin Place – A hamlet at the junction of US 6 and NY 118.
- Carmel Hills – A hamlet south of Carmel village.
- Crafts – once a hamlet of Carmel with its own post office, off Drewville Road, south of Route 6, named after the Craft Family, descendants of Pilgrims.
- Field Corners –
- Hopkins Corners –
- Houseman Corners –
- Ludington –
- Mahopac – A hamlet in the southern half the town where the municipal government is located.
- Mahopac Falls – A hamlet in the southwestern corner of the town.
- Mahopac Mines – Abandoned mines on the eastern side of town near the old Ames building.
- Mahopac Point – A former private community on Lake Mahopac
- Mahopac Golf Club – Located on the north side of Lake Mahopac is an 18-hole private golf and beach club.
- Rock Hill Camp – A Girl Scout camp opened in 1922, located in Mahopac on Long Pond.
- Thompkins Corners –
- Secor Corners –
- Stillwater – A hamlet in the southwestern corner of the town.
- Tilly Foster – A hamlet southeast of Carmel village near the eastern town line.

== Demographics ==
Historical population
Census	Pop.	Note	%±
2000	33,006		—
2010	34,305		3.9%
2020	33,576		−2.1%
U.S. Decennial Census

- Total Population: 33,196
- Males, 49.0%; Females – 51.0%
- Median Age: 40.1 years
- By Race
  - White, 90.5%
  - Hispanic (of any race), 8.0%
  - Asian, 3.0%
  - Black or African American, 1.0%
  - Other Race, 2.7%
- Average Household Size: 2.99
- Median Household Income: $105,406 (2015)
- Per Capita Income: $42,034 (2015)
- High School Graduation Rate: 94.1%
- College Graduation Rate: 42.1%

Source: US Census

== Notable people ==
- Lou Albano, "Captain Lou" (1933–2009), professional wrestler/manager
- Nancy Allen, (born 1950), classical harpist
- William Francis Bailey, (1842–1915), Wisconsin politician and judge
- Amedee J. Van Beuren, (1879–1938), film producer
- Leo Burmester, (1944–2007), stage and television actor
- Daniel Drew, (1797–1879), businessman, developer and financier
- Dave Fleming, “Mr. Mahopac", (born 1969), professional baseball pitcher
- Daniel Gutman (1901–1993), lawyer, state senator, state assemblyman, president justice of the municipal court, and law school dean.
- Frederick M. Kelley (1822–1905), banker and engineer
- Ryan Kelly (born 1991), professional basketball player for the Houston Rockets
- Lisa Lane, (1933–2024), 1959 U.S. Women's Chess Champion
- Larry Laoretti, (born 1939), professional golfer
- Lewis Ludington, (1786–1857), businessman, lumber baron, and real estate developer
- Bob May, (1939–2009) actor and stuntman, best remembered for playing The Robot on the 1965–68 television series Lost in Space
- Caleb McLaughlin, (born 2001), actor, star of Stranger Things
- Jim Ryan, (born 1939) former Good Day New York anchor
- Sabrina Vega (born 1995), USA Gymnastics Senior National Team member
