= Lake Gleneida =

Lake of the United States of America

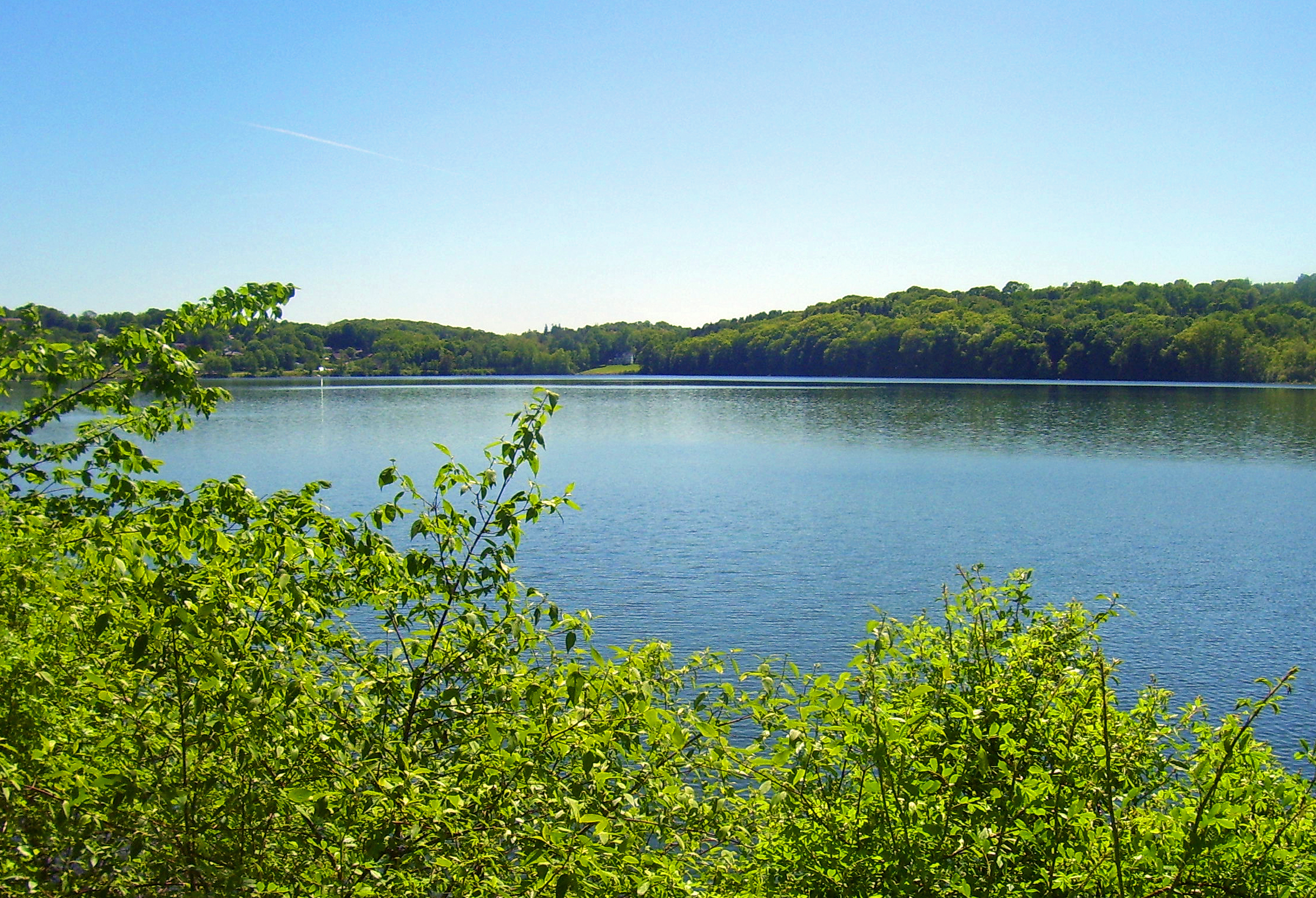
- From east shore, looking south

- Location within New York Location within the United States
- Location: Carmel, New York
- Coordinates: 41°25′12″N 73°41′00″W
- Type: reservoir
- Catchment area: 313.6 acres (126.9 ha)
- Basin countries: United States
- Max. length: 3,500 ft (1,100 m)
- Max. width: 2,000 ft (610 m)
- Surface area: 168 acres (68 ha)
- Average depth: 48 ft (15 m)
- Max. depth: 108 ft (33 m)
- Water volume: 8,042 acre⋅ft (9,920,000 m^{3})
- Surface elevation: 505 ft (154 m)

Lake Gleneida is a controlled lake in the hamlet of Carmel within the Town of Carmel in central Putnam County, New York. Originally a smaller natural water body, Shaw's Pond, it was dammed by New York City in 1870 and enlarged to 168 acres (68 ha) for inclusion in its water supply system. It is part of the New York City water system's Croton Watershed.

== Geography ==
The roughly heart-shaped lake is immediately to the southwest of downtown Carmel. It is surrounded by grassy parkland sloping down to the lake from the roads on the south and east, and woods on the other sides. NY 301 follows the north shore, ascending to its eastern terminus at NY 52 across from the Putnam County courthouse. Route 52 follows the eastern shore for a short distance to the south of this intersection before it, too, ends at US 6, which continues around the southern shore. There is no road along the western side, although a local street, Glenvue Drive, traverses the top of the 545-foot-high (166 m) ridge there.

The lake fills a small depression in the middle of a hilly area. Its bottom continues its rapid drop from the shoreline, reaching a depth of slightly over 100 feet (30 m) in the middle of the lake, equivalent to the surface of a swampy depression to its east. Mean depth is 48 feet (15 m). It typically contains 8,000 acre-feet (9,900,000 m^{3}), or 2.6 billion US gallons (9,800,000 m^{3}) of water.

There are no inlet brooks. A dam and spillway are located on its northwest end, with outflow draining into the New York City water supply system's West Branch Reservoir, where it joins with waters from the Delaware Aqueduct. Water in excess of New York City's needs there goes over its spillway and into the West Branch Croton River, which is captured downstream by the Croton Falls Reservoir.

== History ==
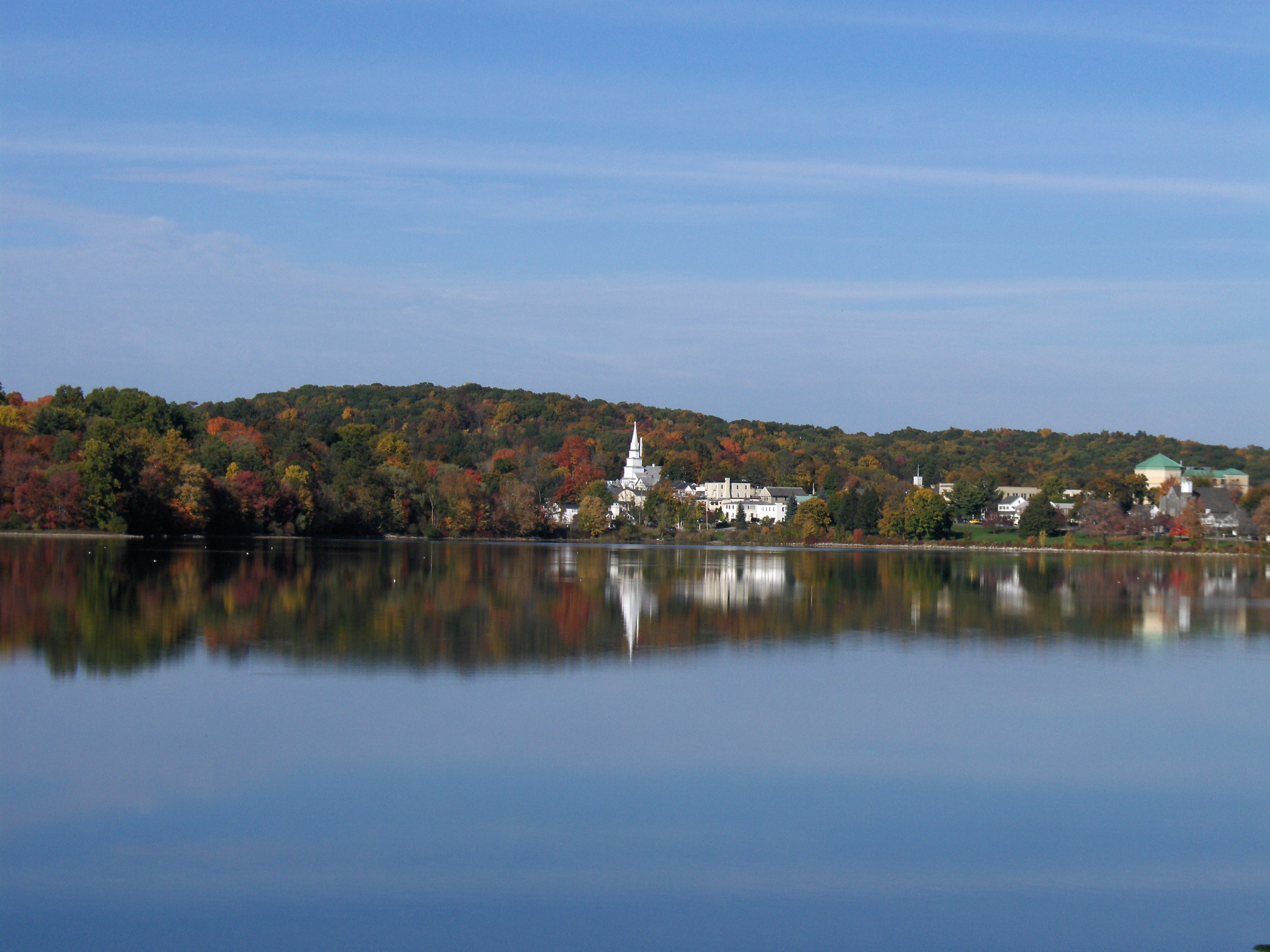
The hamlet of Carmel seen across Lake Glendeida from the west

The lake was originally known as Shaw's Pond, after an early landowner. It had been a part of the Carmel landscape since the hamlet's designation as county seat upon Putnam's 1812 creation. It quickly became a popular spot for boating and fishing.

The name started appearing on maps around 1840. Not long after, residents became dissatisfied with the name and proposed grander names for it. In 1852, a committee of local residents finally settled on Lake Gleneida. New York City bought rights to the lake around 1895 and tore down what houses were built near it.

== Recreation ==
The New York City Department of Environmental Protection (DEP) owns Lake Gleneida, considered one of three controlled lakes in the city's water system. This allows DEP to withdraw water as a right of ownership.

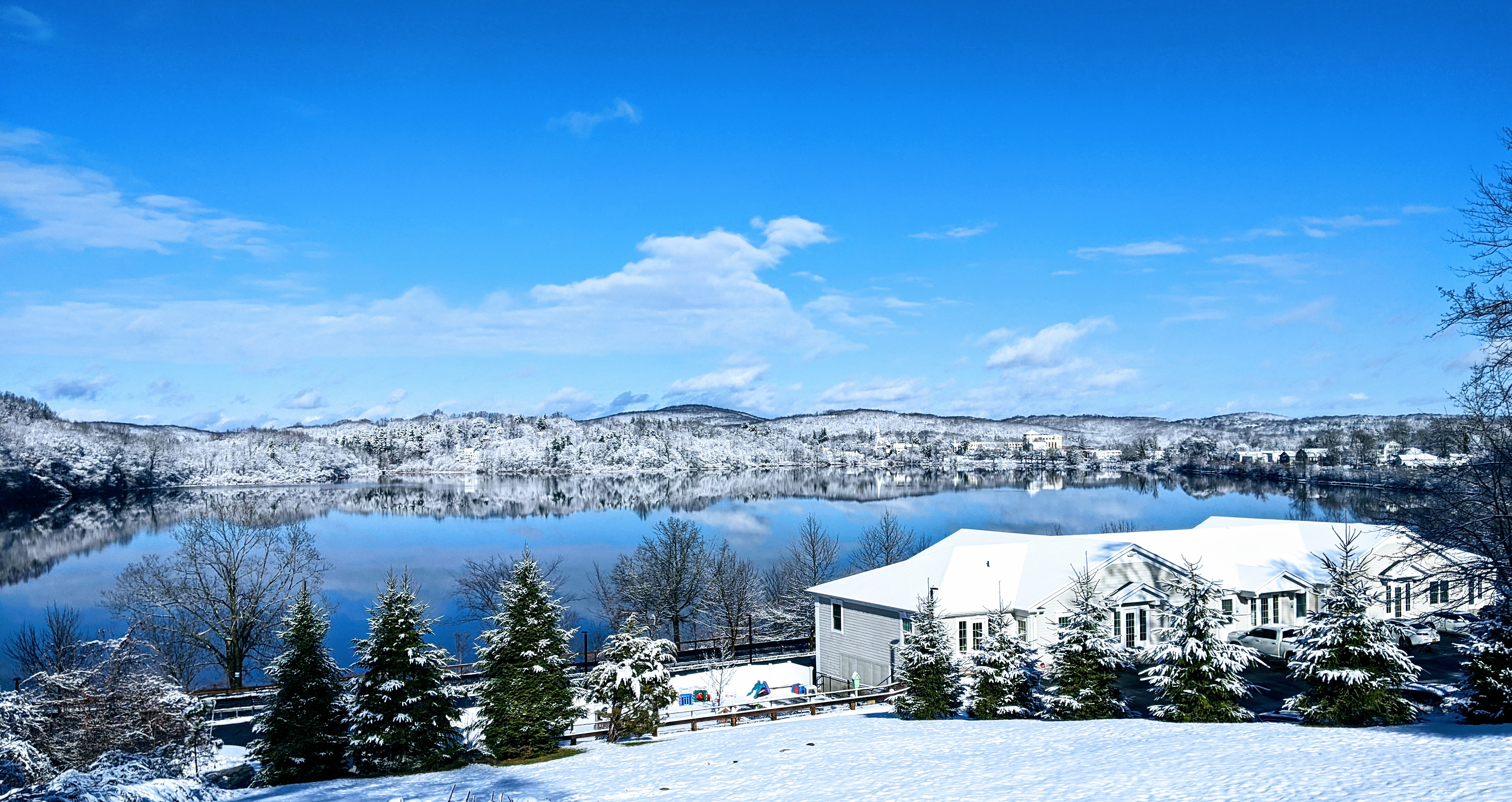
Lake Gleneida in winter, from the west

Recreational use of the lake falls under DEP regulations. Fishing, ice fishing and boating are allowed with a valid DEP permit and New York State Department of Environmental Conservation-issued fishing license. Swimming is not permitted.

Boats used in the lake may not be used in any other body of water, to prevent the spread of zebra mussels. This raised some local concern in 2005, since many were left on shore during the offseason and the town of Carmel found them unsightly as it prepared to spend $2.3 million to spruce up the hamlet. DEP was able to get most of the owners to relocate them to storage areas out of sight of downtown.
