= Mahopac Central School District =

School district in the U.S. state of New York

Mahopac Central School District is a school district headquartered in Mahopac, New York.

== History ==
Circa 2014 superintendent Thomas J. Manko left his position. The Mahopac school board selected Forest City Regional School District superintendent John Kopicki as the successor, but Kopicki chose not to take the position.

Anthony DiCarlo became the superintendent in 2018. He formerly served as a principal in the New Rochelle School District. Following his retirement in 2022, Christine Tona took over as superintendent. She stepped down from her role in August 2025, terminating her contract nearly a year-and-a-half earlier than originally anticipated, leaving the district with Frank Miele as interim superintendent.

== Schools ==
Secondary

- Mahopac High School
- Mahopac Middle School
- Mahopac Falls Academy (alternative middle school)

Primary

- Austin Road Elementary School
- Fulmar Road Elementary School
- Lakeview Elementary School
- Mahopac Falls Academy (also has preschools on campus)

== Scandals ==
=== 2014 racism incident ===
At a high school basketball game, Mahopac students and spectators were accused of verbally attacking basketball players from Mount Vernon, New York, with "racial taunts of an abhorrent nature." After eventually losing the game, Mahopac students then took to Twitter to continue the harassment, specifically focusing their attacks towards African-American students. Once word began to spread of the incident, students from other school districts began to support the statements made by Mount Vernon, citing similar issues with Mahopac students. Upon investigation, 3 Mahopac students were suspended. As a result of the incident, Mahopac's varsity basketball coach at the time, Kevin Downes, stepped down from his position.

=== 2019 racism incident ===
Similar to the incident in 2014, Mahopac High School junior varsity lacrosse players were accused of racist behaviors during a game against the team from New Rochelle, New York. A parent of a New Rochelle athlete reported that Mahopac athletes referred to the New Rochelle athletes as "[expletive] Mexicans" and that they refused to shake hands with African-American athletes. Mahopac's Superintendent, Anthony DiCarlo, immediately got in touch with New Rochelle administrators about the incident, responding to the accusations by stating, "We must be ever-vigilant when confronting behavior that runs counter to expected norms...Anyone found responsible will be held accountable in accordance with district policies and procedures." However, no disciplinary action was taken after extensive reviews by both school districts found the reports to be unfounded.

=== 2019 mascot controversy ===
In October 2019, Daniel Ehrenpreis, a 2012 Mahopac alumnus and Johns Hopkins University public health graduate, began a petition seeking to retire the Mahopac School District's "Indian" mascot. Current Mahopac High School students and alumni of subsequently signed in support. However, within days, a counter-petition circulated underscoring the significance of the mascot, originally selected to honor the Mahopac band of the Wappinger people native to the community.

After listening to arguments from both sides, the school district chose to keep the mascot, stating that they "determined that the Mahopac Indian was an appropriate symbol of pride, as it honored the Algonquin Indians who inhabited Mahopac long before any of us."

The matter was reopened in June 2020, after students again petitioned the school district to not only retire the mascot but also address ongoing racial issues prevalent in the schools. On June 18, several residents sought to express concerns pertaining to the school mascot during a virtual school board meeting. However, despite submitting questions before the deadline, the topic was never brought up by either school officials or board members.

District Superintendent Anthony DiCarlo subsequently posted a letter expressing the board's position:

"The Board appreciates the outreach, research, and advocacy that Mr. Ehrenpreis has conducted with regard to the issue of the District's mascot.

The District met with Mr. Ehrenpreis (via skype) in December 2019, listened to his concerns, and considered the facts and argument that he (and his colleagues) had advanced regarding their desire to change the mascot.

The District then conducted its own historical investigation into the origins of the mascot.

The first inhabitants of the land that is today Mahopac were members of the Algonquin people. In addition, the District had previously been advised by the town historian that descendants of the Algonquin people in fact appreciated and took great pride in the District using the nickname and did not want the District to abandon its use.

The District ultimately determined that it would, accordingly, maintain the mascot." During a Jan. 17 Board of Education work session, Tona unveiled a plan for the district to choose a new mascot name by June 30, with full implementation no later than June 30, 2025.

"While I have not been in the Mahopac community for very long, I know that the Mahopac Indians mascot has been a longstanding tradition used to recognize the indigenous people who have lived in our beautiful community long before all of us,” Tona stated. Our objective is to select a new mascot that embodies the Mahopac spirit, provides school district recognition, and invokes pride and enthusiasm,” she added".

The Mahopac School District is one of about 2,000 school districts nationwide, and of about 60 in New York as of 2023, that still use a Native American as a mascot. This caused conflict with the New York state officials, who have threatened to withhold state aid for any school district that may be in "willful violation" of the Dignity For All Students Act.

=== 2026 Board of Education Controversy ===
In 2026, the Mahopac Central School District became the focus of controversy after it was revealed that one of the Board of Education trustees, Christopher Harrigan, was actively employed as a deportation officer with U.S. Immigration and Customs Enforcement (ICE). Local immigration-advocacy groups and residents in Putnam County raised concerns about what they described as his participation in ICE enforcement activities, including arrests, and argued that his role with ICE created a conflict of interest with his position overseeing the district. Critics mobilized ahead of a January 22, 2026, board meeting, alleging that Harrigan’s employment could intimidate families and undermine trust in the school system.

At the board meeting, tensions ran high as some community members called for Harrigan’s resignation, questioning the appropriateness of having an ICE agent on the school board and voicing fears about student and family safety. However, a significant portion of attendees, along with Board of Education leadership, strongly supported Harrigan’s continued service. Board President Michael Mongon emphasized that New York state law did not disqualify him from serving and stated the board would not pursue his removal. Other trustees and residents defended Harrigan, arguing that his outside employment should not be “weaponized” against him and praising his work for the community. Despite the calls for resignation, Harrigan reiterated that he would not step down, and the board declined to take action to remove him.
