= Hoyte =

Hoyte is a surname. Notable people with the surname include:

- Desmond Hoyte (1929–2002), Guyanese politician, Prime Minister of Guyana from 1984 to 1985 and President of Guyana from 1985 until 1992
- Gavin Hoyte (born 1990), Trinidadian footballer
- James Hoyte (fl. 1985–?), Fijian footballer
- Jason Hoyte (fl. 1996–present), New Zealand actor
- John Hoyte (1835–1913), British painter
- Justin Hoyte (born 1984), British former footballer
- Lenon Hoyte (1905–1999), American doll collector
- Oliver Hoyte (born 1984), American former football player
- Ricky Hoyte (born 1969), West Indian former cricketer
- Trevor Hoyte (athlete) (born 1957), English former sprinter
- Trevor Hoyte (Canadian football) (born 1998), Canadian football player
- Wendy Hoyte (born 1957), British former sprinter

== See also ==
- Hoyt (disambiguation)
- Hoit (disambiguation)
