= Hoyt =

Hoyt may refer to:

== Places ==
=== Canada ===
- Hoyt, New Brunswick

=== United States ===
- Hoyt, Colorado
- Hoyt, Kansas
- Hoyt, West Virginia
- Hoyt, Wisconsin
- Hoyt Peak, a mountain in Yellowstone National Park, Wyoming

== Other uses ==
- Hoyt (name), including a list of people and fictional characters with the given name or surname
- Hoyt Archery, an American bow manufacturer

== See also ==
- Hoyt model, for urban land use
- Hoyt Street (disambiguation), stations of the New York City Subway in Brooklyn
- Hoyts, an Australian group of companies
- Hoit (disambiguation)
- Hoyte, a list of people with the surname or given name
