= Highland, New York =

Highland is the name of two places in the U.S. state of New York:

- Highland, Sullivan County, New York, a town
- Highland, Ulster County, New York, an unincorporated hamlet in the town of Lloyd

== See also ==
- Highland Falls, New York, a village on the eastern end of Orange County
- Highland Mills, New York, a hamlet in central Orange County
- Highlands, New York, a town in Orange County containing Highlands Falls
