= Highland Falls-Fort Montgomery Central School District =

School district in New York State, USA

Highland Falls-Fort Montgomery Central School District (HFFMCSD) is a school district headquartered in Highland Falls, New York.

== History ==
After 1997 the district educated students at Saint Basil Academy in Garrison after that institution stopped in-house instruction. In 2003, Highland Falls-Fort Montgomery stopped allowing St. Basil students to attend classes at Highland Falls-Fort Montgomery because St. Basil was not paying tuition for the students. Saint Basil had failed to pay $237,000 to HFFMCSD. In 2004 the New York State Education Department decided that in the meantime, the Garrison Union Free School District (which sends high school students to Highland Falls-Fort Montgomery) would be the school district for Saint Basil Academy students who originated from households residing in New York State, although the Garrison district operated in a manner that the order did not require them to pay for the education of high school students.

Frank Sheboy began his term as superintendent circa 2015.

In 2021 the agency at West Point announced that the bid to educate West Point High School students would be competitive. In March 2022 the O'Neill contract was renewed.

In 2022 Sheboy decided to leave his position.

== Service area ==
The district includes most of the town of Highlands and portions of the town of Woodbury. It includes the village of Highland Falls and the hamlets of Fort Montgomery and West Point. HFFMCSD's James I. O'Neill High School is one of two high schools taking students from the Garrison Union Free School District (GUFSD) as that district only educates up to 8th grade and pays to send its students elsewhere for high school. GUFSD includes sections of Philipstown and Putnam Valley towns, with the former portion including Garrison hamlet. United States Military Academy sends high school aged students who are dependents of on-base military personnel to O'Neill under contract.

== Schools ==
- James I. O'Neill High School
- Highland Falls Intermediate School
- Fort Montgomery Elementary School
