= Hoyt (name) =

Hoyt is an English medieval surname, sometimes used as a given name. It is a topographical surname for someone who lived high, or on a hill.

== People ==
=== Given name ===
- Hoyt Axton (1938–1999), American country singer
- Hoyt Curtin (1922–2000), American composer
- Hoyt Ming (1902–1985), American old-time fiddler
- Hoyt Richards (1962), American model and actor
- Hoyt Sherman (1827–1904), American banker
- Hoyt Patrick Taylor (1890–1964), American politician
- Hoyt Patrick Taylor Jr. (1924–2018), American politician
- Hoyt Vandenberg (1899–1954), U.S. Air Force general
- Hoyt Wilhelm (1922–2002), American hall of fame baseball pitcher
- Hoyt Richard "Dick" Murdoch (1946–1996), American professional wrestler

=== Surname ===
- Adelia M. Hoyt (1865–1966), American librarian, author, and advocate for blind people
- Beatrix Hoyt (1880–1963), American amateur golfing champion
- Clegg Hoyt (1910–1967), American film and television actor
- Colgate Hoyt (1849–1922), American businessman
- Daniel Hoyt (1681–1764), member of the House of Representatives of the Colony of Connecticut (1734)
- Dick and Rick Hoyt, Team Hoyt American duo, with Dick pushing, pulling or carrying his son Rick, who has cerebral palsy, in athletic competitions
- Ed Hoyt (1900–1972), American politician from Nebraska
- Edith Hoyt (1894–1971), American painter
- Elizabeth Ellis Hoyt (1893–1980), American economist
- Erich Hoyt (born 1950), American-Canadian author and conservationist
- Garry Hoyt (1931–2025), American and Puerto Rican sailor
- George Henry Hoyt (1837–1877), American attorney who defended John Brown (abolitionist)
- Homer Hoyt (1895–1984), American economist
- Huested W. R. Hoyt (1842–1894), American politician
- James Henry Hoyt (1809–1873), American railroad entrepreneur and member of the Connecticut Senate from 1857 to 1858
- James Hoyt (baseball) (born 1986), American major league baseball pitcher
- Jesse Hoyt (1792–1867), New York politician
- John Hoyt (1905–1991), American actor
- John Philo Hoyt (1841–1926), Governor of Arizona Territory (1877-8) and Justice of the Washington Supreme Court (1889-97)
- John Wesley Hoyt (1831–1910), Territorial Governor of Wyoming (1878−1882)
- LaMarr Hoyt (1955–2021), American baseball player
- Lance Hoyt (born 1977), American professional wrestler
- Martha Seavey Hoyt, American biographer, newspaper correspondent, businesswoman
- Matt Hoyt, American film director
- Nicholas Hoyt (1620-?), British member of the Connecticut General Assembly (1673)
- Norris Hoyt, (1935-2013), American lawyer and politician
- Oliver Hoyt (1823–1887), American politician
- Ryan Hoyt (born 1979), American murderer
- Sam Hoyt (born 1962), American politician
- Sarah Hoyt (born 1962), Portuguese-American award-winning fiction writer
- Waite Hoyt (1899–1984), American hall of Fame baseball pitcher
- Walter Hoyt (1618–1698), founding settler of Norwalk, Connecticut
- William Hoyt (disambiguation), several people
- Zack Hoyt (born 1990), American content creator

== Fictional characters ==
- Charles Hoyt, a fictional serial killer in the television series Rizzoli & Isles
- Emma Hoyt, girlfriend of Gerry Bertier in Remember the Titans played by Kate Bosworth
- Lenar Hoyt, Jesuit Priest from the Hyperion cantos
- Jake Hoyt, a detective in the movie Training Day portrayed by Ethan Hawke
- Jaz Hoyt, a Nazi biker on the HBO drama Oz
- Detective Woody Hoyt, on the show Crossing Jordan
- Sheriff Hoyt, portrayed by R. Lee Ermey in The Texas Chainsaw Massacre films
- Hoyt Fortenberry, on the HBO series True Blood
- Hoyt Platter, brother of Peggy Hill in King of the Hill
- Hoyt Thorpe, in Tom Wolfe's I am Charlotte Simmons
- Hoyt Volker, in the video game Far Cry 3
