= Fort Montgomery, New York =

- CDP
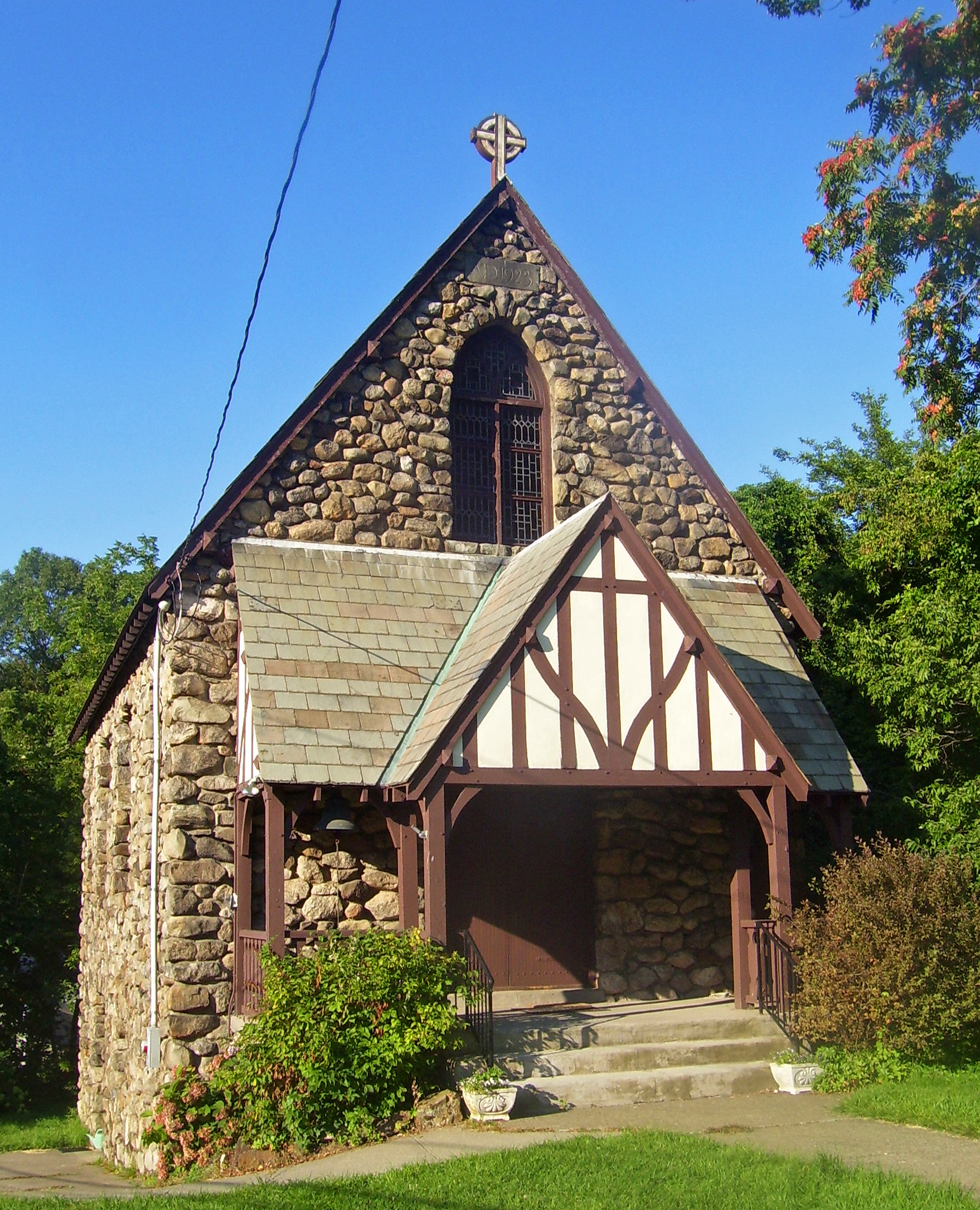
- St Mark's Episcopal Chapel

- Location in Orange County and the state of New York.

- Location within the state of New York
- Coordinates: 41°20′15″N 73°58′58″W
- Country: United States
- State: New York
- County: Orange

Area
  - Total: 1.87 sq mi (4.85 km^{2})
  - Land: 1.84 sq mi (4.77 km^{2})
  - Water: 0.031 sq mi (0.08 km^{2})
- Elevation: 161 ft (49 m)

Population (2020)
  - Total: 1,627
  - Density: 883.8/sq mi (341.23/km^{2})
- Time zone: UTC−5 (Eastern (EST))
  - Summer (DST): UTC−4 (EDT)
- ZIP Code: 10922
- Area code: 845
- FIPS code: 36-26902
- GNIS feature ID: 0950484

Fort Montgomery is a hamlet (and census-designated place) in Orange County, New York, United States. The population was 1,627 at the 2020 census. It is part of the Kiryas Joel–Poughkeepsie–Newburgh metropolitan area as well as the larger New York metropolitan area.

Fort Montgomery is in the southeastern corner of the town of Highlands, on U.S. Route 9W.

== Geography ==
Fort Montgomery is on the west bank of the Hudson River.

Fort Montgomery is located at 41°20′15″N 73°58′58″W (41.337469, -73.982746).

According to the United States Census Bureau, the CDP has a total area of 1.5 square miles (3.9 km^{2}), of which 1.5 square miles (3.9 km^{2}) is land and .04 square miles (0.10 km^{2}) (2%) is water.

== History ==
The town is named after the first Fort Montgomery, a fortification of the American Revolution stormed by the British on October 6, 1777. Although a loss for American forces, the battle delayed the British from sailing up the Hudson River in time to relieve Burgoyne's forces at Saratoga. After the fort's demolition, American defenses centered on West Point, New York, upriver, and the location was not re-used militarily.

The town subsequently became the site of a major ore dock. Ore from the Forest of Dean Mine was shipped via a railroad and an aerial tramway to the dock, where it was loaded into steamboats on the Hudson. Coal for the mine machinery travelled in the opposite direction. Some ore was also mined in the immediate vicinity of Fort Montgomery. The West Shore Railroad was constructed through the town in the early 1880s.

Local mining activity was relatively ephemeral, and the large Forest of Dean Mine was shut down in 1931. With the loss of its main industry, the town sank into decline, accelerated by the end of railroad passenger service in 1958.

Today, the hamlet is a well-known stop on the Appalachian Trail due to the close proximity to the trail of its post office, food, and lodging.

== Demographics ==
Historical population
Census	Pop.	Note	%±
2000	1,418		—
2010	1,571		10.8%
2020	1,627		3.6%
U.S. Decennial Census

As of the census of 2000, there were 1,418 people, 574 households, and 393 families residing in the CDP. The population density was 965 inhabitants per square mile (373/km^{2}). There were 611 housing units at an average density of 415.8 per square mile (160.5/km^{2}). The racial makeup of the CDP was 92.6% white, 1.76% African American, .71% Native American, .99% Asian, .14% Pacific Islander, 1.55% from other races, and 2.26% from two or more races. Hispanic or Latino of any race were 5.99% of the population. There were 574 households, out of which 31.7% had children under the age of 18 living with them, 57.3% were married couples living together, 7.1% had a female householder with no husband present, and 31.5% were non-families. 25.8% of all households were made up of individuals, and 7.8% had someone living alone who was 65 years of age or older. The average household size was 2.47 and the average family size was 3.

In the CDP, the population was spread out, with 23.6% under the age of 18, 5.3% from 18 to 24, 33.9% from 25 to 44, 25.4% from 45 to 64, and 11.8% who were 65 years of age or older. The median age was 38 years. For every 100 females, there were 98.9 males. For every 100 females age 18 and over, there were 100.7 males.

The median income for a household in the CDP was $62,578, and the median income for a family was $65,708. Males had a median income of $45,781 versus $36,146 for females. The per capita income for the CDP was $24,520. About 1.5% of families and 2.9% of the population were below the poverty line, including 3.9% of those under age 18 and none of those age 65 or over.

== Government ==
A portion of the West Point Military Reservation extends into the CDP.

== Education ==
Highland Falls-Fort Montgomery Central School District is the local school district. James I. O'Neill High School is its high school.
