= Garrison Union Free School =

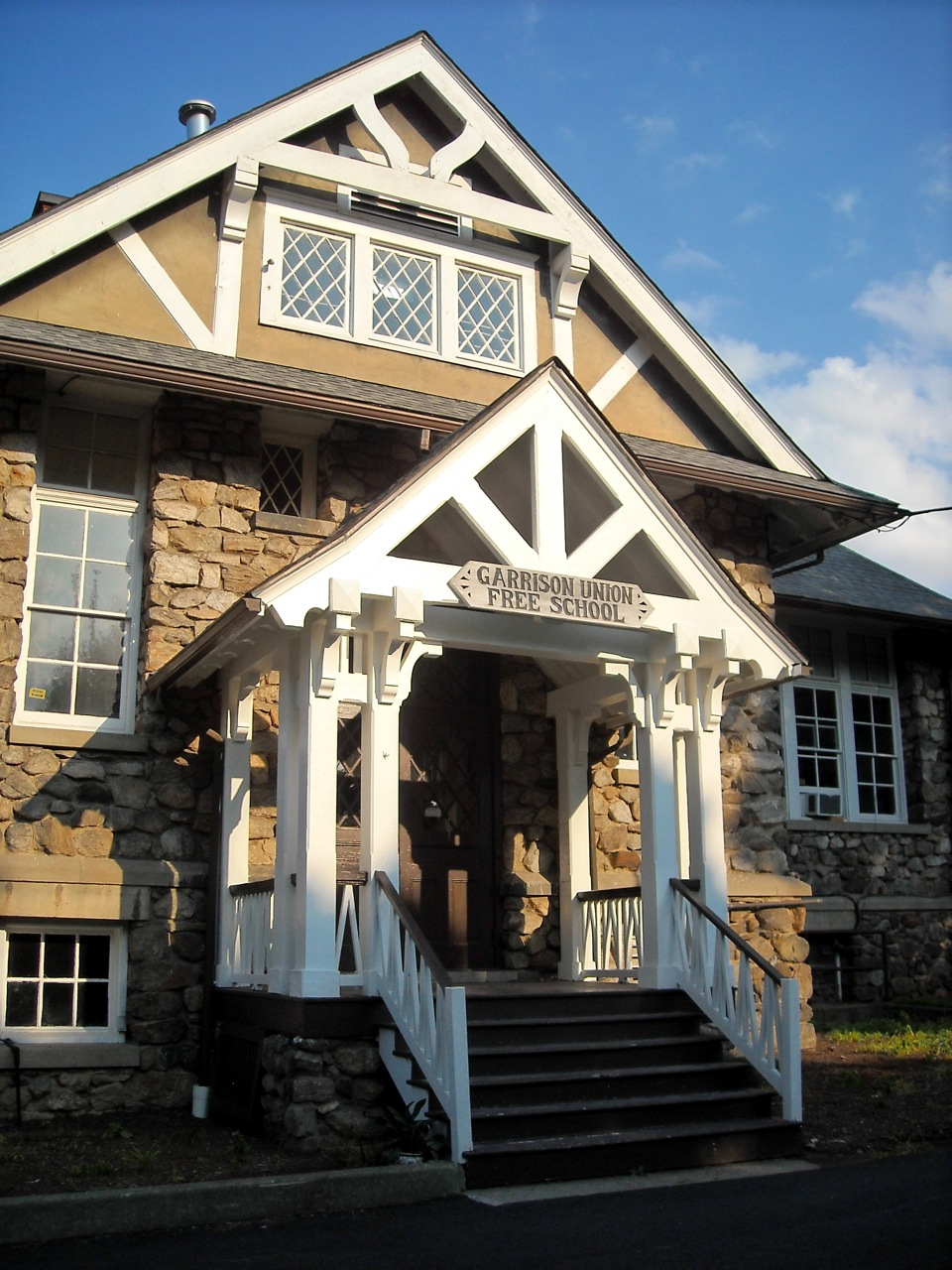
- Entrance to the 1908 Garrison schoolhouse, September 2009

Location
- 1100 Route 9D; Garrison, NY 10524; United States; 41°22′50″N 73°56′17″W

Information
- Funding type: Public
- Established: 1908
- Superintendent: Carl Albano
- Principal: Allison Emig
- Staff: 34
- Grades: K-8
- Enrollment: 295
  - Kindergarten: 36
  - Grade 1: 32
  - Grade 2: 31
  - Grade 3: 39
  - Grade 4: 32
  - Grade 5: 39
  - Grade 6: 30
  - Grade 7: 27
  - Grade 8: 29
- Student to teacher ratio: 1:9 teacher to student
- Language: English
- Campus size: 9 acres (3.6 ha)
- Campus type: Suburban
- Communities served: Garrison; Putnam Valley (portion)
- Website: Garrison Union Free School District
- Garrison Union Free School
- U.S. National Register of Historic Places
- Location within New York
- Location: NY 9-D, Garrison, New York
- Built: 1908
- Architectural style: Arts & Crafts
- MPS: Hudson Highlands MRA
- NRHP reference No.: 82001244
- Added to NRHP: November 23, 1982

Garrison Union Free School, also referred to as just Garrison School, educates students from kindergarten through eighth grade in the eponymous school district, which covers the hamlet of Garrison and nearby areas of the towns of Philipstown and Putnam Valley in Putnam County, New York, United States. It is located on NY 9D near the center of the hamlet, right across from St. Philip's Church in the Highlands, where it was originally located when established in 1793.

Graduating students who continue their education in public schools have the choice of doing so either at Haldane High School, to the north in Cold Spring; or James I. O'Neill High School across the Hudson River in Highland Falls. The district pays tuition for both.

== History ==
The minutes of St. Philip's show that the church resolved to build a "free school", paid for by subscription in 1793, when it was slowly re-establishing itself after half the pre-Revolutionary congregation, including its pastor and warden, had fled the country due to their Loyalist sympathies. The original building was replaced by another in 1837. In 1866, when the state designated it the Garrison Union Free School District, it moved to donated land slightly further north along the present Route 9D.

By the early 20th century the school's enrollment had grown as the New York Central Railroad had made Garrison more accessible to New York City and wealthy families had moved to the area to build houses taking in the scenery of the river and surrounding Hudson Highlands. In 1908 the first part of the current building was erected opposite the church on land donated by the family of recently deceased railroad executive Samuel Sloan.

During the 1920s and 1930s the district and its school grew via the addition of other small local districts: Graymoor, Travis Corners, Nelson Corners and then Continental Village, later reannexed by the neighboring Lakeland schools. The growth required additions to the building in the 1950s and '60s. School facilities were further augmented by the 181 acre (72 ha) School Forest to the east, donated by some descendants of Sloan and other families in the area. It has hiking trails and some remains of Revolutionary-era West Point fortifications.

In 1971 Manitou to the south, which had previously sent all its students to Haldane, merged with Garrison. The building's unique architecture earned it a listing on the National Register of Historic Places in 1982, the only school included in the Hudson Highlands Multiple Resource Area Multiple Property Submission. Continued growth required the addition of another wing in 2002 to provide a gym, eight classrooms and a computer lab for the middle school students. A new front entrance was also added.

After 1997 Saint Basil Academy stopped in-house instruction. Saint Basil had requested Garrison School be the party educating Saint Basil students, but the Garrison district declined. After 2003, when Highland Falls-Fort Montgomery stopped educating Saint Basil students over non-payment of tuition, Saint Basil asked Garrison to take the students for free; Garrison argued against this because Saint Basil was not officially licensed to be in charge of its students. In fall 2003 the New York State Education Department decided that in the meantime, the Garrison district would be the school district for Saint Basil Academy students who originated from households residing in New York State. Garrison chose to educate Saint Basil students up to the 8th grade. Marek Fuchs of The New York Times wrote that due to the extra expenses, "The decision [to have Garrison educate the students] was an unpopular one in Garrison." In April 2004 the New York State Education Department had ruled that the Garrison district was not required to educate Saint Basil students.

In September 2008, the Garrison School community celebrated the 100th Anniversary of the stone Garrison School House with an alumni reunion and reenactment of the laying of the cornerstone in 1908.

== Athletics ==
Garrison offers students a choice between two sports every season depending on gender. Boys and girls can play soccer in the fall and basketball in the winter. Boys can play lacrosse in the spring and Girls can play softball in the spring.

== See also ==
- National Register of Historic Places listings in Putnam County, New York
