= William Hoyt =

William Hoyt may refer to:

- William Hoyt (athlete) (1875–1954), American pole vaulter
- William B. Hoyt (1937–1992), member of the New York State Assembly
- William Dana Hoyt (born 1880), phycologist with the botanical abbreviation "Hoyt"
- William Lloyd Hoyt (born 1930), Canadian lawyer and judge
- William R. Hoyt, state senator for South Carolina during the Reconstruction Era
