= James I. O'Neill High School =

Location
- 21 Morgan Rd. Highland Falls, New York 10928; United States; 41.351658°N 73.975407°W

Information
- Opened: 1971
- School district: Highland Falls-Fort Montgomery Central School District
- School number: NCES: 361443001196; State: 440901040003
- CEEB code: 332375
- Principal: Robin Haberman
- Teaching staff: 44.54 (FTE)
- Grades: 9–12
- Enrollment: 409 (2024–2025)
- Average class size: 21
- Student to teacher ratio: 10.03
- Hours in school day: 11 periods
- Colors: Maroon, White, Gold
- Fight song: Indian Fight song
- Athletics: 2019 Section 9 Champions: Girls' Soccer, Boys' and Girls' Cross Country
- Mascot: Raiders (Indian Raiders)
- Nickname: O'Neill
- Team name: Raiders
- Newspaper: Raider Review
- Communities served: Highland Falls, Fort Montgomery, West Point; Garrison (sent by home district); USMA (under contract); Formerly Saint Basil Academy
- Website: jiohs.hffmcsd.org

James I. O'Neill High School is a public high school in Highland Falls, New York, and part of the Highland Falls-Fort Montgomery Central School District.

== History ==
James I. O'Neill High School opened in 1971, replacing the existing Highland Falls High School on Mountain Avenue in Highland Falls. In 2019, contracts were awarded for the first major improvements to the school since its original building, including new playing fields, tennis courts, and classroom improvements.

In September 2004 O'Neill was still taking students from Saint Basil Academy who were not from families resident in New York State. At the time the academy was embroiled in a controversy over where it should send its students to school, as the academy no longer had its own in-house school, and whether it needed to pay for the tuition.

In 2021, 190 children living on-post at United States Military Academy (USMA) in West Point attended O'Neill. In 2021 the agency at West Point announced that the bid to educate West Point High School students would be competitive, In March 2022 the O'Neill contract was renewed.

== Service area ==
The Highland Falls-Fort Montgomery district, of which O'Neill is the sole comprehensive high school, includes most of the town of Highlands and portions of the town of Woodbury. It includes the village of Highland Falls and the hamlets of Fort Montgomery and West Point. O'Neill is one of two high schools taking students from the territory of the Garrison Union Free School District (GUFSD), as that district only educates up to 8th grade and pays to send its students elsewhere for high school. GUFSD includes sections of Philipstown and Putnam Valley towns, with the former portion including Garrison hamlet. Additionally, USMA sends high school aged students who are dependents of on-base military personnel to O'Neill under contract.

== Notable alumni ==
- Mike Doughty – musician
- Charles Durning – actor
- Ben Greenspan – college baseball coach
- Carson Kreitzer – playwright
- Paul Rieckhoff – writer, social entrepreneur and veteran of the United States Army
- Guinevere Turner – film director
- Johnson Wagner – professional golfer
- Fred Wilson – venture capitalist and blogger
