= Saint Basil Academy (Garrison, New York) =

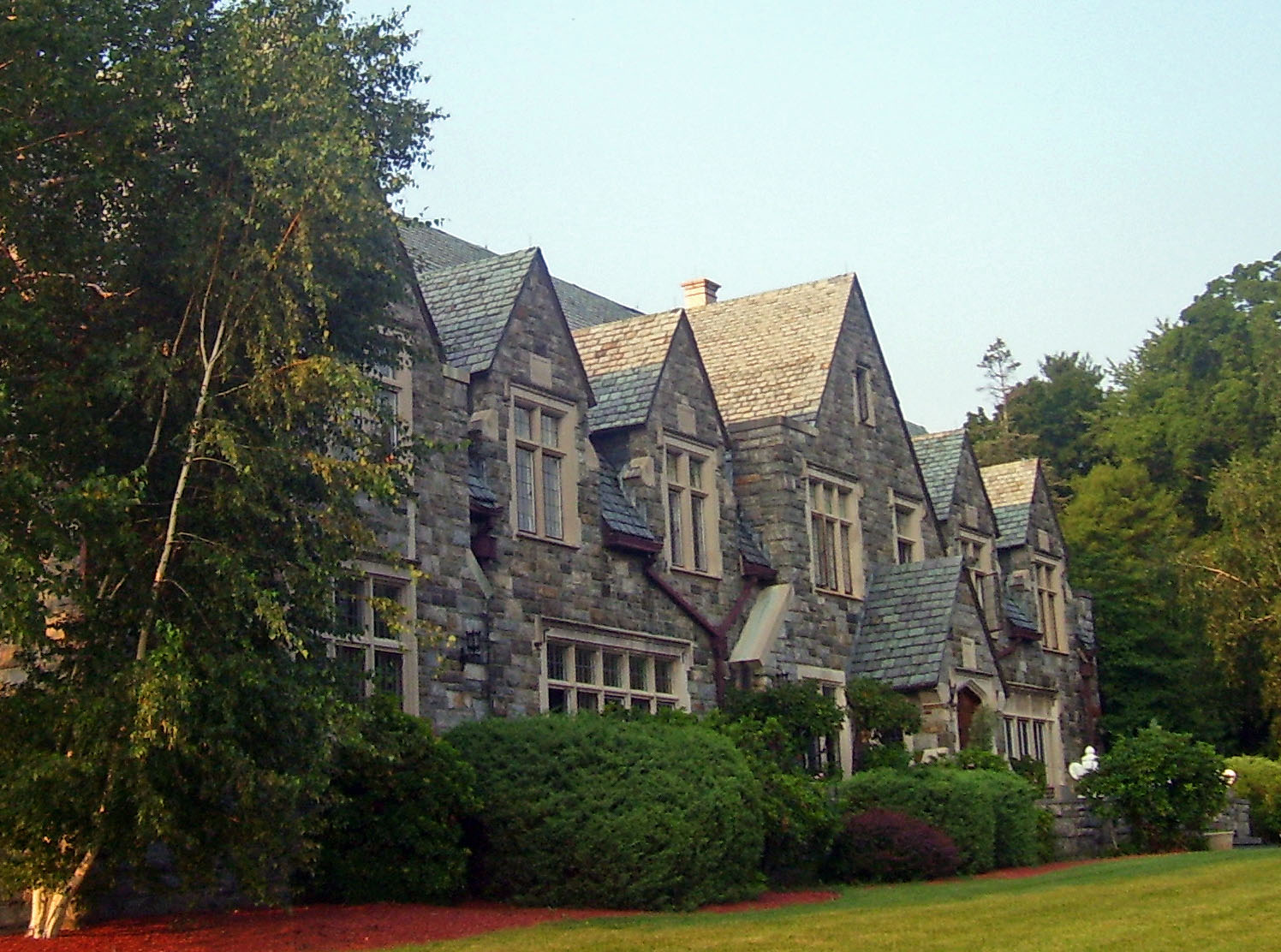
- Main building

Location
- 79 Saint Basil Road; Garrison, NY 10524; United States; 41°23′51″N 73°56′13″W

Information
- Funding type: Private
- Religious affiliation: Greek Orthodox
- Founded: 1944
- Founder: Archbishop Athenagoras (Spyrou)
- Closed: 1997 (as a school: it continues to exist as a residential boarding facility)
- Oversight: Greek Orthodox Archdiocese of America
- Campus: Rural
- Campus size: 150 acres (61 ha)
- Website: Welcome to Saint Basil Academy
- Eagle's Rest
- U.S. National Register of Historic Places
- Location within New York
- Location: NY 9-D, Philipstown, New York
- Area: 214.3 acres (86.7 ha)
- Built: 1928
- Architectural style: Late 19th And 20th Century Revivals
- MPS: Hudson Highlands MRA
- NRHP reference No.: 82001239
- Added to NRHP: November 23, 1982

Saint Basil Academy is a residential institution for children and families in need run by the Greek Orthodox Archdiocese of America in Garrison, New York, United States. Prior to 1997, it operated its own in-house school. It is located at Eagle's Rest, previously the estate of Jacob Ruppert, owner of the New York Yankees in the early 20th century, between NY 9D and the Hudson River.

During Ruppert's lifetime many Yankees players, including Babe Ruth, were frequent visitors. After his death, the estate remained vacant until 1944, when Archbishop Athenagoras acquired the property for the church and founded the school. In 1982 it was listed on the National Register of Historic Places (NRHP) in recognition of both Ruppert's historical importance and its well-preserved early Twentieth-century architecture.

The school is under the management of the Greek Orthodox Archdiocese of America.

== History ==
=== 19th century ===
The property was part of a large tract granted to local landowner Philip Philipse in 1686 by the British Crown. His son Frederick left it to his daughter Mary Gouverneur in 1829, and she ultimately divided it three ways, taking the northern third and naming it Eagles' Rest, which was eventually sold to Louis Fitzgerald, a local businessman who served as an officer in the Union Army during the Civil War.

=== 20th century ===
In 1919, his three daughters in turn sold the estate to Ruppert, who made his fortune in his family's brewing business, served in Congress and bought the Yankees. He commenced major building on the property in the early 1920s, tearing down the original mansion for the current Tudorbethan structure, which was finished in 1928.

The Yankees and their "Murderers' Row" became champions under Ruppert's ownership, and many players were guests at the estate. Babe Ruth reportedly signed one of his most lucrative contracts there. The brewing business had also survived Prohibition by making near beer, and since real estate had become cheap after the Crash of 1929, Ruppert began expanding it, acquiring the land between the old and new alignments of NY 9D when the road was relocated east to its present route. In these buildings he kept a small personal zoo, with one of the largest collections of monkeys, wild birds and peacocks in the world at the time. In the mansion he had a collection of furniture, pottery, jade and Chinese porcelains. The estate employed 40 people.

Construction continued through Ruppert's death in 1939, with smaller outbuildings added, bringing the estate to a total of 26 buildings. Many of these are considered contributing resources to the NRHP listing.

After five years of vacancy, the Greek Orthodox Ladies Philoptochos Society bought the property in 1944 for $55,000 ($1,005,907 in 2008 dollars). Property taxes were increasing on large estates, and as a nonprofit the church was exempt. At first, it was coeducational, but soon it was decided to limit admission to girls due to the limited space available with only six buildings usable at the time.

In addition to its secondary program, the academy was also, at first, a women's junior college, offering a three-year teacher training program, and an orphanage. Graduates went on to work for the church as teachers or secretaries. Later in the 1950s, the school decided to admit boys again, and in 1959 a former stable had been converted into a boys' dormitory.

The American Hellenic Educational Progressive Association (AHEPA), which had raised money for the stable conversion, continued its efforts and built a new classroom building, just north of the mansion, which opened in 1962. The Pan-Arcadian Fraternal Association built a new gymnasium that doubled as an auditorium the next year, inspiring Archbishop Iakovos to call for money for more new dormitories.

In 1973, the junior college and its programs merged with Hellenic College in Brookline, Massachusetts. Three years later, in 1976, the Philoptochos sold the 250 acres (100 ha) of marshland along the Hudson River to the Audubon Society, which has made it their Constitution Island Sanctuary for the protection of some of the river's bird species.

In 1981, building began on a library and, five years later, on a swimming pool (later enclosed) in 1986. In 1985, architect William Chirgotis designed and funded a new chapel in memory of his parents. A playground was built with donated money in 1990, and in 1999 a medical and dental facility. Maintenance and renovation projects continue around campus as educational programs for students.

After 1997, Saint Basil ceased in-house instruction, so Highland Falls-Fort Montgomery Central School District (HFFMCSD) began educating Saint Basil students. Saint Basil had requested Garrison Union Free School District, which sends high school students to Highland Falls-Fort Montgomery, be the party educating Saint Basil students, but the Garrison district declined.

=== 21st century ===
In 2003, Highland Falls-Fort Montgomery stopped allowing St. Basil students to attend classes at Highland Falls-Fort Montgomery because St. Basil was not paying tuition for the students. Saint Basil had failed to pay $237,000 to HFFMCSD. Saint Basil then asked Garrison UFSD to take the students for free; Garrison argued against this because Saint Basil was not officially licensed to be in charge of its students.

In fall 2003, the New York State Education Department decided that in the meantime, the Garrison district would be the school district for Saint Basil Academy students who originated from households residing in New York State. Garrison chose to educate Saint Basil students up to the 8th grade. Marek Fuchs of The New York Times wrote that due to the extra expenses, "The decision [to have Garrison educate the students] was an unpopular one in Garrison." In November 2003 the New York State Office of Children and Family Services formally requested that Saint Basil apply for such a license in order to stay open. The Department of Children and Families turned down the application in January 2004 and stated that Saint Basil should not operate anymore. However in April 2004 the New York State Education Department had ruled that the Garrison district was not required to educate Saint Basil students. In September 2004 Highland Falls-Fort Montgomery's high school, James I. O'Neill High School, was still taking students from Saint Basil who were not from families resident in New York State.

As of 2013, Saint Basil sent elementary and middle school aged students to Bishop Dunn Memorial School of Mount Saint Mary College in Newburgh, and high school students to Haldane High School of Haldane Central School District in Cold Spring.

In 2016, Bishop Dunn Memorial was still the K-8 used by Saint Basil, and it sent high school aged children to different high schools.

== Resident demographics ==
As of 2004, most of the students were of races other than non-Hispanic white and originated from urban environments. Usually children are admitted when social service government organizations send them there. Many of the children came from environments where child abuse or family problems occurred.

== See also ==
- List of boarding schools in the United States
- National Register of Historic Places listings in Putnam County, New York
