= Lenon Hoyte =

American antique collector

- Born: 4 July 1905
- Died: 1 August 1999

Lenon Hoyte (4 July 1905 – 1 August 1999) was an American collector of antique dolls and toys. She was best known for founding Aunt Len's Doll and Toy Museum in New York City.
