= Edith Hoyt =

American painter

- Born: April 10, 1894; West Point, New York, New York, United States
- Died: 1971 (aged 76–77); Washington, D.C., United States
- Known for: Watercolor painting
- Style: Landscape painting Cityscape; Still life

Edith Hoyt (April 10, 1894 – 1971) was an American painter. Hoyt painted primarily landscapes, cityscapes and floral watercolors.

== Life and work ==
Edith Hoyt was born in West Point, New York in April 1894. She attended the Corcoran School of the Arts and Design, studying under painter Charles Herbert Woodbury. Starting in 1921, Hoyt spent summers in Canada, specifically in Jasper National Park and in Gaspé, Quebec. Her work was exhibited at the Corcoran, American Watercolor Society, Pennsylvania Academy and Brooklyn Museum. In 1963, she worked and exhibited in Cap-à-l'Aigle, Canada, in 1963. In 1932, Hoyt was invited to the Howard University Gallery event Presenting Works of Negro Artists to talk on her experiences in Jasper national park. One of her paintings was allegedly requested by the Little Rock Ark art association the prior week.

== Collections ==
- The Ice Bridge at St. Petronille, IO, oil on canvas, 1941, Musée national des beaux-arts du Québec
- Winter Scene Ste Pétronille, I.O., oil on canvas, 1941, Musée national des beaux-arts du Québec
- La Malbaie, oil on canvas, 1949, Ville de La Malbaie - Bibliothèque
