= Highlands, New York =

Highlands
- Town
- Town of Highlands
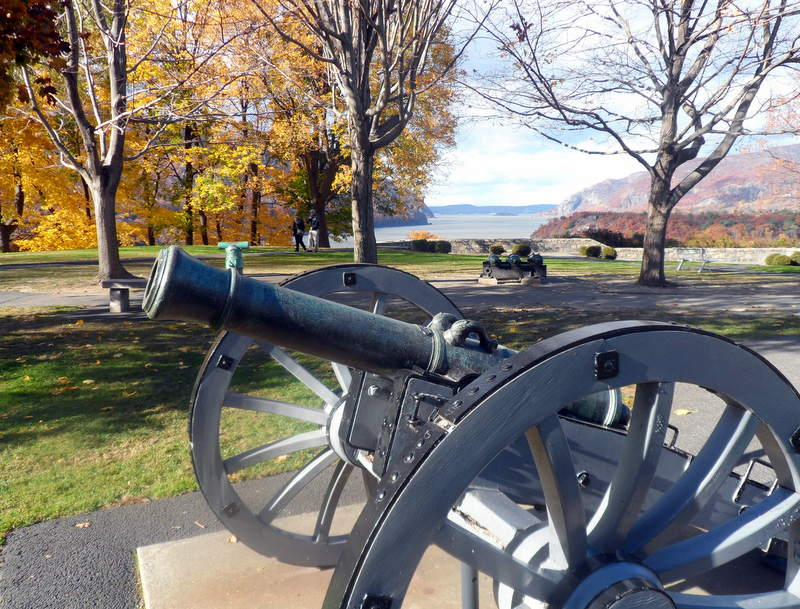
- United States Military Academy

- Location in Orange County and the state of New York.

- Location within the state of New York
- Coordinates: 41°21′36″N 074°00′30″W
- Country: United States
- State: New York
- County: Orange

Government (as of 2013)
  - Type: Town Council
  - Town Supervisor: Bob Livsey (D)
  - Town Council: Members' List: • Joseph DeWitt (DEM); • Richard Sullivan (REP); • Tyrone King (BLK); • Dean Jeager (REP)

Area
  - Total: 33.46 sq mi (86.65 km^{2})
  - Land: 30.40 sq mi (78.73 km^{2})
  - Water: 3.06 sq mi (7.93 km^{2}) 9.15%
- Elevation: 1,020 ft (310 m)

Population (2020)
  - Total: 12,939
  - Density: 425.7/sq mi (164.35/km^{2})
- Time zone: UTC-5 (Eastern (EST))
  - Summer (DST): UTC-4 (EDT)
- FIPS code: 36-34550
- GNIS feature ID: 979067
- Website: highlands-ny.gov

Highlands is a town on the eastern border of Orange County, New York. The population was 12,939 at the 2020 census. West Point, including the United States Military Academy, is located alongside the Hudson River in Highlands.

== History ==
The town was first settled circa 1725 by John Moore, a patentee for this territory. During the American Revolution, colonial forces constructed Fort Montgomery and Fort Clinton to obstruct enemy progress on the river. Highlands was created from the town of Cornwall in 1872, making it one of the last towns formed in the county.

== Geography ==
Highlands is located at 41°21′36″N 074°00′30″W (41.3601108, -74.0084276) and its elevation is 1,017 feet (310 m). According to the 2020 U.S. census, the town has a total area of 33.46 square miles (86.66 km^{2}), of which 30.40 square miles (78.74 km^{2}) is land and 3.06 square miles (7.93 km^{2}) is water. Part of the southern town line is the border of Rockland County. The eastern town boundary is the border of Putnam County, marked by the Hudson River.

US-9W and NY-218 are important north-south highways. NY-293 intersects these, west of the military academy.

== Demographics ==
Historical population
Census	Pop.	Note	%±
1880	3,404		—
1890	4,099		20.4%
1900	4,519		10.2%
1910	6,133		35.7%
1920	6,136		0.0%
1930	7,057		15.0%
1940	9,307		31.9%
1950	10,467		12.5%
1960	11,990		14.6%
1970	14,661		22.3%
1980	14,004		−4.5%
1990	13,667		−2.4%
2000	12,484		−8.7%
2010	12,492		0.1%
2020	12,939		3.6%
U.S. Decennial Census

As of the census of 2000, there were 12,484 people, 3,230 households, and 2,322 families residing in the town. The population density was 404 inhabitants per square mile (156/km^{2}). There were 3,418 housing units at an average density of 110.6 per square mile (42.7/km^{2}). The racial makeup of the town was 75.18% White, 13.16% African American, .49% Native American, 2.68% Asian, 0.16% Pacific Islander, 2.27% from other races, and 3.08% from two or more races. Hispanic or Latino of any race were 9.71% of the population.

There were 3,230 households, out of which 43.8% had children under the age of 18 living with them, 59.6% were married couples living together, 8.9% had a female householder with no husband present, and 28.1% were non-families. 24.1% of all households were made up of individuals, and 8.5% had someone living alone who was 65 years of age or older. The average household size was 2.74 and the average family size was 3.32.

The age distribution is 22.8% under the age of 18, 32.1% from 18 to 24, 26.7% from 25 to 44, 12.2% from 45 to 64, and 6.2% who were 65 years of age or older. The median age was 23 years. For every 100 females, there were 147.7 males. For every 100 females age 18 and over, there were 162.2 males. These statistics are consistent with the presence of the West Point military base in general, and the Academy in particular.

The median income for a household in the town was $52,816, and the median income for a family was $59,345. Males had a median income of $23,491 versus $27,406 for females. The per capita income for the town was $17,830. About 2.8% of families and 3.6% of the population were below the poverty line, including 4.3% of those under age 18 and 3.0% of those age 65 or over.

== Communities and locations in the town of Highlands ==
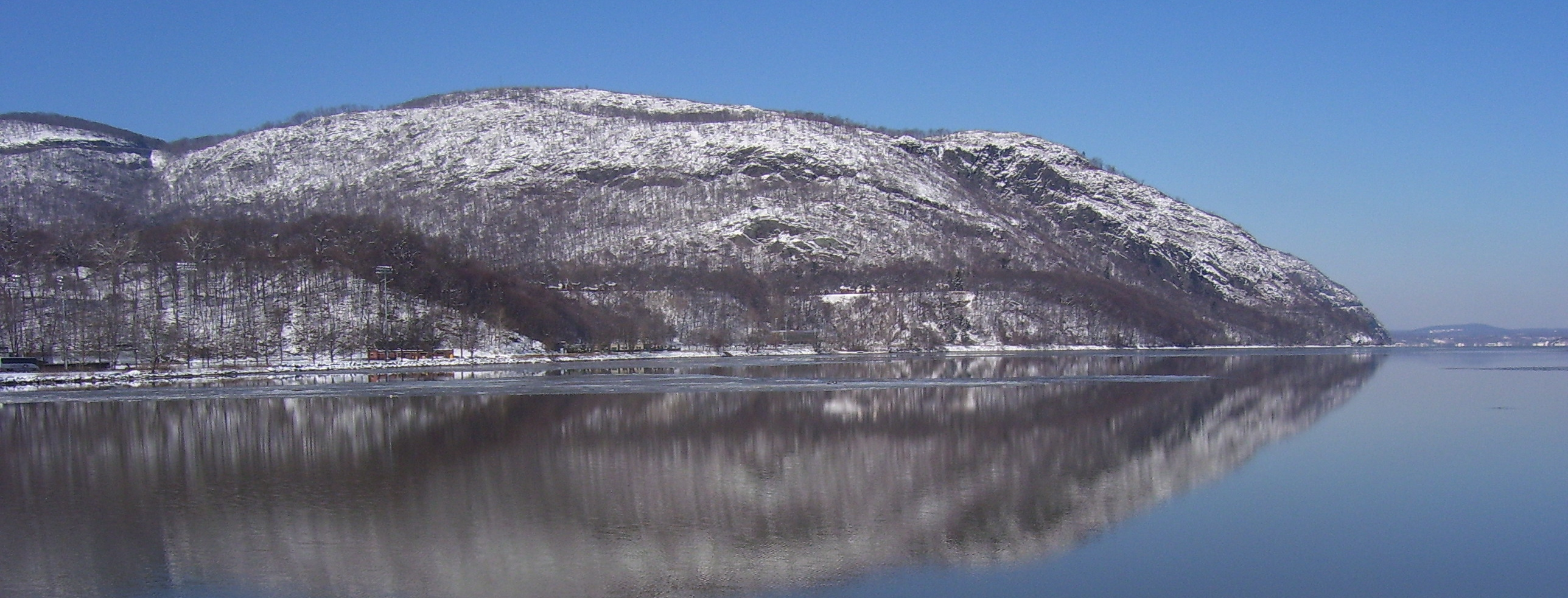
Crow's Nest reflecting in the Hudson River

- Bear Mountain State Park – part of the state park is on the southern border of the town.
- Crow's Nest – an elevated location near the northern town line.
- Fort Montgomery – a hamlet on the bank of the Hudson River.
- Gees Point – a projection into the Hudson River by West Point village.
- Highland Falls – the village of Highland Falls in the eastern part of the town on the Hudson River.
- Palisades Interstate Park – part of the park is by the southern town line.
- West Point – a hamlet on the Hudson River north of West Point, the military academy.

== Government in Highlands ==
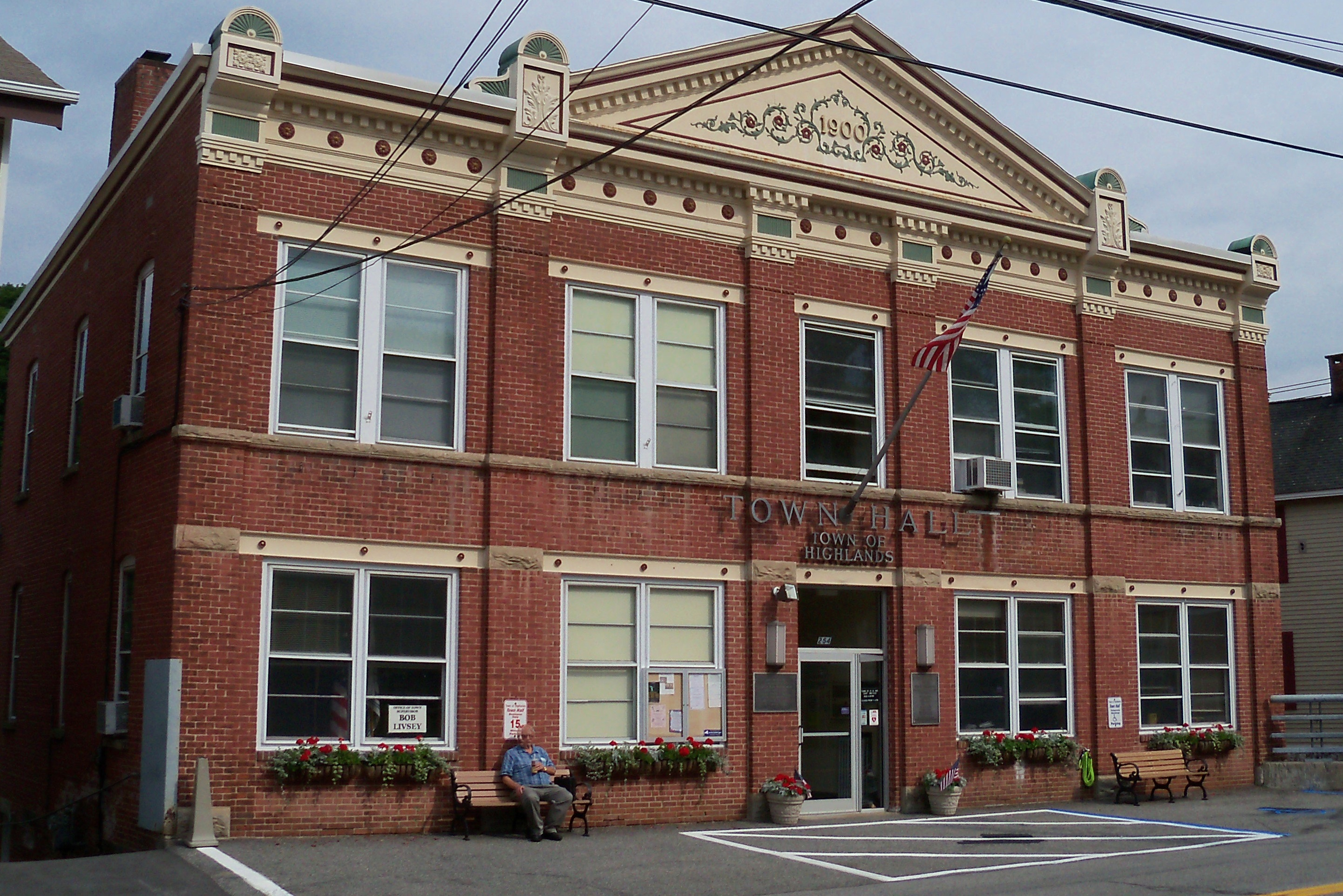
Highlands Town Hall

Highlands is represented in the Orange County legislature by Laurie Tautel (D).

== Education ==
Most of Highlands is in Highland Falls-Fort Montgomery Central School District. A portion to the southwest is in the Haverstraw-Stony Point Central School District (North Rockland). James I. O'Neill High School is the high school of the Highland Falls-Fort Montgomery portion while North Rockland High School is the high school for the North Rockland part.

The Department of Defense Education Activity (DoDEA) maintains elementary and middle schools for children of military personnel on-post at USMA, but sends high school aged students who are dependents of on-base military personnel to O'Neill. In March 2022 USMA's contract with O'Neill was renewed.

There was also a parochial school in Highland Falls, Sacred Heart of Jesus School (of the Roman Catholic Archdiocese of New York), that served students in grades pre-kindergarten through eight. The school opened in 1930 and closed in 2011. The archdiocese suggested that parents send their children to St. Gregory Barbarigo School in Garnerville.
