= Hoyt, West Virginia =

Hoyt
- Unincorporated community
- Location within the state of West Virginia Hoyt (the United States)
- Coordinates: 39°36′46″N 80°38′12″W
- Country: United States
- State: West Virginia
- County: Wetzel
- Elevation: 1,417 ft (432 m)
- Time zone: UTC-5 (Eastern (EST))
  - Summer (DST): UTC-4 (EDT)
- GNIS ID: 1554751

Hoyt is an unincorporated community in Wetzel County, West Virginia, United States.
