= William R. Hoyt =

South Carolina politician

South Carolina Senate
- In office 1868–1870

Personal details
- Born: Massachusetts
- Party: Republican

Military service
- Allegiance: United States
- Branch/service: United States Army
- Unit: First Massachusetts Cavalry
- Battles/wars: Civil War

William R. Hoyt was a state senator in South Carolina during the Reconstruction era from 1868 until 1870. He represented Colleton County. He was from Massachusetts.

He served in the First Massachusetts Cavalry and was a mason by trade.

Hoyt worked as a builder in Walterboro, South Carolina. He was listed as a member of the South Carolina Senate in 1868. He was identified as "colored".

He was stabbed by a political rival on election day in 1870 and left South Carolina the following year.
