= West Point, New York =

- CDP
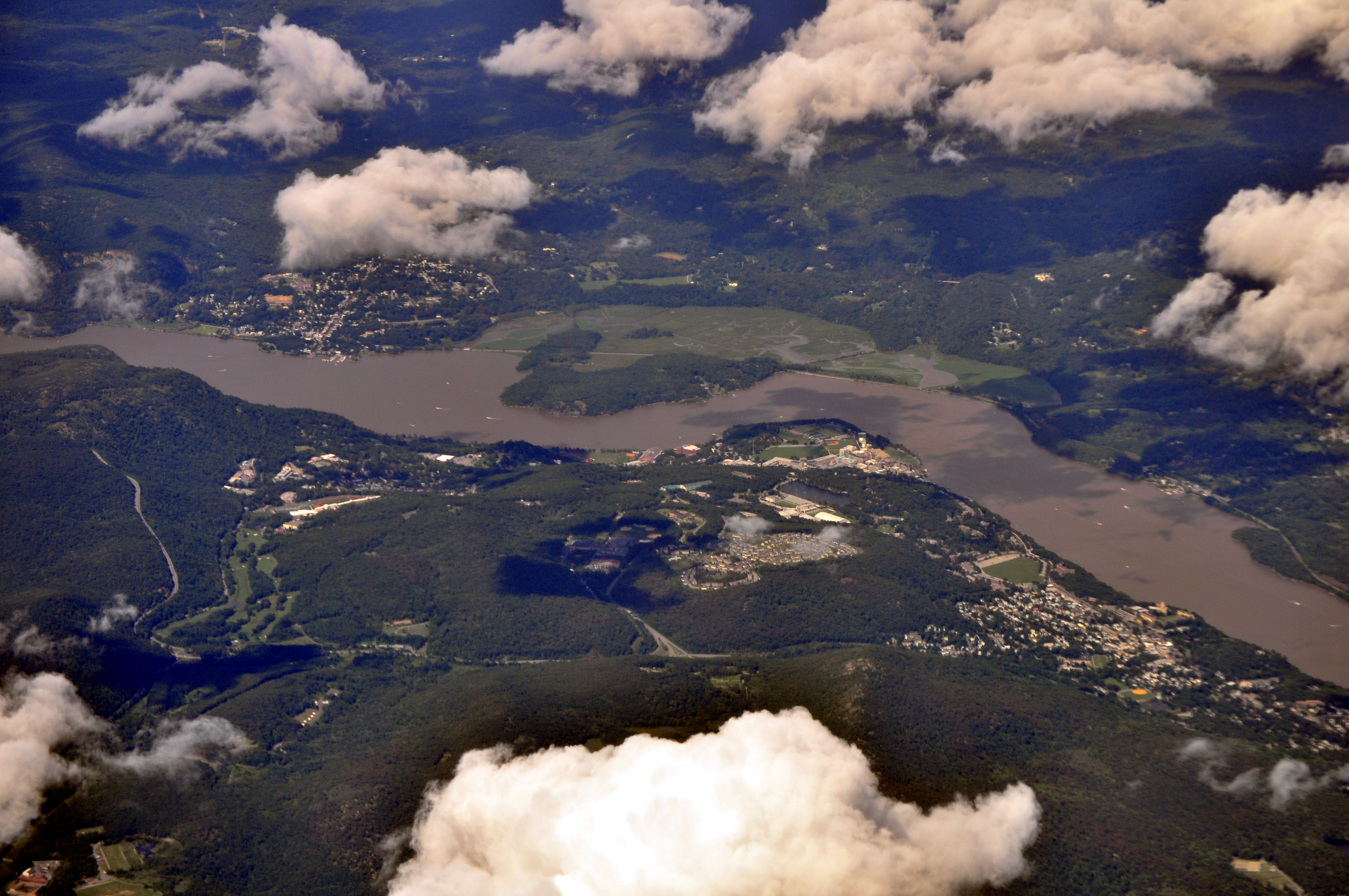
- Aerial view from southwest includes the Hudson River, Highland Falls (on right), Cold Spring (on left) across the river in Putnam County

- Location in New York and Orange County

- Location in New York Location in the United States
- Coordinates: 41°23′42″N 73°57′18″W
- Country: United States
- State: New York
- County: Orange
- Town: Highlands

Area
  - Total: 19.34 sq mi (50.08 km^{2})
  - Land: 18.44 sq mi (47.75 km^{2})
  - Water: 0.90 sq mi (2.33 km^{2})

Population (2020)
  - Total: 7,341
  - Density: 398.2/sq mi (153.75/km^{2})
- Time zone: UTC−5 (Eastern (EST))
  - Summer (DST): UTC−4 (EDT)
- ZIP Codes: 10996–10997
- Area code: 845
- FIPS code: 36-80747

West Point is a census-designated place in Orange County, New York, United States. It is the oldest continuously occupied military post in the United States.

Located on the Hudson River in New York, General George Washington stationed his headquarters in West Point in the summer and fall of 1779 during the American Revolutionary War, and later called it "the most important Post in America" in 1781 following the war's end. West Point was also the site of General Benedict Arnold's failed attempt at treason during the Revolutionary War.

West Point was first occupied by the United States Armed Forces in January 1778 by Brigadier General Samuel Holden Parsons. Since then, West Point has been occupied by the United States Army. It comprises 25.1 sq mi (65 km^{2}) land and water, including the campus of the United States Military Academy, which is commonly referred to as "West Point".

West Point is a census-designated place (CDP) located in the town of Highlands in Orange County, located on the western bank of the Hudson River. The population was 7,341 at the 2020 census. It is part of the Kiryas Joel–Poughkeepsie–Newburgh metropolitan area as well as the larger New York–Newark, NY–NJ–CT–PA Combined Statistical Area.

== History ==
=== American Revolutionary War ===
==== Construction ====
The site for West Point was originally picked because of the pronounced S-curve in the Hudson River at that point during the American Revolutionary War, and was the subject of a committee reporting on fortifications in the Hudson River in November 1775, which first recommended occupying the land. Construction of the fort was begun under Captain Louis de la Radiere as chief engineer of the fort, however, New York governor George Clinton thought that Radiere was "lacking" in the knowledge needed to hold his position. Thus it was completed under Polish Colonel Tadeusz Kościuszko between 1778–1780; it was a key defensive fortification, overlooking the turn in the Hudson River and the Great Chain. On January 27, 1778, Brigadier General Samuel Holden Parsons and his brigade, including elements of Connecticut Colony's patriot militia, crossed an iced over Hudson River and climbed to the plain on West Point.

General George Washington watched the construction of the fort closely and considered the fort to be General Alexander McDougall's "first priority".

In 1778, Major General Israel Putnam wrote, "The place agreed upon to obstruct the navigation of Hudson river was at West Point." A fort there, Fort Clinton, named after the governor's brother, Colonel James Clinton (Note: Fort Clinton was originally named Fort Arnold; however, with Benedict Arnold's defection to the British Army, the fort was renamed to Fort Clinton.) (whose brigade built the main fort), was built as well. The southern and western walls were nine feet high and twenty feet thick. Three redoubts and batteries on the south were named Forts Meigs, Wyllys, and Webb.

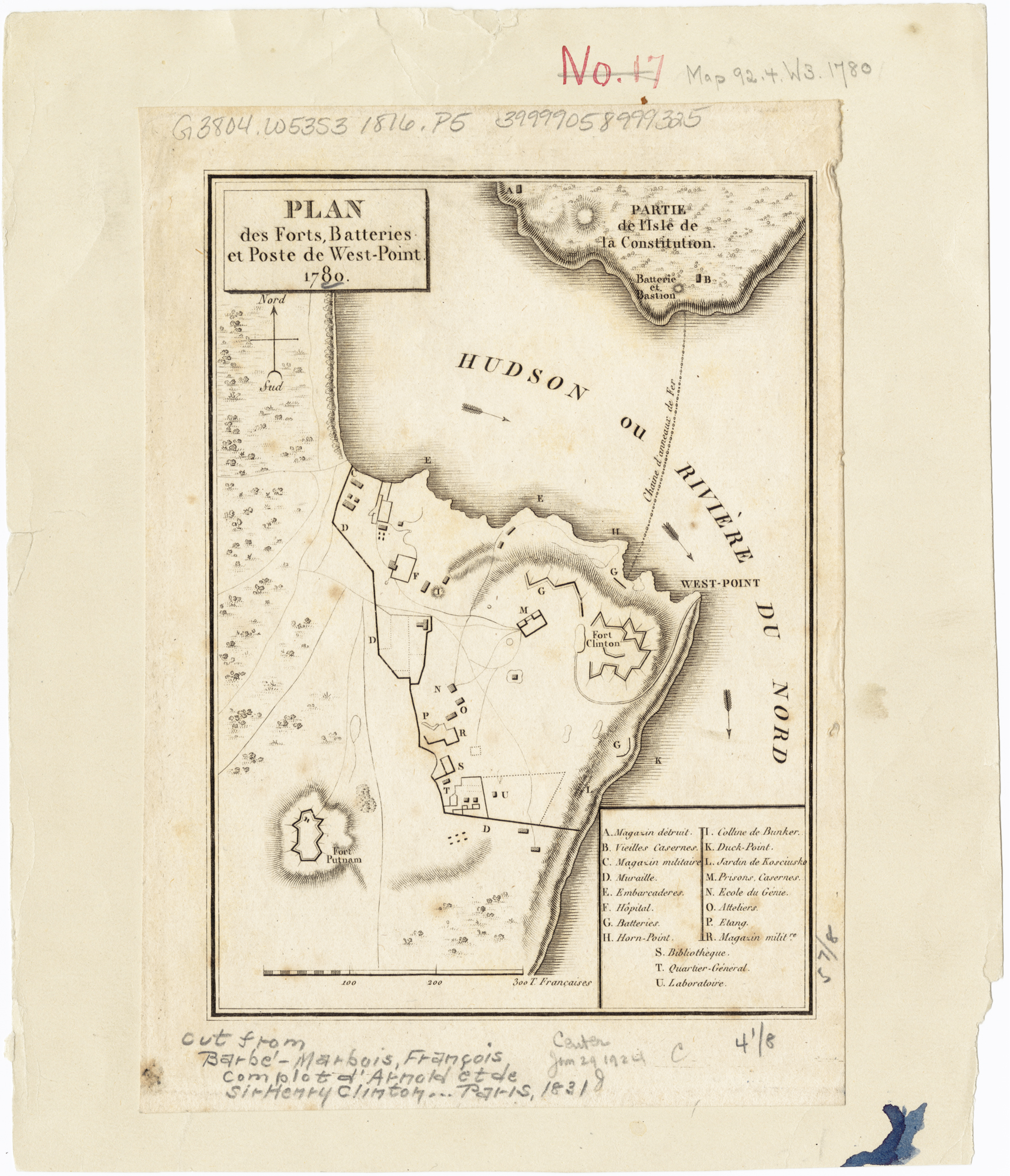
Map of West Point, 1780.

==== After construction ====
West Point was staffed by a small garrison of Continental Army Soldiers from early in 1776 through the end of the war. A great iron chain was laid across the Hudson at this point in 1778 to prevent British Navy vessels from sailing further up the Hudson River, which was never tested by the British. The site comprised multiple redoubts, as well as Fort Putnam, situated on a high hill overlooking the river. Named after its builder, Revolutionary War General and engineer Rufus Putnam, the fort is still preserved in its original design.

Parliament sent instructions to General Sir Henry Clinton to force George Washington out of West Point. Clinton decided to capture the strategically important posts Stony Point and Verplanck's Point, which were twelve miles south of West Point. Clinton captured the forts on June 1, 1779. To block the British advance, Washington moved his troops further up the Hudson.

Early on in May 1779, General Benedict Arnold had met with a Philadelphia merchant named Joseph Stansbury. Afterwards, Stansbury had gone to Sir Henry Clinton, to whom he offered Arnold's "services". Clinton had been pursuing a campaign to take control of the Hudson River, so he had been interested in the plans and information of the defenses of West Point and other defenses on the Hudson River. Arnold wrote a series of letters to Clinton, one of which was written on July 12, making explicit the offer to surrender West Point to the British, later for a finalized offer of £20,000. On August 3, 1780, Arnold obtained command of West Point, which also gave him command of the American-controlled portion of the Hudson. Arnold then intentionally started weakening the fort's defenses, and through a letter sent to Clinton, proposed a meeting with British Major John André to discuss information on West Point. A meeting was set for September 11; however, Arnold and André did not meet until September 21. Carrying the plans for West Point, André was captured on September 23 by three militiamen, and the information about West Point was found. After Arnold's betrayal, the fort, which was also known as Fort Arnold at the time, was renamed to Fort Clinton after General James Clinton.

=== Post-war ===
After the conclusion of the American Revolution, West Point was used as a storage facility for cannon and other military property used by the Continental Army and until November 28, 1779, was used as the temporary headquarters to George Washington, who called it "the most important Post in America" in 1781. Viewing a standing army as "dangerous", Congress demobilized American forces but left fewer than a hundred men at West Point. However, it was still the largest post in the army in the immediate years after the Revolutionary War.

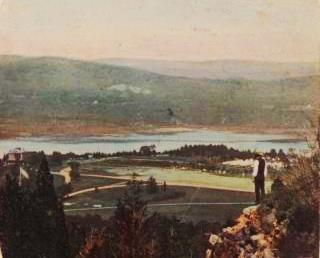
View of the West Point area from Fort Putnam, c. 1865

Favoring West Point due to its location and defenses, Henry Knox and Alexander Hamilton made the first official recommendation to establish a military academy at West Point in 1790. However, Congress rejected the proposal, although earlier in 1790, New York merchant and American Revolution patriot Stephen Moore sold his estate (known as "Moore's Folly") to the United States, following an Act of Congress that solidified the sale on September 10, 1790, for $11,085, which meant Congress had gained full possession of the fort. The United States Military Academy was established at West Point in 1802. It is the nation's oldest service academy, and is metonymically called "West Point" as well. West Point has the distinction of being the longest continuously occupied United States military installation.

== Geography and climate ==
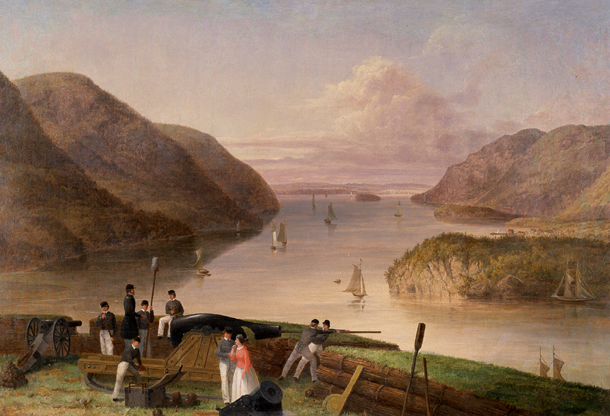
Looking north on the Hudson River from West Point (Seth Eastman, 1875)

West Point is located at 41° 23′ 42" N 73° 57' 18" W (41.395° N 73.955° W). According to the United States Census Bureau, the CDP has a total area of 25.1 sq mi (65 km^{2}); 24.3 sq mi (63 km^{2}) land and 0.7 sq mi (1.8 km^{2}) water. It is located in the town of Highlands and is in Orange County. West Point and the contiguous village of Highland Falls are on the western bank of the Hudson River.

West Point has a humid continental climate (Köppen Dfa), with four distinct seasons. Summers are hot and humid, while winters are cold with moderate snowfall. The monthly daily average temperature ranges from 27.5 °F (−2.5 °C) in January to 74.1 °F (23.4 °C) in July. The average annual precipitation was approximately 51.47 in (1,310 mm) from 1991–2020; snow averaged at 35.7 in (91 cm) from 1991–2020, although this total may vary considerably from year to year. Extremes in temperature range from 106 °F (41 °C) on July 22, 1926, down to −7 °F (−22 °C) on January 22, 1984.

Climate data for West Point, New York (1991–2010 normals, extremes 1890–present)
Month	Jan	Feb	Mar	Apr	May	Jun	Jul	Aug	Sep	Oct	Nov	Dec	Year
Record high °F (°C)	71 (22)	77 (25)	86 (30)	96 (36)	97 (36)	102 (39)	106 (41)	105 (41)	105 (41)	92 (33)	82 (28)	72 (22)	106 (41)
Mean daily maximum °F (°C)	35.8 (2.1)	38.9 (3.8)	47.4 (8.6)	60.4 (15.8)	71.5 (21.9)	79.9 (26.6)	85.2 (29.6)	83.3 (28.5)	76.0 (24.4)	63.4 (17.4)	51.4 (10.8)	40.7 (4.8)	61.2 (16.2)
Daily mean °F (°C)	28.2 (−2.1)	30.6 (−0.8)	38.5 (3.6)	50.4 (10.2)	61.1 (16.2)	69.8 (21.0)	75.3 (24.1)	73.6 (23.1)	66.4 (19.1)	54.5 (12.5)	43.5 (6.4)	33.9 (1.1)	52.1 (11.2)
Mean daily minimum °F (°C)	20.7 (−6.3)	22.4 (−5.3)	29.5 (−1.4)	40.5 (4.7)	50.6 (10.3)	59.8 (15.4)	65.4 (18.6)	63.9 (17.7)	56.7 (13.7)	45.6 (7.6)	35.5 (1.9)	27.1 (−2.7)	43.1 (6.2)
Record low °F (°C)	−15 (−26)	−17 (−27)	−2 (−19)	8 (−13)	25 (−4)	40 (4)	40 (4)	35 (2)	28 (−2)	20 (−7)	5 (−15)	−16 (−27)	−17 (−27)
Average precipitation inches (mm)	3.82 (97)	2.95 (75)	4.04 (103)	4.00 (102)	3.84 (98)	4.61 (117)	4.57 (116)	4.96 (126)	4.57 (116)	5.29 (134)	4.23 (107)	4.59 (117)	51.47 (1,307)
Average snowfall inches (cm)	11.1 (28)	7.1 (18)	9.6 (24)	0.4 (1.0)	0.0 (0.0)	0.0 (0.0)	0.0 (0.0)	0.0 (0.0)	0.0 (0.0)	0.0 (0.0)	0.5 (1.3)	7.0 (18)	35.7 (91)
Average precipitation days (≥ 0.01 in)	9.8	8.3	9.3	10.5	11.8	11.4	9.8	9.6	8.2	9.6	9.0	10.4	117.7
Average snowy days (≥ 0.1 in)	3.8	2.4	2.0	0.2	0.0	0.0	0.0	0.0	0.0	0.0	0.2	1.9	10.5
Source: NOAA

== Demographics ==
Historical population
Census	Pop.	Note	%±
2010	6,763		—
2020	7,341		8.5%
U.S. Decennial Census

As of the census of 2020, there were 7,341 people, and 860 households residing in the CDP, with the average household size being 3.79 persons per household. The population density was 398.2 inhabitants per square mile (153.7/km^{2}). The racial makeup of the CDP was 69.3% white, 5.4% African American, 0.2% Native American, 4.4% Asian, 0.2% Pacific Islander, and 10.3% from two or more races. Hispanic or Latino of any race were 12.0% of the population. The age distribution is 23.5% under the age of 18, and 0.4% who were 65 years of age or older.

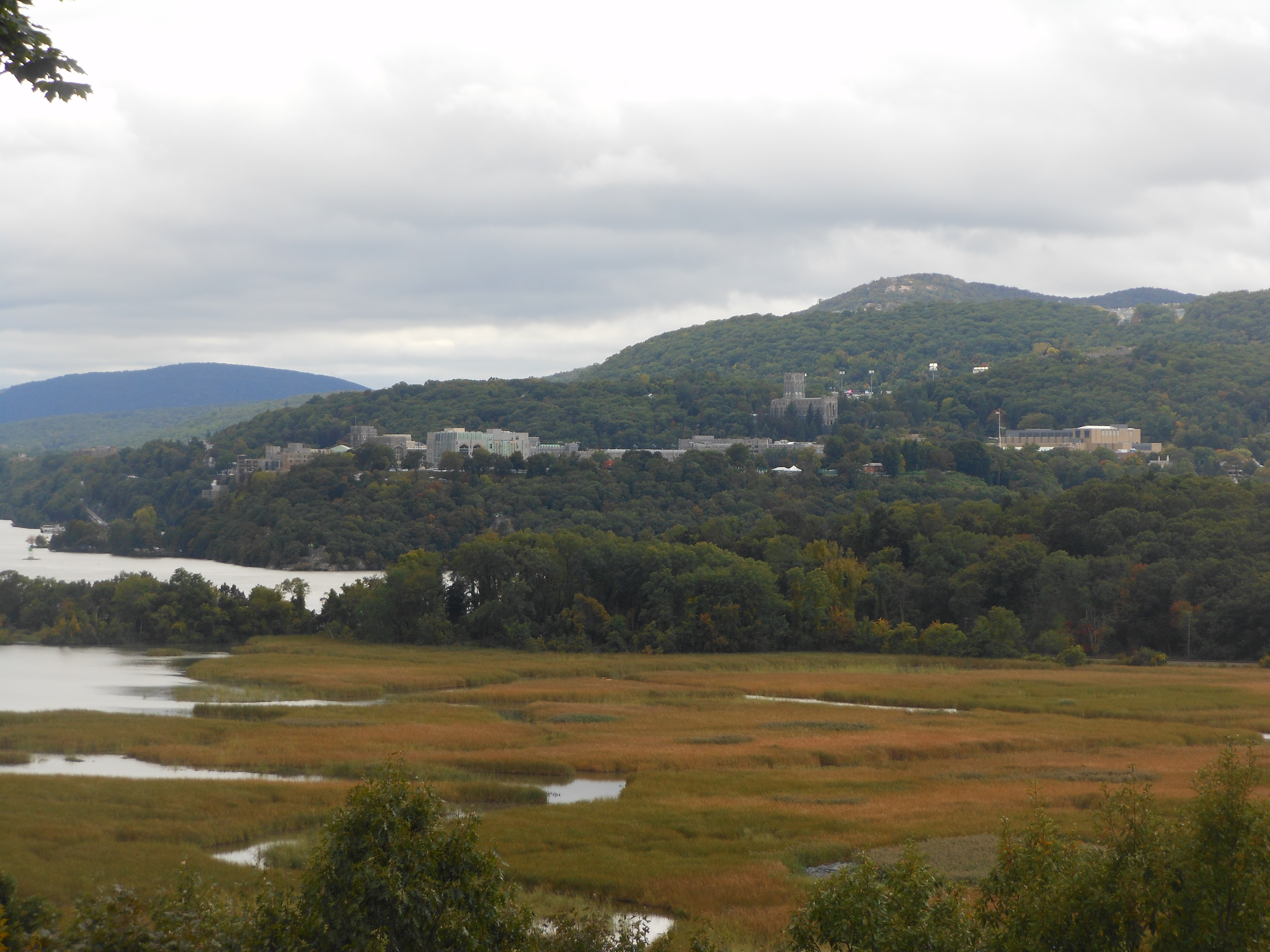
View of West Point from the eastern shore of the Hudson River

There were 860 households, out of which 79.5% were a married couple family household, 16.4% had a female householder with no spouse present, and 3.3% had a male householder with no spouse present. The average household size was 3.79. The median income for a household in the CDP was $121,219.

About 2.3% of the population is below the poverty line.

== West Point Mint ==
In 1937, the West Point Bullion Depository was constructed and, in 1938, opened to store silver bullion. In 1988, it became the West Point Mint, as a branch of the United States Mint and gained official status as a branch of the United States Mint on March 31 of that year. The West Point Mint has a deep storage of 54,067,331.379 fine troy ounces of gold. It sits on a 4-acre (1.6 ha) parcel of land.

== Notable people ==
- Tony Hale, actor
- Edith Hoyt, painter
- Alfred Thayer Mahan, naval historian
- Ricky Steamboat, professional wrestler
- Gore Vidal, author

== Transportation ==
U.S. Route 9W, combined with NY Route 218 run north-south through West Point. New York Route 293 also runs northeast-southwest through the post. Running through the lower portion of the town is U.S. Route 6, combined with the upper extent of the Palisades Interstate Parkway.

The New York Central Railroad well into the 1950s operated several passenger trains a day on the West Shore Railroad through the academy's Gothic style station; both the limited stop trains bound for Albany and the local trains to Newburgh and Kingston made stops at the station. Service finally ended in 1958.

=== Train station gallery ===
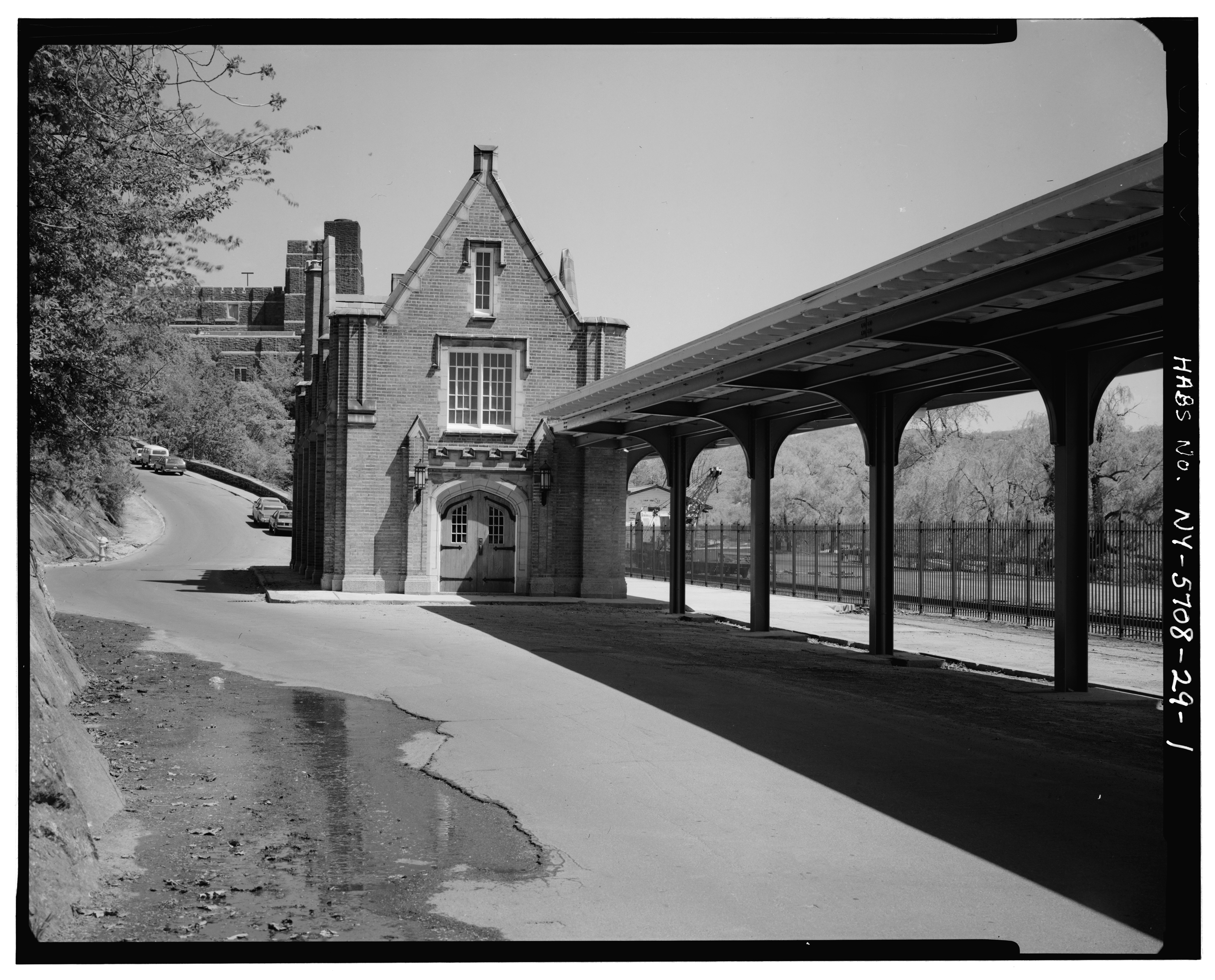
View of the West Shore Railroad station, looking north (ca. 1980)

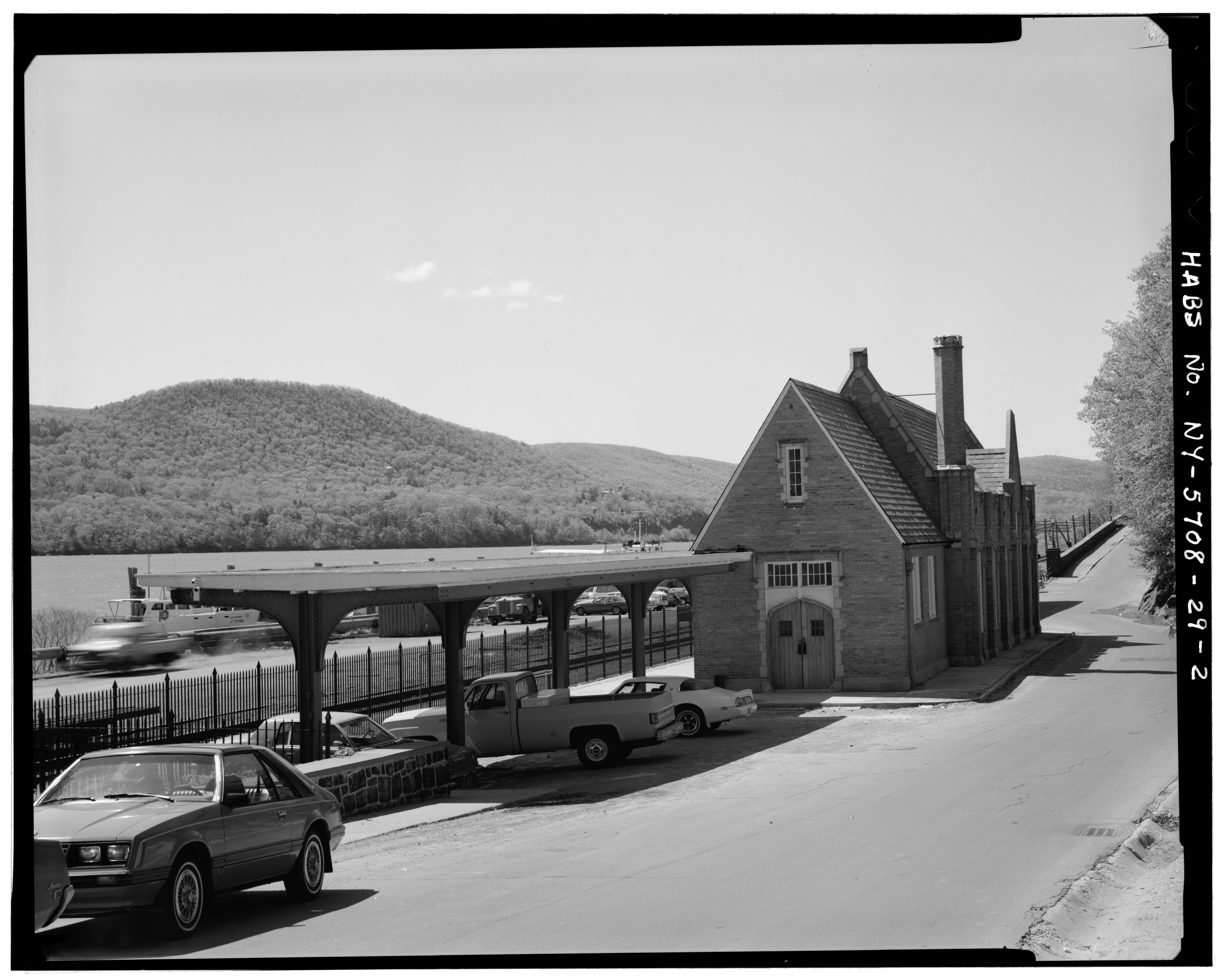
View of station, looking south (ca. 1980)

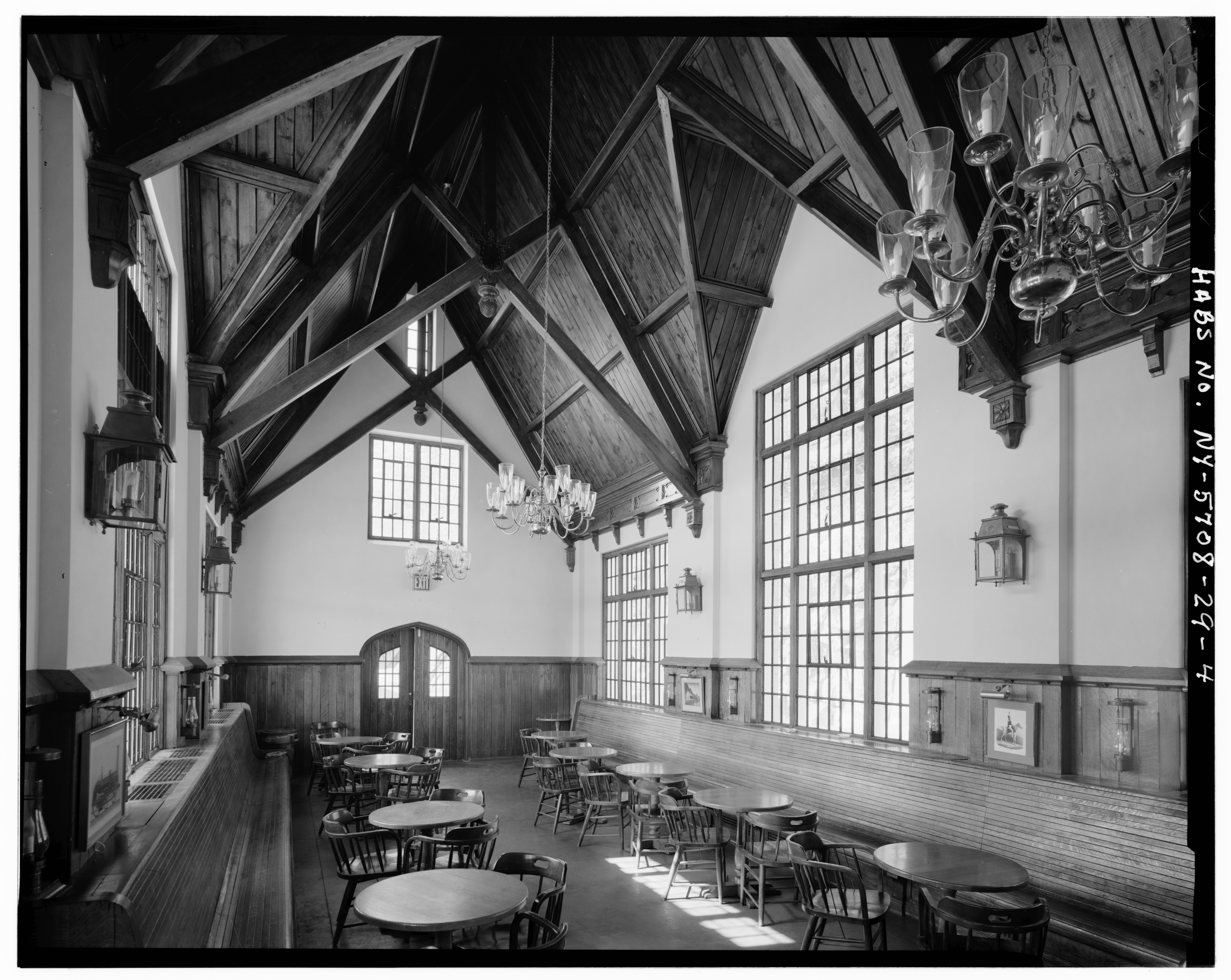
Station interior

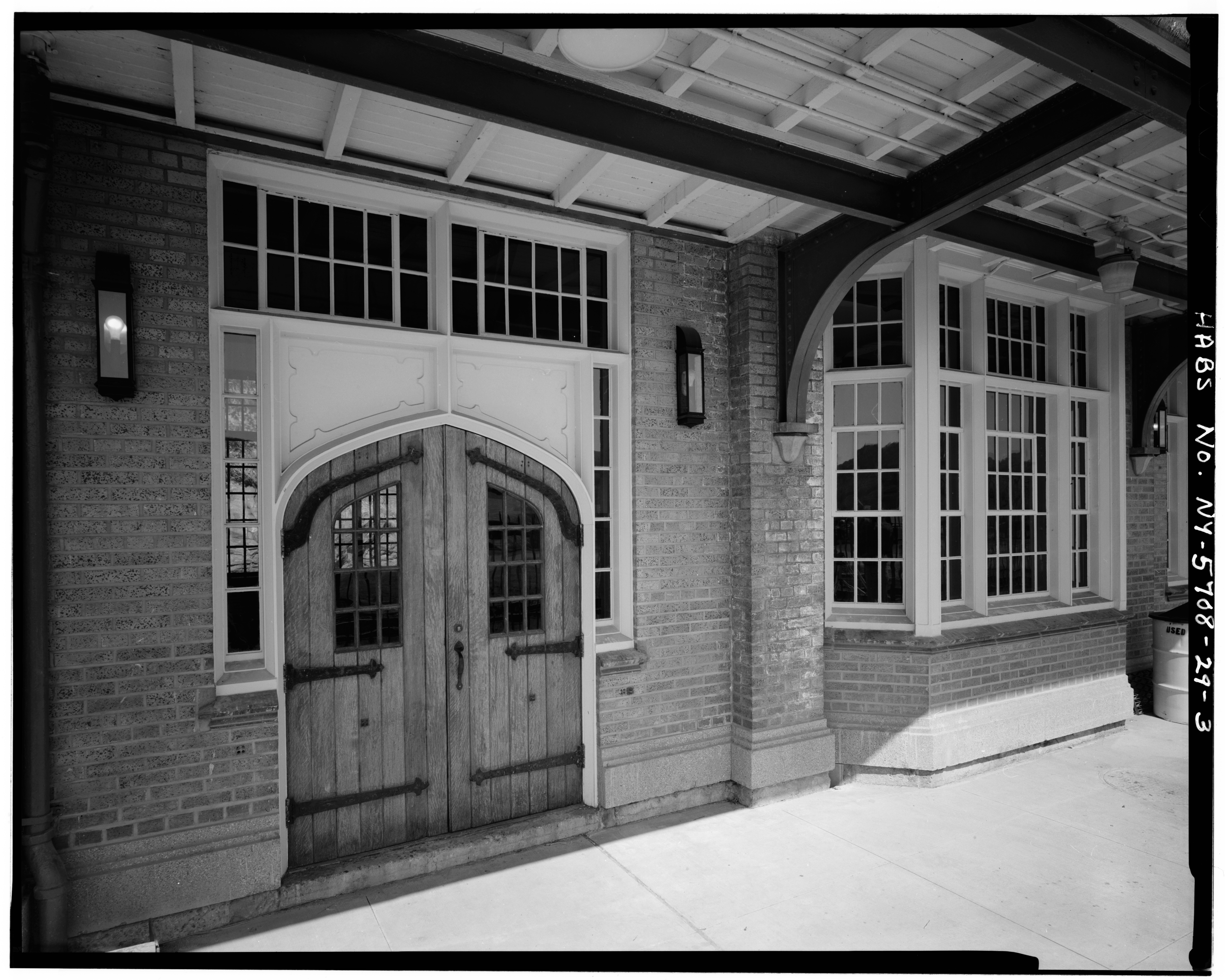
Entry door, trackside view

== Education ==
Highland Falls-Fort Montgomery Central School District is the local school district. James I. O'Neill High School is its high school.

The Department of Defense Education Activity (DoDEA) maintains elementary and middle schools for children of military personnel on-post at USMA, but sends high school aged students who are dependents of on-base military personnel to O'Neill. In March 2022 USMA's contract with O'Neill was renewed.
