= Hoit =

Hoit may refer to:

== People ==
- Albert Gallatin Hoit (1809-1856), American painter
- Henry F. Hoit (1872–1951), American architect

== Places ==
- Hoit, Tajikistan

== See also ==
- Hoyt (disambiguation)
