= Hoyt Street =

Hoyt Street may refer to the following stations of the New York City Subway in Brooklyn:

- Hoyt Street (IRT Eastern Parkway Line), serving the 2 and 3 trains
- Hoyt–Schermerhorn Streets (New York City Subway); a station complex consisting of:
  - Hoyt–Schermerhorn Streets (IND Fulton Street Line), serving the A and C trains
  - Hoyt–Schermerhorn Streets (IND Crosstown Line), serving the G train
