= James Hoyte =

Fijian footballer

Personal information
- Full name: James Hoyte
- Place of birth: Fiji
- Position: Midfielder

Senior career*
Years	Team	Apps	(Gls)
- Mount Roskill
1989	Weston-super-Mare		
- Mangotsfield United
- Tytherington Rocks
1997	Walton Casuals	4	(1)
- Tytherington Rocks

International career
1985–2011	Fiji	4	(0)
- * Club domestic league appearances and goals

James Hoyte is a Fijian footballer who was capped four times for the Fiji national team after playing spells in Fiji, Australia and England. He last played for Tytherington Rocks.

== Career ==
In 1985, Hoyte represented Fiji at the Oceania Under-20 Youth Cup. On 15 February, he scored twice in the opening game, a 5-1 victory over Papua New Guinea. He played in all five matches as Fiji finished fifth in the competition. He scored 12 times for the youth set-up prior to becoming Fiji's youngest ever international aged 16.

Hoyte won four caps with the senior side in 1985 and 1986. After political and civil unrest in Fiji, Hoyte moved to New Zealand where he spent three years with Auckland-based semi-professional club Mount Roskill.

Following a move to England in 1989, an unsuccessful trial with West Ham United almost led to an early retirement. However, Hoyte joined non-league clubs Weston-Super-Mare and Mangotsfield United while developing his business. He was later forced to quit football to focus on work commitments, but in 1994 joined Bristol Suburban League club Tytherington Rocks in order to keep himself fit.

In August 1997, Hoyte joined Combined Counties Football League club Walton Casuals for a brief spell. On 30 August, he scored on his debut in a 1-1 draw at Hartley Wintney. Hoyte was sent off in a 0-0 draw at Viking Greenford on 16 September, and made his final appearance for the club four days later.

In 2001, Hoyte was called up to the Fiji national team after a 15-year absence. After receiving an email from a Tytherington Rocks supporter, national coach Billy Singh, who handed Hoyte his international debut back in 1985, tracked the midfielder down ahead of the 2002 World Cup Qualifying fixtures.

Upon his call-up to the international squad, Hoyte trained with Second Division side Bristol City to reach match fitness before flying out to join the national team.
