= Highland Falls, New York =

- Village
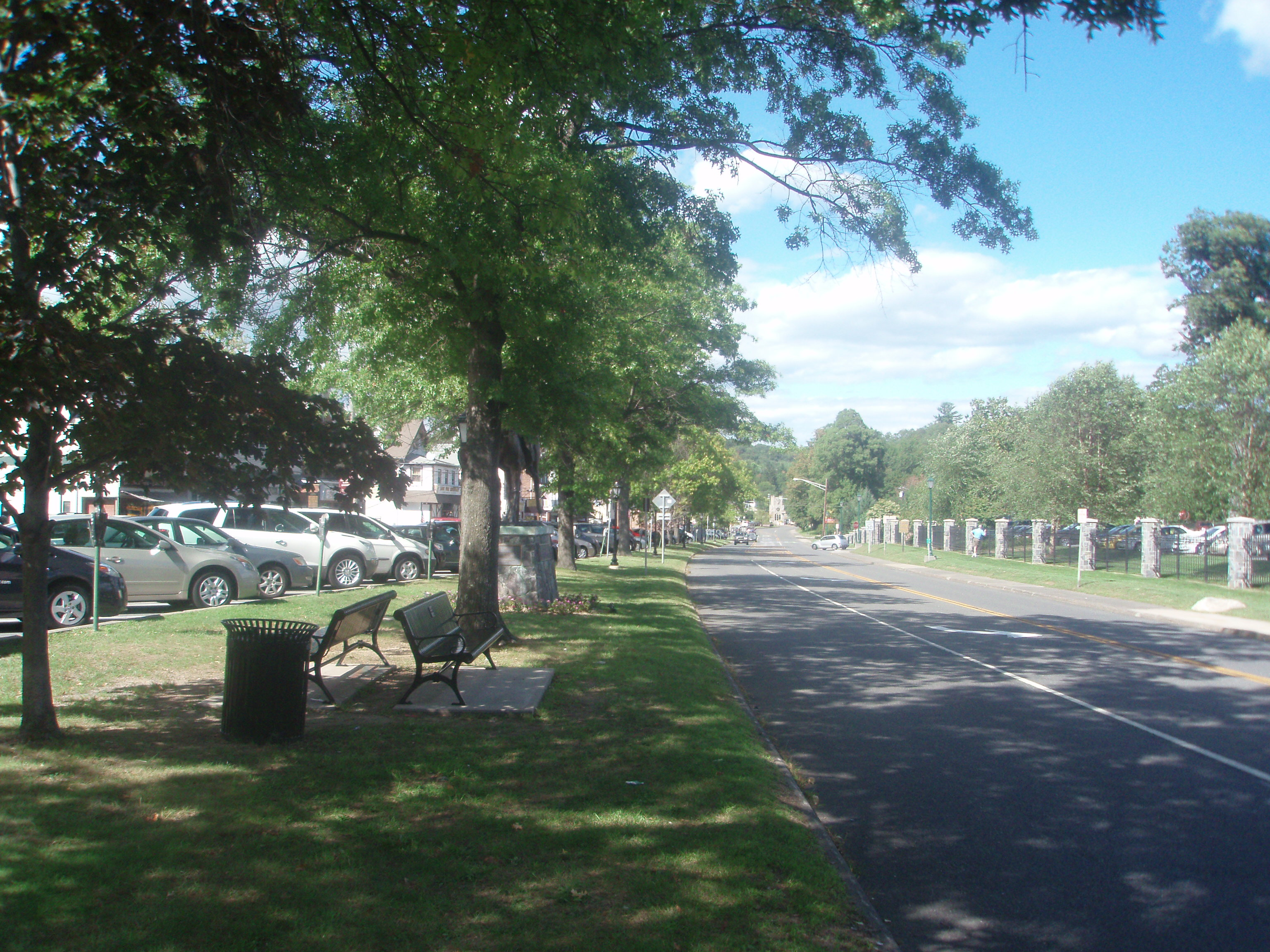

- Location in Orange County and the state of New York.

- Location within the state of New York
- Coordinates: 41°22′7″N 73°58′5″W
- Country: United States
- State: New York
- County: Orange

Area
  - Total: 1.10 sq mi (2.86 km^{2})
  - Land: 1.09 sq mi (2.83 km^{2})
  - Water: 0.0077 sq mi (0.02 km^{2})
- Elevation: 144 ft (44 m)

Population (2020)
  - Total: 3,684
  - Density: 3,368.6/sq mi (1,300.62/km^{2})
- Time zone: UTC-5 (Eastern (EST))
  - Summer (DST): UTC-4 (EDT)
- ZIP code: 10928
- Area code: 845
- FIPS code: 36-34495
- GNIS feature ID: 0970209
- Website: www.highlandfallsny.org

Highland Falls, formerly named Buttermilk Falls, is a village in Orange County, New York, United States. The population was 3,684 at the 2020 census. The village was founded in 1906. It is part of the Kiryas Joel–Poughkeepsie–Newburgh metropolitan area as well as the larger New York metropolitan area.

Highland Falls is in the Town of Highlands and is adjacent to the United States Military Academy at West Point.

== Geography ==
Highland Falls is located at 41°22′7″N 73°58′5″W.

According to the United States Census Bureau, the village has a total area of 1.1 square miles (2.8 km^{2}), of which 1.1 square miles (2.8 km^{2}) is land and 0.89% is water.

== Demographics ==
Historical population
Census	Pop.	Note	%±
1880	1,976		—
1890	2,237		13.2%
1910	2,470		—
1920	2,588		4.8%
1930	2,910		12.4%
1940	3,711		27.5%
1950	3,930		5.9%
1960	4,469		13.7%
1970	4,638		3.8%
1980	4,187		−9.7%
1990	3,937		−6.0%
2000	3,678		−6.6%
2010	3,900		6.0%
2020	3,684		−5.5%
U.S. Decennial Census

=== 2020 census ===
As of the 2020 census, Highland Falls had a population of 3,684. The median age was 40.2 years. 19.7% of residents were under the age of 18 and 15.7% of residents were 65 years of age or older. For every 100 females there were 94.9 males, and for every 100 females age 18 and over there were 93.6 males age 18 and over.

100.0% of residents lived in urban areas, while 0.0% lived in rural areas.

There were 1,595 households in Highland Falls, of which 27.1% had children under the age of 18 living in them. Of all households, 37.3% were married-couple households, 22.6% were households with a male householder and no spouse or partner present, and 32.5% were households with a female householder and no spouse or partner present. About 34.8% of all households were made up of individuals and 11.3% had someone living alone who was 65 years of age or older.

There were 1,772 housing units, of which 10.0% were vacant. The homeowner vacancy rate was 2.1% and the rental vacancy rate was 6.5%.

Racial composition as of the 2020 census
Race	Number	Percent
White	2,100	57.0%
Black or African American	561	15.2%
American Indian and Alaska Native	54	1.5%
Asian	110	3.0%
Native Hawaiian and Other Pacific Islander	3	0.1%
Some other race	441	12.0%
Two or more races	415	11.3%
Hispanic or Latino (of any race)	947	25.7%

=== 2010 census ===
As of the 2010 census, there were 3,900 people, 1,647 households, and 988 families residing in the village. The population density was 3,546.1 inhabitants per square mile (1,369.2/km^{2}). There were 1,793 housing units at an average density of 1,630.3 per square mile (629.5/km^{2}). The racial makeup of the village was 70.4% White, 13.0% African American, 2.3% Asian, 0.8% Native American or Alaskan Native, 9.1% from other races, and 4.4% from two or more races. 18.7% of the population were Hispanic or Latino of any race.

There were 1,647 households, out of which 29.5% had children under the age of 18 living with them, 40.9% were married couples living together, 14.1% had a female householder with no husband present, and 40.0% were non-families. 34.5% of all households were made up of individuals, and 10.9% had someone living alone who was 65 years of age or older. The average household size was 2.37 and the average family size was 3.07.

In the village, the population was spread out, with 22.1% under the age of 18, 8.2% from 18 to 24, 27.9% from 25 to 44, 28.6% from 45 to 64, and 13.2% who were 65 years of age or older. The median age was 40.2 years. For every 100 females, there were 97.1 males. For every 100 females age 18 and over, there were 92.9 males.

=== Income and poverty ===
The estimated median income for a household in the village was $65,192, and the estimated median income for a family was $73,672. Males had an estimated median income of $47,069 versus $43,654 for females. The estimated per capita income for the village was $29,006. About 11.6% of families and 10.9% of the population were below the poverty line, including 14.0% of those under age 18 and 9.7% of those age 65 or over.

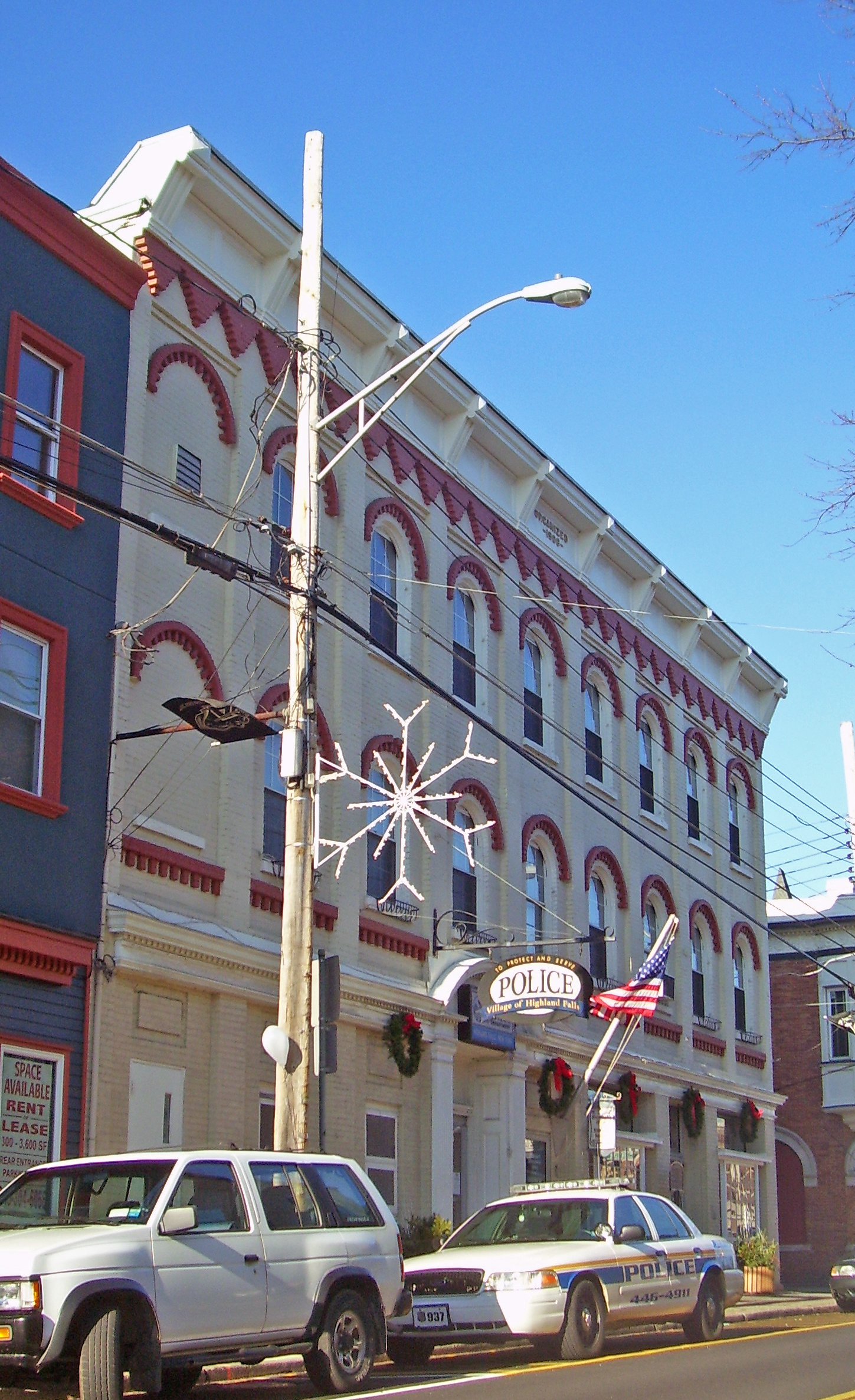
Village Hall, listed on the National Register of Historic Places

== Education ==
Highland Falls is part of the Highland Falls-Fort Montgomery Central School District. The district has three campuses – Fort Montgomery Elementary School (Grades K-2), Highland Falls Intermediate School (Grades 3-8), and James I. O'Neill High School (Grades 9-12).

There was also a parochial school, Sacred Heart of Jesus School, of the Roman Catholic Archdiocese of New York, that served students in grades pre-kindergarten through eight. The school opened in 1930 and closed in 2011. The archdiocese suggested that parents send their children to St. Gregory Barbarigo School in Garnerville.

Ladycliff Academy existed in the Village of Highland Falls from 1900 to 1961. Ladycliff College existed on the same campus from 1933 to 1981. This campus was located on lands formerly known as Cranston's Hotel, and before that Cozzen's Hotel on the east side of the village overlooking the Hudson River.

== Notable people ==
- Charles Durning, television and film actor
- Anne Morgan, philanthropist, daughter of banker J.P. Morgan
- Dick Scott, three-time All-American football player for the Navy Midshipmen and member of the College Football Hall of Fame
- Billy Joel, musician
- Charles Francis Roe, military officer
