= Salisbury Mills–Cornwall station =

Metro-North Railroad station in New York

Salisbury Mills– Cornwall
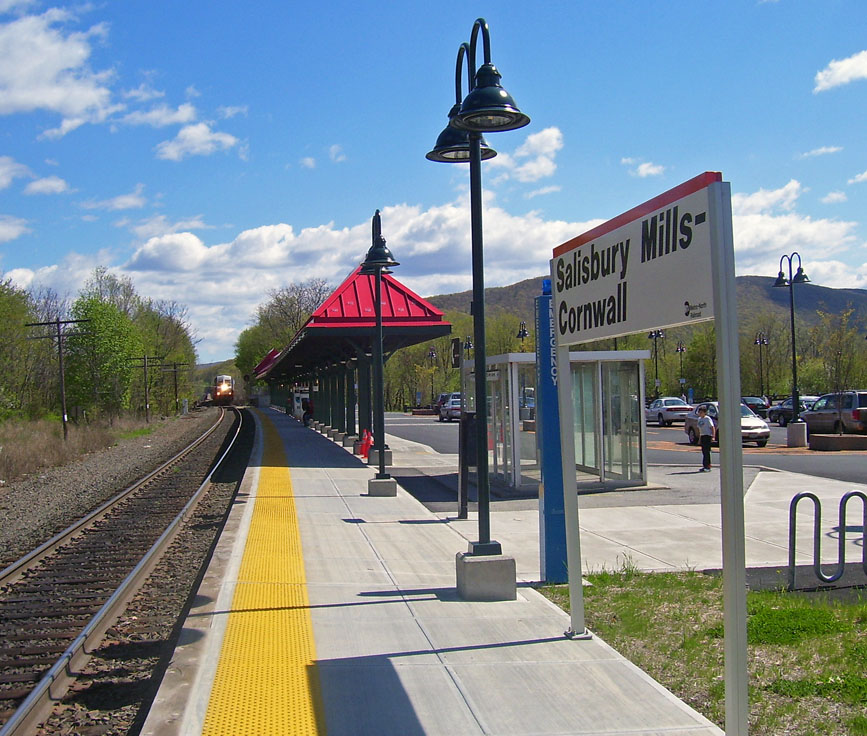
- Salisbury Mills–Cornwall station platform

General information
- Location: 1600 State Highway 94; Salisbury Mills, New York
- Coordinates: 41°26′15″N 74°06′12″W
- Owner: Metro-North Railroad
- Line: NS Southern Tier Line
- Platforms: 1 side platform
- Tracks: 1

Construction
- Structure type: At-grade
- Parking: 677 spaces
- Accessible: Yes

History
- Opened: April 18, 1983

Services
Preceding station	Metro-North Railroad	Following station
Campbell Hall toward Port Jervis	Port Jervis Line	Harriman toward Hoboken
Location

Salisbury Mills–Cornwall station is a commuter railroad station in the Beaver Dam Lake section of the town of Cornwall, Orange County, New York. Located on State Route 94 (NY 94), the station serves trains of Metro-North Railroad's Port Jervis Line, operated by NJ Transit between Hoboken Terminal in Hoboken, New Jersey to Port Jervis station in Port Jervis, New York. The station sits at the northern end of the Moodna Viaduct, a 3,200-foot (980 m) steel trestle through the Moodna Creek valley. Salisbury Mills–Cornwall station has a single canopy-covered low-level side platform and small high-level platform via a ramp for handicap accessibility. The station serves as a park and ride with a 677 space parking lot.

== History ==
The station, located on the former Erie Railroad Graham Line, a former freight-only bypass route, opened on April 18, 1983 when the Metropolitan Transportation Authority moved service off the former Erie main line to the Graham Line. The Erie formerly served the hamlet of Salisbury Mills via its Newburgh Branch from January 8, 1850 to April 25, 1936, and served Cornwall via the Newburgh Shortcut.

== Station layout ==
The station has one track and a low-level side platform.

Parking fees are charged on weekdays, with both permit and metered spaces available. Salisbury Mills–Cornwall station contains a large parking lot, lighting, elongated canopy and a mini high-level platform for wheelchair access to trains.
