= Otisville station =

Metro-North Railroad station in New York

Otisville
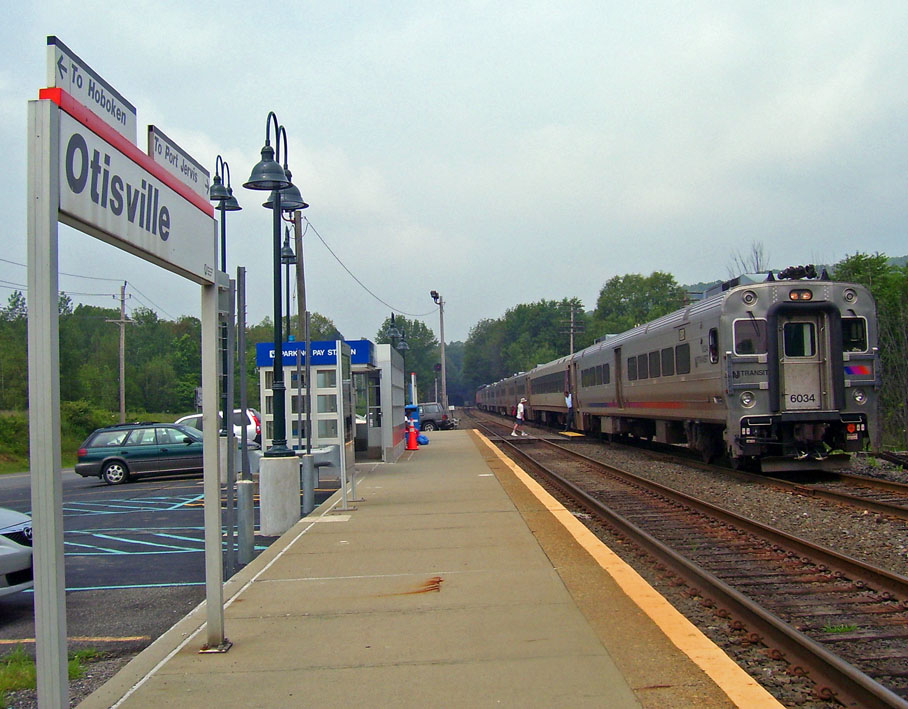
- Hoboken-bound train arriving at Otisville station.

General information
- Location: 1 Kelly Hill Road; Otisville, New York
- Coordinates: 41°28′18″N 74°31′45″W
- Owner: Metro-North Railroad
- Line: NS Southern Tier Line
- Platforms: 1 side platform
- Tracks: 2

Construction
- Structure type: At-grade
- Parking: 151 spaces
- Accessible: No

History
- Opened: November 1, 1846
- Rebuilt: 1954

Services
Preceding station	Metro-North Railroad	Following station
Port Jervis Terminus	Port Jervis Line	Middletown–Town of Wallkill toward Hoboken
Former services
Preceding station	Metro-North Railroad	Following station
Port Jervis Terminus	Port Jervis Line	Middletown Closed 1983 toward Hoboken
Preceding station	Erie Railroad	Following station
Graham toward Chicago	Main Line	Howells toward Jersey City
Location

Otisville station is a commuter railroad station in the town of Mount Hope, Orange County, New York. Located on Kelly Hill Road just west of the intersection with State Route 211 east of the Otisville village line, Otisville station services trains of Metro-North Railroad's Port Jervis Line between Hoboken Terminal in Hoboken, New Jersey and Port Jervis station in the eponymous Port Jervis. The service is operated by NJ Transit through contract with Metro-North Railroad. The station consists of a single low-level uncovered side platform without handicap accessibility and two parking lots (one alongside the platform and one across Kelly Hill Road) that offers 151 parking spaces. Otisville station sits east of Otisville Tunnel, a 5,314-foot (1,620 m) tunnel through Shawangunk Ridge. With the tunnel, a passenger siding exists at Otisville station to facilitate movement between trains. A wooden plankboard connects the side platform to the siding track for boarding.

The current station at Otisville opened in 1954 when the Erie Railroad moved services from their main line west of Howells to Guymard to their freight only bypass, the Graham Line.

== History ==
Otisville station opened on November 1, 1846 as part of the extension of the New York, Lake Erie and Western Railroad (later Erie Railroad) from Middletown, which had been the terminus since May 26, 1843. This remained the case until December 31, 1847, when service was extended to Port Jervis. The station was moved to its current location in January 1954 when the Erie realigned tracks between Howells and Graham station (in Guymard) onto the Graham Line, abandoning 11 miles (18 km) of the former main line.

== Station layout ==
The station has two tracks and a low-level side platform with a pathway connecting the platform to the bypass track.

== Bibliography ==
- Hungerford, Edward (1946). Men of Erie: A Story of Human Effort. New York, New York: Random House. OCLC 500324.
