= Middletown–Town of Wallkill station =

Metro-North Railroad station in New York

Middletown Town of Wallkill
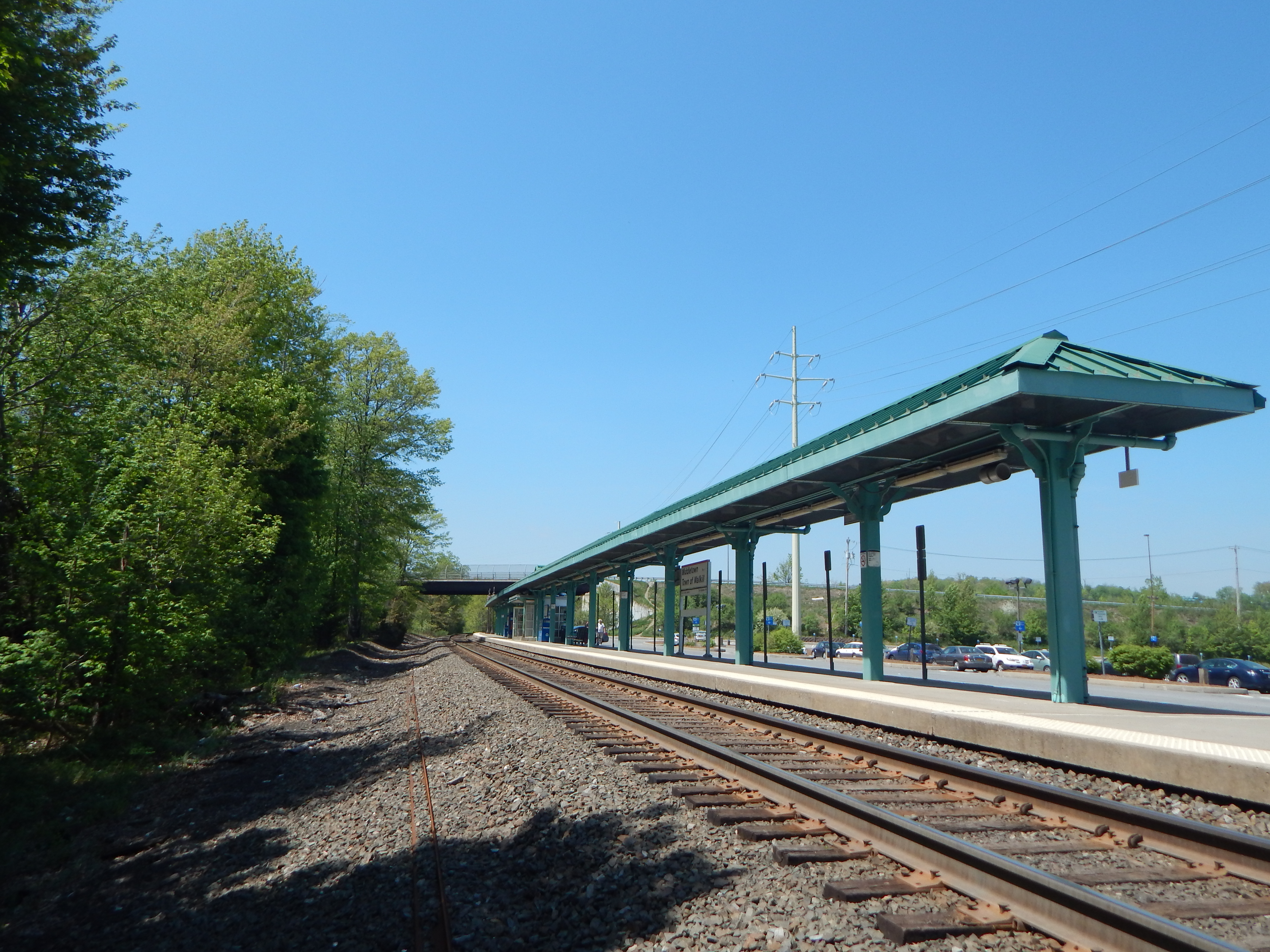
- Middletown–Town of Wallkill station in May 2015

General information
- Location: Healy Lane at North Galleria Drive; Middletown, New York
- Coordinates: 41°27′27″N 74°22′14″W
- Owner: Metro-North Railroad
- Line: NS Southern Tier Line
- Platforms: 1 side platform
- Tracks: 1
- Connections: Transit Orange: Middletown Route 3, Main Line (on North Galleria Drive)

Construction
- Structure type: At-grade
- Parking: 750 spaces
- Accessible: Yes

History
- Opened: April 18, 1983

Services
Preceding station	Metro-North Railroad	Following station
Otisville toward Port Jervis	Port Jervis Line	Campbell Hall toward Hoboken
Location

Middletown–Town of Wallkill station is an active commuter railroad station in the town of Wallkill, Orange County, New York. Located in a parking lot off North Galleria Drive (the access road to the Galleria at Crystal Run from State Route 211), the station serves trains of Metro-North Railroad's Port Jervis Line, which operates between Hoboken Terminal in Hoboken, New Jersey and Port Jervis station in Port Jervis, New York, operated by NJ Transit. Two trains during the day terminate at Middletown–Town of Wallkill station instead of going the full distance. Middletown–Town of Wallkill station has a single low-level side platform with a small high-level platform to facilitate handicap accessibility. The station also serves as a park and ride, with a 750-space parking lot. Local bus services are available on North Galleria Drive, operated by Transit Orange.

Middletown–Town of Wallkill station opened on April 18, 1983 when all service on the Port Jervis Line was moved from the former Erie Railroad main line from Mount Hope to Harriman, New York to the former Erie Graham Line. Middletown–Town of Wallkill station replaced the former Erie Railroad station on James Street, which today serves as the Thrall Library.

== History ==
The station replaced the former Erie Railroad station on James Street in Middletown, which maintained service from May 26, 1843 to April 15, 1983. That building now serves as the Thrall Library. Middletown–Town of Wallkill station opened on April 18, 1983.

== Station layout ==
The station has one track and a low-level side platform.
