= Moodna Viaduct =

Bridge in Salisbury Mills, New York

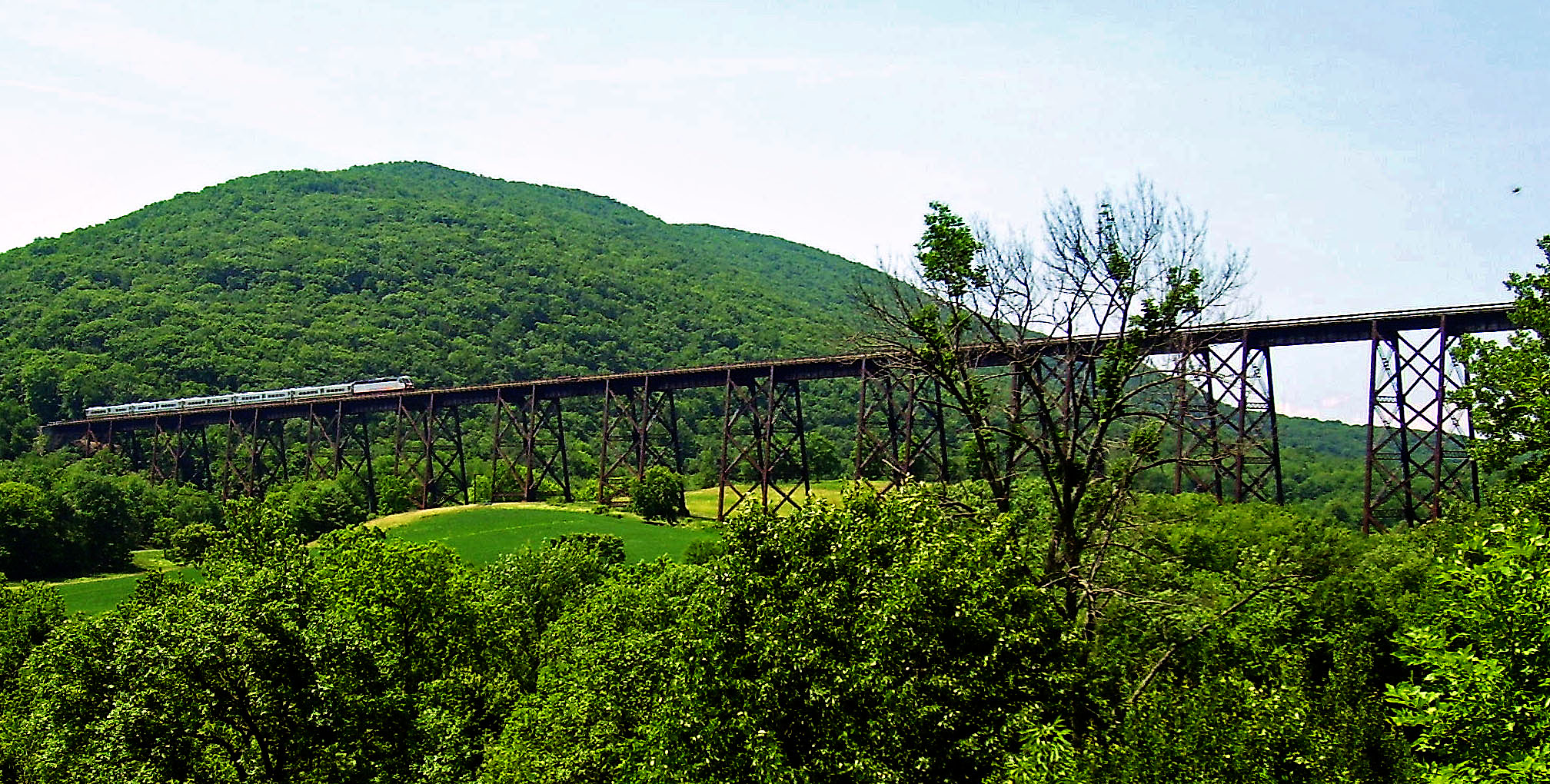
- A Metro-North Port Jervis Line train crossing the Moodna
- Coordinates: 41°25′49″N 74°05′57″W
- Carries: 1 track of Norfolk Southern's Southern Tier Line
- Crosses: Moodna Creek
- Locale: Salisbury Mills, New York
- Maintained by: Metro-North Railroad (owned by Norfolk Southern)

Characteristics
- Design: Trestle
- Total length: 3,200 feet (980 m)
- Clearance below: 193 feet (59 m)

History
- Opened: January 1909

Location
- Interactive map of Moodna Viaduct

The Moodna Viaduct is a steel railroad trestle spanning Moodna Creek and its valley at the north end of Schunemunk Mountain in Cornwall, New York, near the hamlet of Salisbury Mills.

== Significance ==
The bridge was constructed between 1906 and 1909 by the Erie Railroad as part of its Graham Line freight bypass, and was opened for service in January 1909. The trestle spans the valley for 3,200 feet (975 m) and is 193 feet (59 m) high at its highest point, making it the highest and longest railroad trestle east of the Mississippi River still in use for rail traffic (The longest and highest trestle bridge still standing east of the Mississippi River is the 1889 Poughkeepsie Bridge of the New York, New Haven and Hartford Railroad however it ended rail service in 1974 and was converted to a pedestrian bridge in 2009). Apart from the valley below, the viaduct crosses two roads (Otterkill Road and Orrs Mills Road), the Moodna Creek, and the Erie Railroad's now-abandoned Newburgh Branch. The open design of the trestle was used to reduce wind resistance and is a major reason why the trestle is still in service today.

== Current use ==
The viaduct carries New Jersey Transit/Metro-North Port Jervis commuter line trains and Norfolk Southern freight trains. The Metro-North Salisbury Mills–Cornwall station sits near the north end of the viaduct. In summer 2007, timber replacement on the viaduct caused delays on the line due to slow orders placed on it, and required that service be halted during weekend days. Repairs were made to several of the concrete piers in October 2009, but traffic remained uninterrupted.

The viaduct is a tourist attraction for the small town of Salisbury Mills. Three roads cross under the viaduct, the highest-traffic of them being Orange County Route 94. The viaduct creates a spectacular landscape when viewed from the corner of Orrs Mills Road and Jackson Avenue outside of town, frequently photographed during fall foliage season.

The Moodna Viaduct appears as a prominent feature in the 2007 film Michael Clayton and in the 2020 film The Half of It.

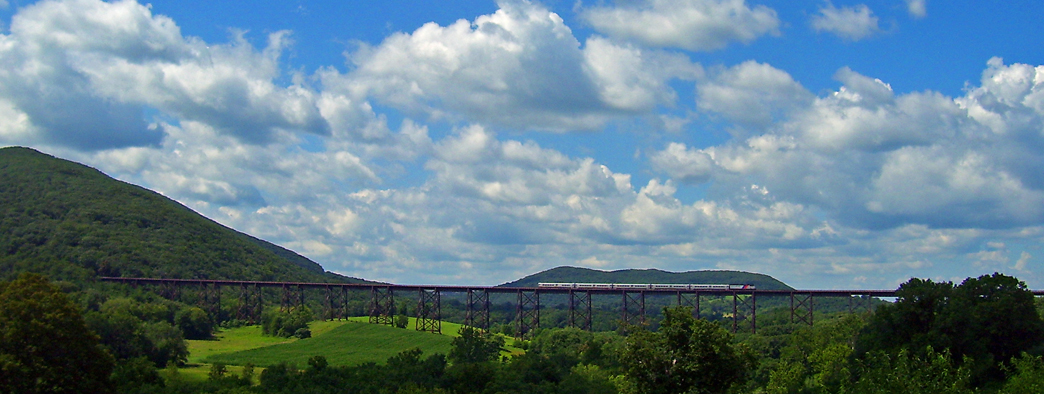
A train crossing the viaduct from Orrs Mill Road to Jackson Avenue

== Gallery ==
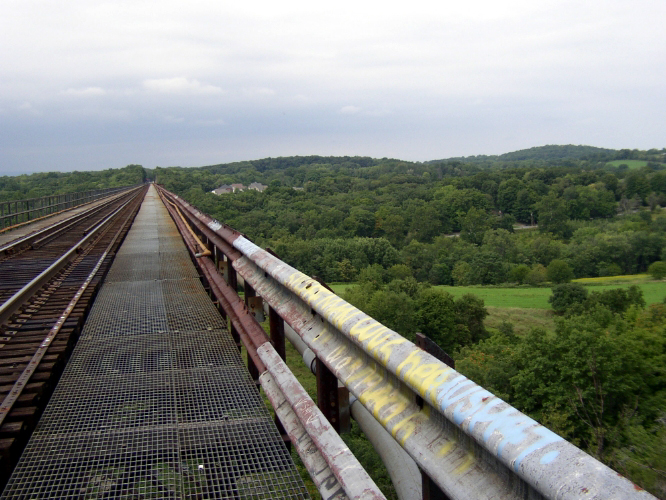
View point across the length of the Moodna Viaduct from one of the ends.

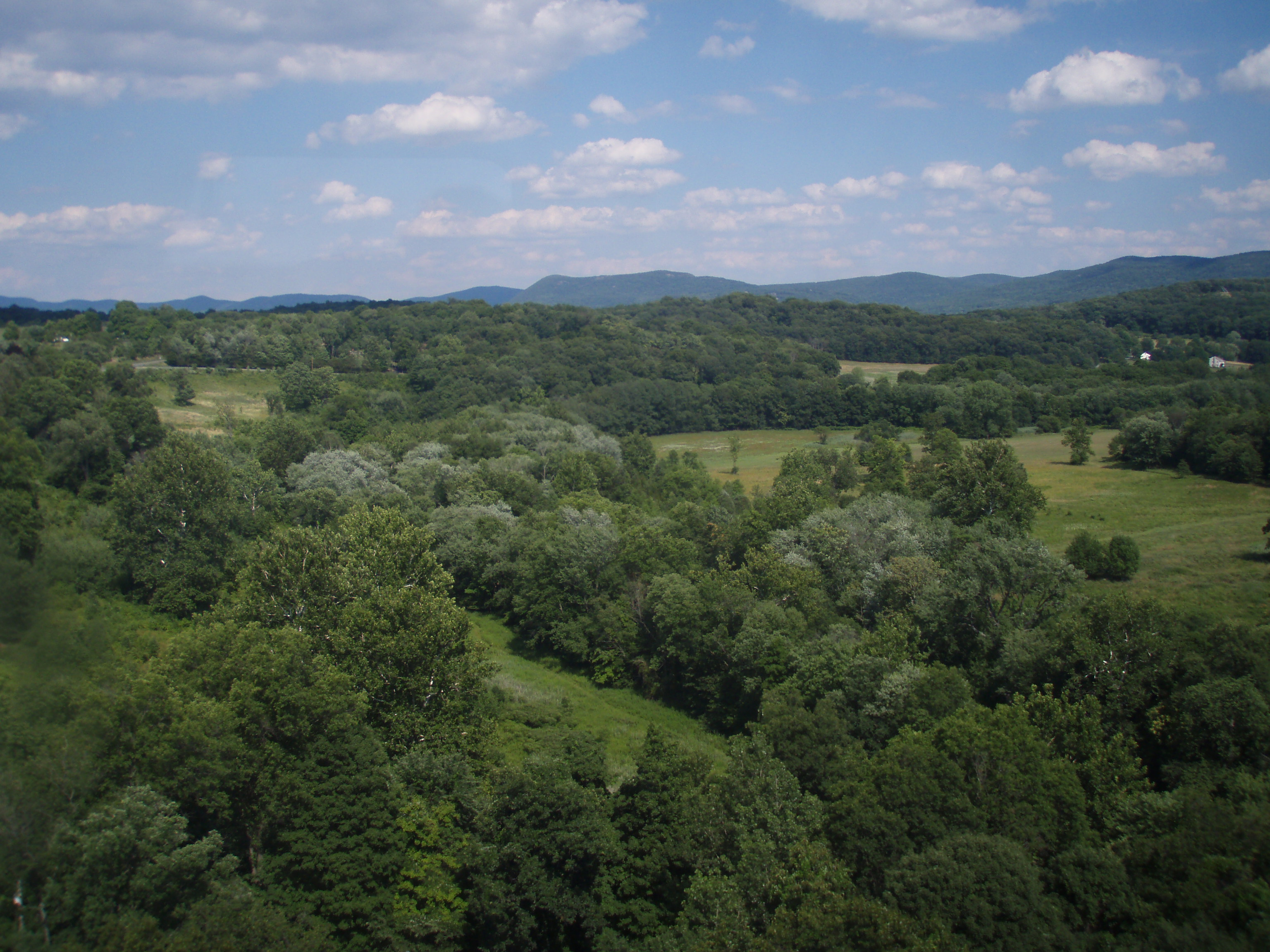
View from Moodna Viaduct looking east.

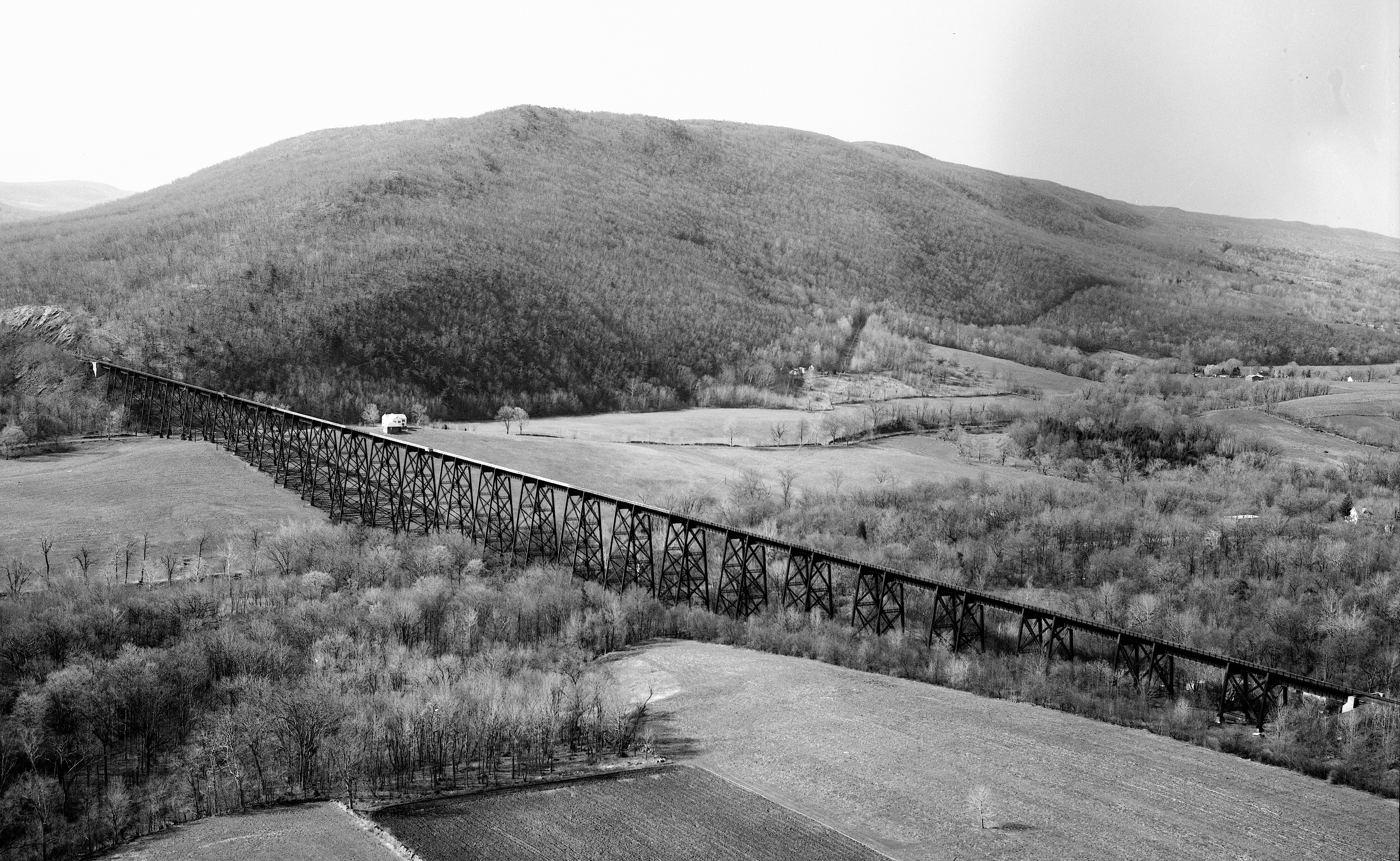
View of the Moodna Viaduct in 1971.

== See also ==
- List of bridges documented by the Historic American Engineering Record in New York (state)
- List of Erie Railroad structures documented by the Historic American Engineering Record
