= Newburgh Branch =

Overview
- Owner: New York and Newburgh Railroad (1850–1869); Erie Railroad (1869–1976); Conrail (1976–1984)
- Termini: Greycourt, New York; Newburgh, New York

History
- Opened: 1850
- Closed: 1937 (passenger service ended); 1977 (fully abandoned); 1984-85 (tracks and infrastructure removed)

Technical
- Line length: 19 mi (31 km)
- Number of tracks: 1
- Track gauge: 1,435 mm (4 ft 8 1/2 in) standard gauge

The Erie Railroad Newburgh Branch is a mostly abandoned branch line that travels across the center of Orange County, New York. It survives as the CSX Vails Gate Spur between Newburgh and Vails Gate, but is abandoned between Vails Gate and the end of the line in Greycourt. When it opened in 1850, it was Newburgh's first railroad and remained the only line serving the city for over three decades until the first train operated from Newburgh along the West Shore Railroad in 1883.

== Route ==
The line starts out at a junction with the River Subdivision (formerly the New York Central's West Shore Railroad) just south of Newburgh, then climbs onto a bridge, crossing the River Subdivision and River Street in Newburgh. At one point, there was also a yard at this location that has since been abandoned. It then abruptly turns west, passing through the town of New Windsor. At West Newburgh, the line again turns southwest past the site where there was once an engine house, turntable, and six-track yard. There was also a station at West Newburgh. The branch's ROW leaves the existing tracks at Vails Gate Junction, just south of Route 300, and these tracks presently end just past a grade crossing at Route 94, south of Vails Gate Junction. The route the tracks take is the route of the Newburgh Shortcut line, which branched off towards the Graham Line, eventually merging at Newburgh Junction. The abandoned ROW then crosses I-87, before briefly running parallel with the Newburgh Shortcut. Soon, the line turns west and goes through the valley cut by Moodna Creek, where it passed over Jackson Avenue on a bridge, removed in 1985. The ROW continues roughly following Moodna Creek before crossing under the Moodna Viaduct, which now carries Metro-North's Port Jervis Line, formerly the Erie's (Graham Line), originally built as a high-speed freight bypass to the Erie Main. After passing through the hamlet of Salisbury Mills, it crosses Moodna Creek on the first of five truss bridges. It then crosses back to the other side of the creek, on a bridge that is now in the middle of a forest. The third bridge takes the line into Washingtonville. The last surviving station was located here, but it was completely destroyed by fire in the 1990s. Then, it crosses the creek twice more before turning south and running through open fields. After crossing over Route 94 again, this time on an overpass, it skirts the rather large swamp that is situated north of Greycourt, then ends at a wye in the Main Line, which can still somewhat be seen today on the Orange Heritage Trail. This was the former site of a large interchange rail yard with trains on the Erie Main, as well as the L&HR. The only remnant of this yard is a short Norfolk Southern siding off the NYS&W mainline, which was formerly a connection to the yard for the L&HR.

== History ==
The line opened in 1850 as the New York and Newburgh Rail Road, linking the bustling river port city of Newburgh with the Erie Main Line in Greycourt. In 1869, the Erie took over, and passenger service continued under the Erie, with many trains continuing directly from Pavonia Terminal in Jersey City, where ferries were available to Manhattan. However, service soon declined, and by 1935, there were only four trains per day, albeit all continuing directly from Pavonia. However, by 1938, passenger service had ended along the branch, and only freight service remained. Freight service was merged into Erie Lackawanna in 1960, along with the rest of the Erie Railroad. Eventually, the line started using leased Central Railroad of New Jersey locomotives, and by the early 1970s, a single EMD GP7 was the main motive power for the local freight down the branch, usually having less than 20 cars. By March 1974, the line only had two weekly freight trains, and even with the takeover of Conrail in 1976, freight service was on the decline, and ended on December 28, 1977. The tracks were taken out in 1983–1984, but all the bridges over Moodna Creek remain.

== Stations ==
There were eight stations along the route, plus two shared with other railroads at the endpoints. According to a 1935 timetable, two years before passenger service ended, there were a total of four passenger trains a day. New Windsor and West Newburgh stations were flag stops, partially because the main purpose of West Newburgh station was to serve West Newburgh Yard.

== Remnants ==
=== CSX Vails Gate Spur ===
The line from Newburgh to Vails Gate survives today as the CSX Vails Gate Spur, a short industrial track branching off the much longer River Subdivision.

==== West Newburgh Yard ====
West Newburgh station had an engine house, turntable, and six-track yard, all of which lasted until at least 1957. As of August 2018, there were derelict tracks crossing Route 32 here, however these were removed in 2019. However, there is still an active siding here, which is the last remnant of the West Newburgh station and yard.

=== Moodna Creek Bridges ===
The line had five crossings of Moodna Creek, all between Salisbury Mills and Blooming Grove stations, of which all five remain. They are all built in the same truss bridge style. Bridge #1 is located in the hamlet of Salisbury Mills, just past the former station site. Bridges #2, #4, and #5 are in the woods between Salisbury Mills and Blooming Grove, whereas Bridge #3 has been converted into a pedestrian bridge

== 1908 wreck ==
Remnants of the 1908 wreck at Greycourt

In 1908, a train running down the branch derailed at the Greycourt Water Tower, just before the yard. L&HR engines #24 and #69 were involved, both were repaired and put back into service, but were later scrapped.
