= Campbell Hall station =

Metro-North Railroad station in New York

Campbell Hall
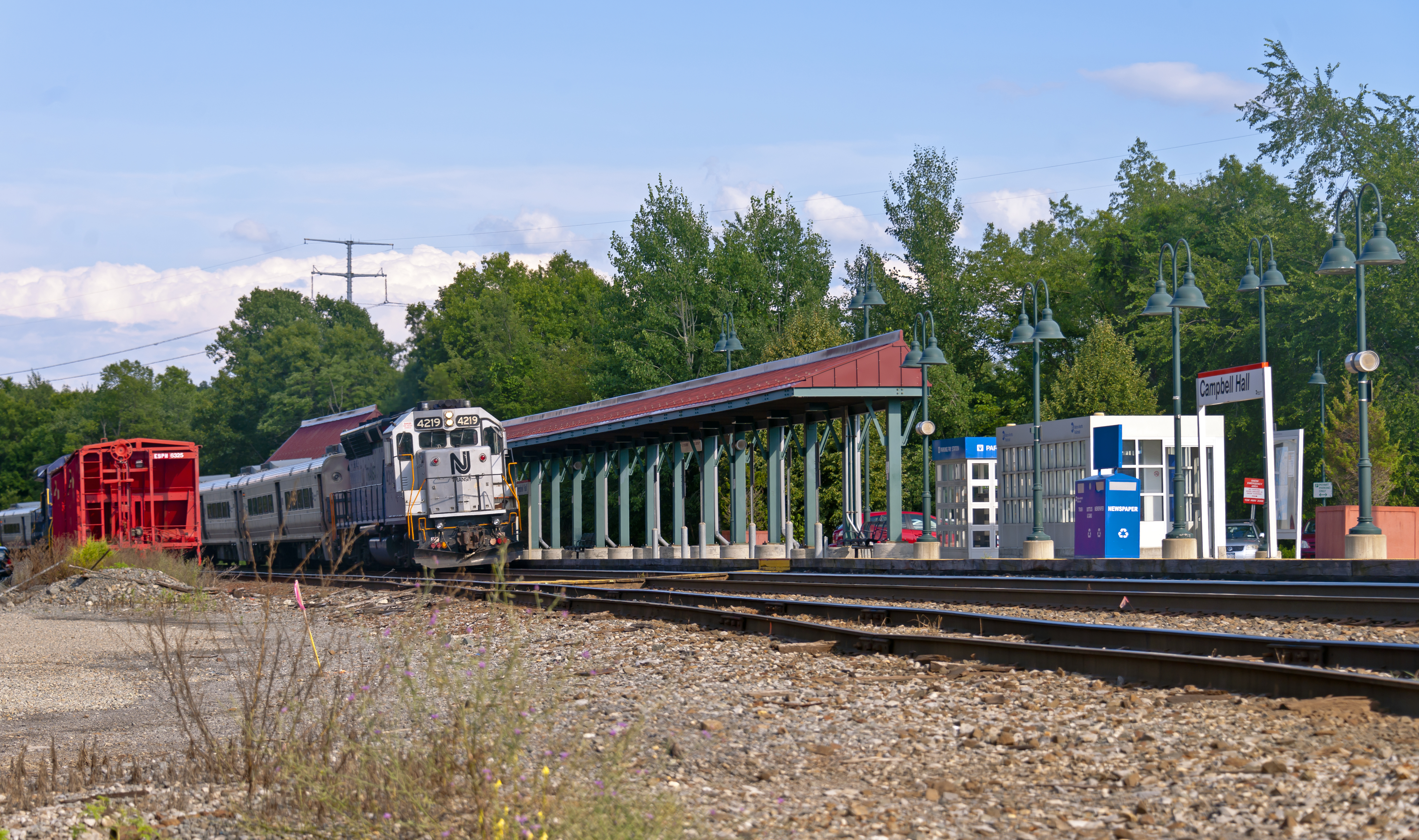
- Westbound train arriving at Campbell Hall station in 2014

General information
- Location: Watkins Drive north of Egbertson Road (CR 77); Hamptonburgh, New York
- Coordinates: 41°27′03″N 74°15′59″W
- Owner: Metro-North Railroad
- Line: NS Southern Tier Line
- Platforms: 1 side platform
- Tracks: 2

Construction
- Structure type: At-grade
- Parking: 231 spaces
- Accessible: Yes

Other information
- Station code: 2577 (MQ Junction; Erie Railroad)

History
- Opened: April 18, 1983

Services
Preceding station	Metro-North Railroad	Following station
Middletown–Town of Wallkill toward Port Jervis	Port Jervis Line	Salisbury Mills–Cornwall toward Hoboken
Location

Campbell Hall station is an active commuter railroad station in the town of Hamptonburgh, Orange County, New York. Located south of the eponymous hamlet of Campbell Hall at the end of Watkins Drive, a driveway off Egbertson Road (County Route 77), the station services trains of Metro-North Railroad's Port Jervis Line. The line, operated by NJ Transit under contract, runs between Port Jervis station in Port Jervis, New York and Hoboken Terminal in Hoboken, New Jersey. The station serves as a park and ride, with a 231-space parking lot. Campbell Hall station contains two tracks, one of which is used by trains and the other of which is a siding, and a single low-level side platform with canopy on the south side of the tracks. A mini-high level platform is present at the east end of the platform to facilitate handicap accessibility.

Campbell Hall station sits at the location of MQ Junction, the former spot where the Erie Railroad Graham Line (a freight only bypass route) and its Montgomery Branch crossed. The Montgomery Branch served passengers at Goshen and Kipps going south from MQ Junction. MQ Junction had a two-story frame interlocking tower, built in 1908 at the cost of $2,043 (1908 USD). The building had at its peak 33 interlocking levers to serve the Graham Line, the Montgomery Branch and access to the New York, Ontario and Western Railway bridge west of the junction. The original station in Campbell Hall was located on the Montgomery Branch at the crossing with State Route 207. This station and the Montgomery Branch had passenger service until June 15, 1935. The current station opened on April 18, 1983 when service on the Port Jervis Line was moved to the Graham Line from the former Erie Railroad main line.

== Station layout ==
The station has two tracks and a low-level side platform with a pathway connecting the platform to the bypass track. The station is where the Erie's Montgomery Branch once intersected the Graham Line and where the former Wallkill Valley Railroad connects to the mainline via an active wye. The Middletown and New Jersey Railroad still runs freight operations up to customers in Maybrook, Montgomery, and the end of the tracks in Walden with its recent takeover of local freight operations from Norfolk Southern. A small yard for the freight carrier, with unused stock stored along several sidings, is located at and just west of the station.

== Bibliography ==
- Yanosey, Robert (2006). Erie Railroad Facilities (In Color): New York. Vol. 2. Scotch Plains, New Jersey: Morning Sun Books Inc. ISBN 1582481962.
