= Harriman station =

Metro-North Railroad station in New York

Harriman
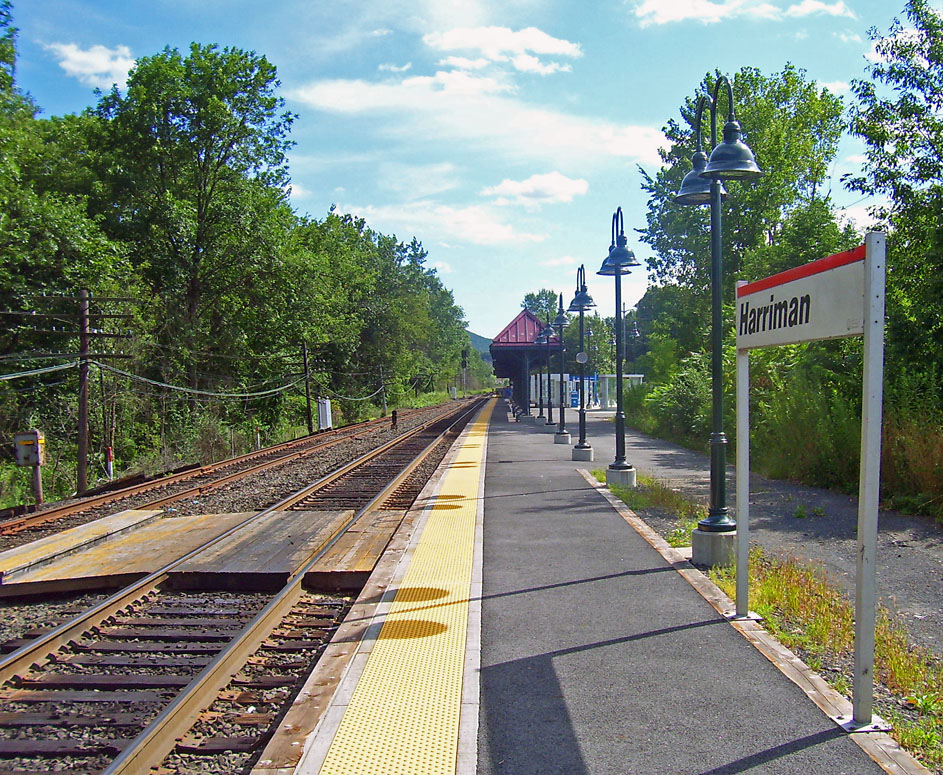
- Harriman station platform

General information
- Location: New York State Route 17; Harriman, New York
- Coordinates: 41°17′41″N 74°08′25″W
- Owner: Metro-North Railroad
- Line: NS Southern Tier Line
- Platforms: 1 side platform
- Tracks: 2
- Connections: Short Line Bus: Main Line Trolley, 17M/MD

Construction
- Structure type: At-grade
- Parking: 985 spaces
- Accessible: Yes

History
- Opened: April 18, 1983

Services
Preceding station	Metro-North Railroad	Following station
Salisbury Mills–Cornwall toward Port Jervis	Port Jervis Line	Tuxedo toward Hoboken
Location

Harriman station is an active commuter railroad station in the town of Woodbury, Orange County, New York. Located on State Route 17 south of the eponymous hamlet of Harriman, the station serves trains of Metro-North Railroad's Port Jervis Line, which operates between Port Jervis station in Port Jervis, New York and Hoboken Terminal in Hoboken, New Jersey. This service is operated by NJ Transit under contract. Harriman station is the largest station north of Suffern, with a 985-space parking lot and a facility for the Metropolitan Transportation Authority Police Department due to its proximity to the Woodbury Common Premium Outlets, the New York State Thruway and Harriman State Park. Harriman station has a single low-level side platform with a mini-high platform to facilitate handicap accessibility. There are two tracks at Harriman station, the main track and a siding and a small wooden platform extension facilitates access to the siding track. Harriman station also marks the terminus of the Sapphire Trail of Sterling Forest State Park.

Harriman station sits at the southern end of a wye formerly operated by the Erie Railroad known as Newburgh Junction. Newburgh Junction served as the point where the Erie Railroad main line went west and the Newburgh Shortcut forked off towards Newburgh, New York. A former station directly in the middle of Harriman hamlet serviced the area until April 15, 1983. On April 18, 1983, service moved to the former Newburgh Shortcut and Graham Line, eliminating service on the main line.

== Station layout ==
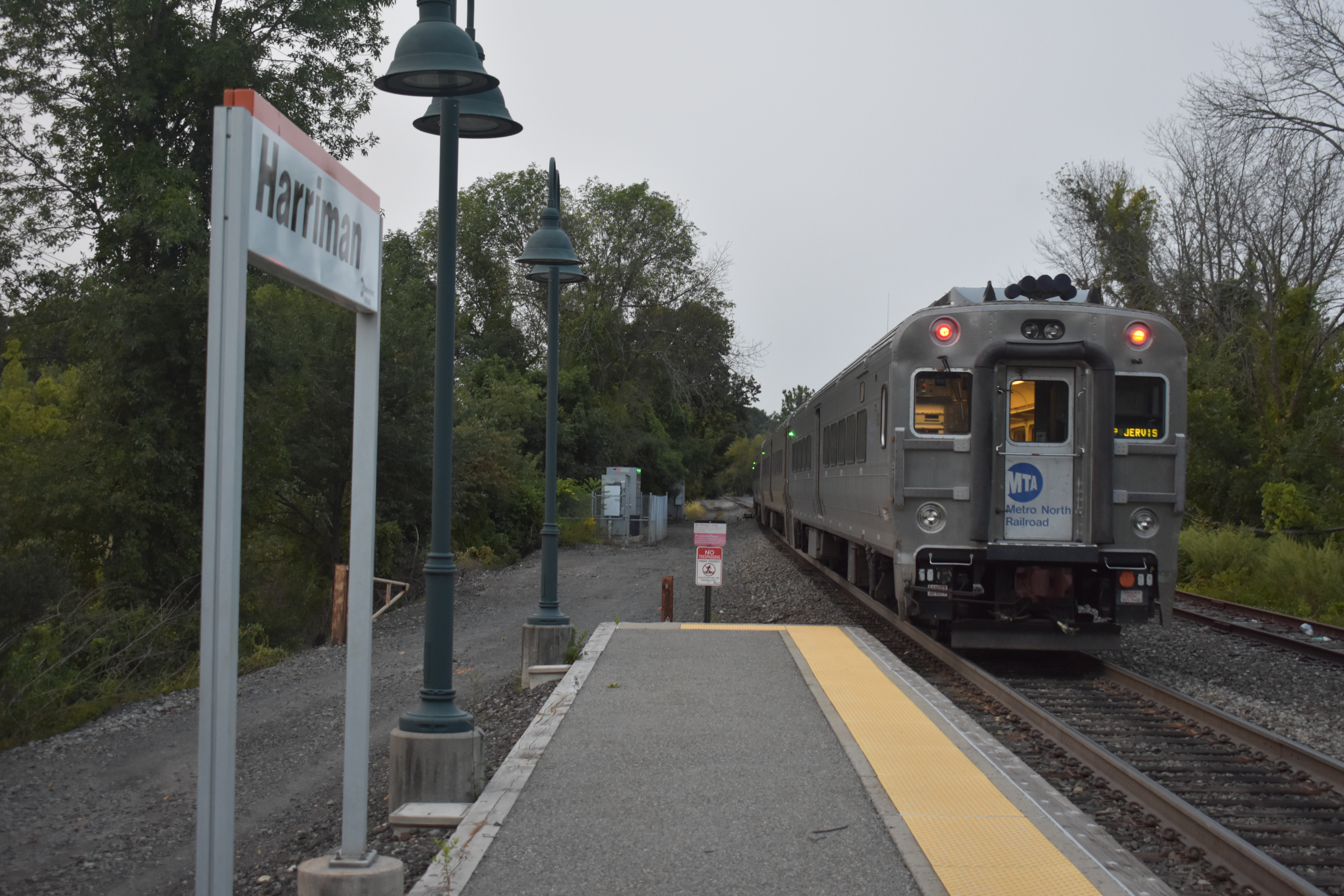
A Port Jervis bound train made up of Metro-North marked Comet V coaches leaves Harriman station.

The station has two tracks and a low-level side platform with a pathway connecting the platform to the siding, however the siding does not connect to the bypassing track where there is a switch near the Newburgh Junction, which is located a few feet north of the station. The station has a very large parking lot (986 spaces) due to its proximity to the New York State Thruway, Route 17, and the Woodbury Commons outlet mall. There is a weekend-only shuttle bus between the station and the mall.
