= Otisville Tunnel =

Railroad tunnel in Orange County, New York

Coordinates: 41°28′33″N 74°32′44″W

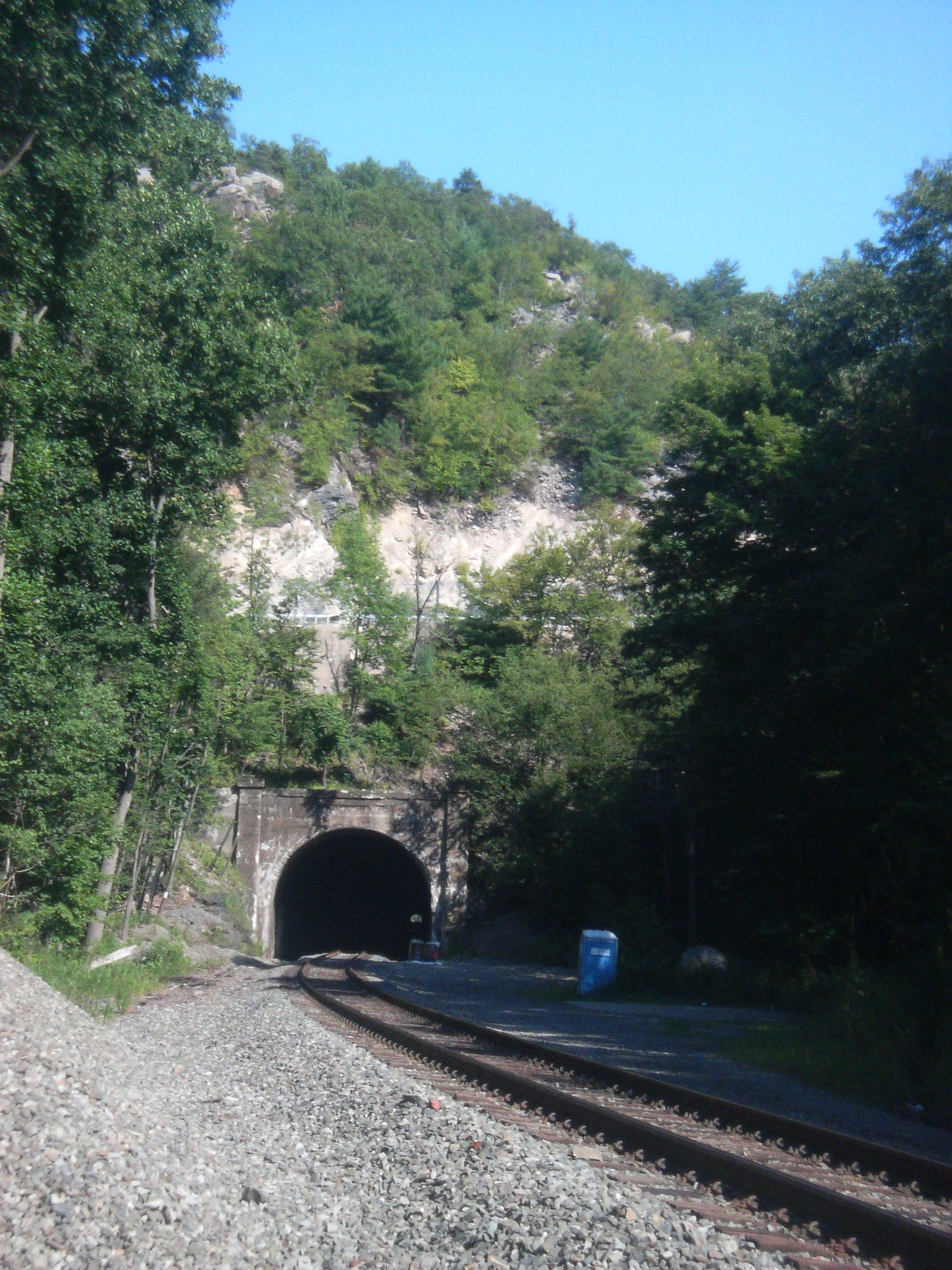
Western portal of the Otisville Tunnel

The Otisville Tunnel is a railroad tunnel that carries Metro-North Railroad's Port Jervis Line beneath the Shawangunk Ridge. It is the longest tunnel in the Metro-North system, at 5,314 feet (1,620 m) in length. Although the track curves at the western opening, the tunnel itself is a straight line, allowing an observer to see all the way through.

It has been leased by Metro-North from the Norfolk Southern Railway since 2003.

== History ==
The tunnel was built in 1908 by the Erie Railroad at the highest point of the Graham Line. The original Erie mainline went over the hill and connected at both ends with the tunnel. Later the "over the hill" tracks were abandoned and all trains ran through the tunnel.

It later operated under the auspices of the merged Erie Lackawanna Railway from 1960 to 1976, and then Conrail from 1976 until it was acquired by Norfolk Southern as part of the breakup of Conrail.

Metro-North took over passenger service in 1983. Today, the tunnel serves trains between Otisville and Port Jervis on Metro-North Railroad's Port Jervis Line.

== Location ==
It passes underneath the Shawangunk Ridge at Otisville, New York, just past Otisville station on the Metro-North Port Jervis Line.

== See also ==
- List of tunnels documented by the Historic American Engineering Record in New York
