= List of tunnels documented by the Historic American Engineering Record in New York =

This is a list of tunnels documented by the Historic American Engineering Record in the U.S. state of New York.

== Tunnels ==
Survey No.	Name (as assigned by HAER)	Built	Documented	Carries	Crosses	Location	County	Coordinates
NY-21	Erie Railway, Otisville Tunnel	1908	1971	Metro-North Railroad		Otisville	Orange	41°28′33″N 74°32′44″W
NY-46	Erie Railway, Dayton Tunnel		1971	New York and Lake Erie Railroad	Former Erie Railroad	Dayton	Cattaraugus	42°25′16″N 78°58′32″W
NY-161	Holland Tunnel	1927	1987	I-78 / Route 139 (NJ side)	Hudson River	Manhattan, New York, and Jersey City, New Jersey	New York County, New York, and Hudson County, New Jersey	40°43′39″N 74°01′17″W
NY-307	Lincoln Tunnel	1937	1991	NY 495 and Route 495	Hudson River	Manhattan, New York, and Jersey City, New Jersey	New York County, New York, and Hudson County, New Jersey	40°45′45″N 74°00′40″W

== See also ==
- List of bridges documented by the Historic American Engineering Record in New York
