= Woodbury Common Premium Outlets =

Coordinates: 41.3147°N 74.1246°W

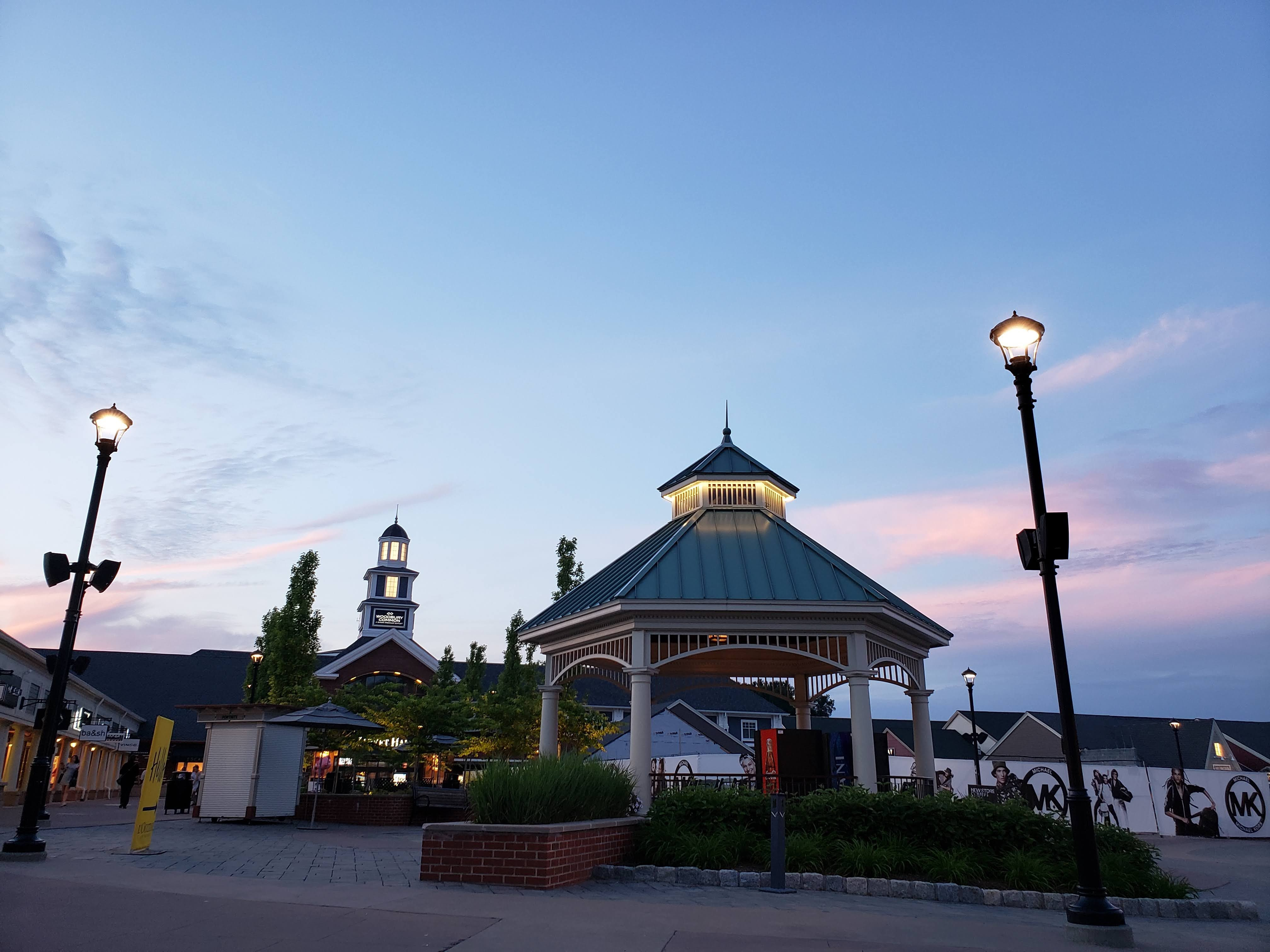
- The Hudson Valley district of Woodbury Common Premium Outlets (2019)
- Location: Central Valley, New York, United States
- Opened: 1985; 41 years ago
- Developer: Chelsea Property Group
- Manager: Simon Premium Outlets
- Owner: Simon Property Group
- Num. of stores: 220
- Floor area: 845,000 ft^{2} (72,000 m^{2})
- Website: Official website

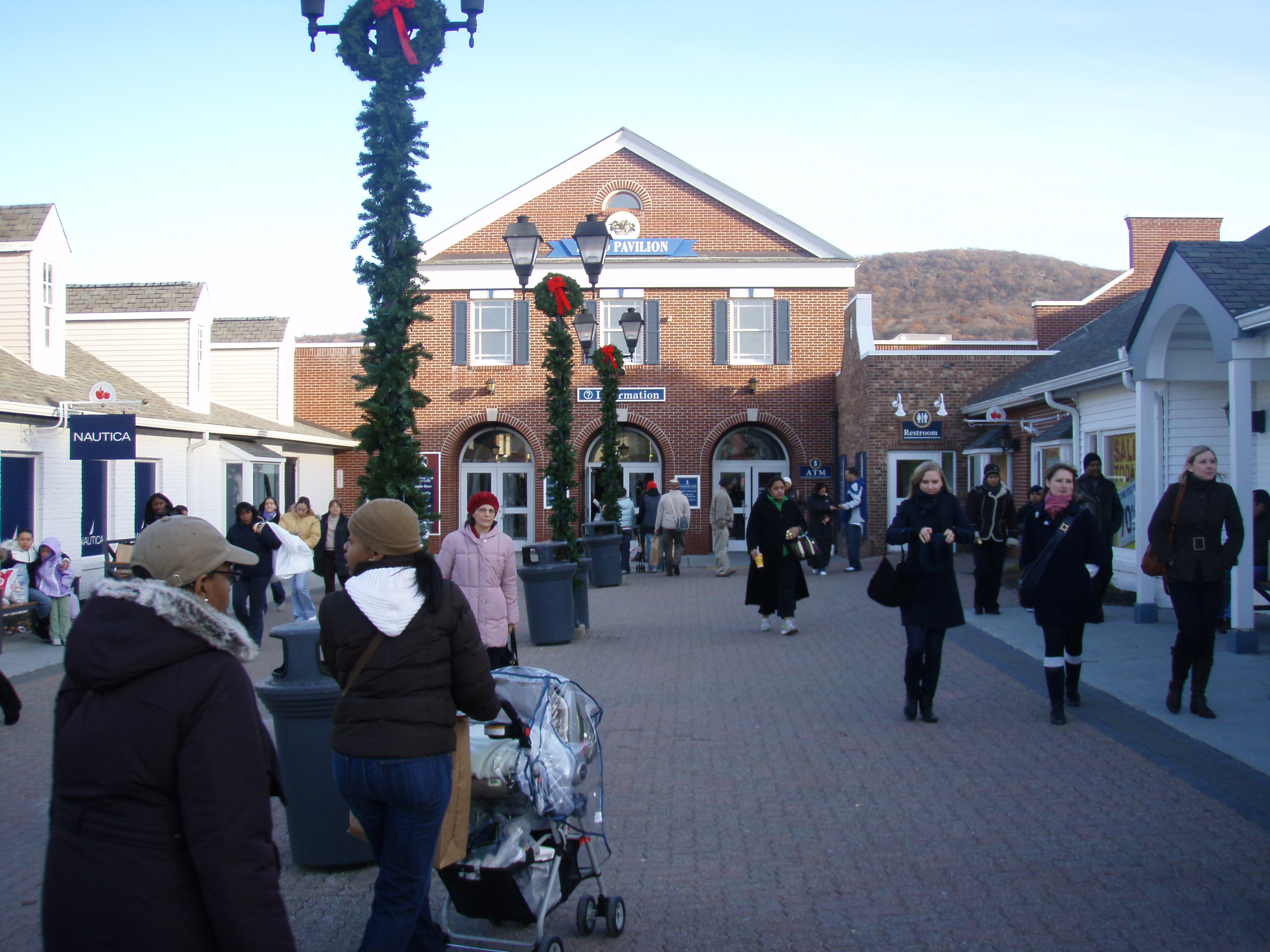
Near the food pavilion

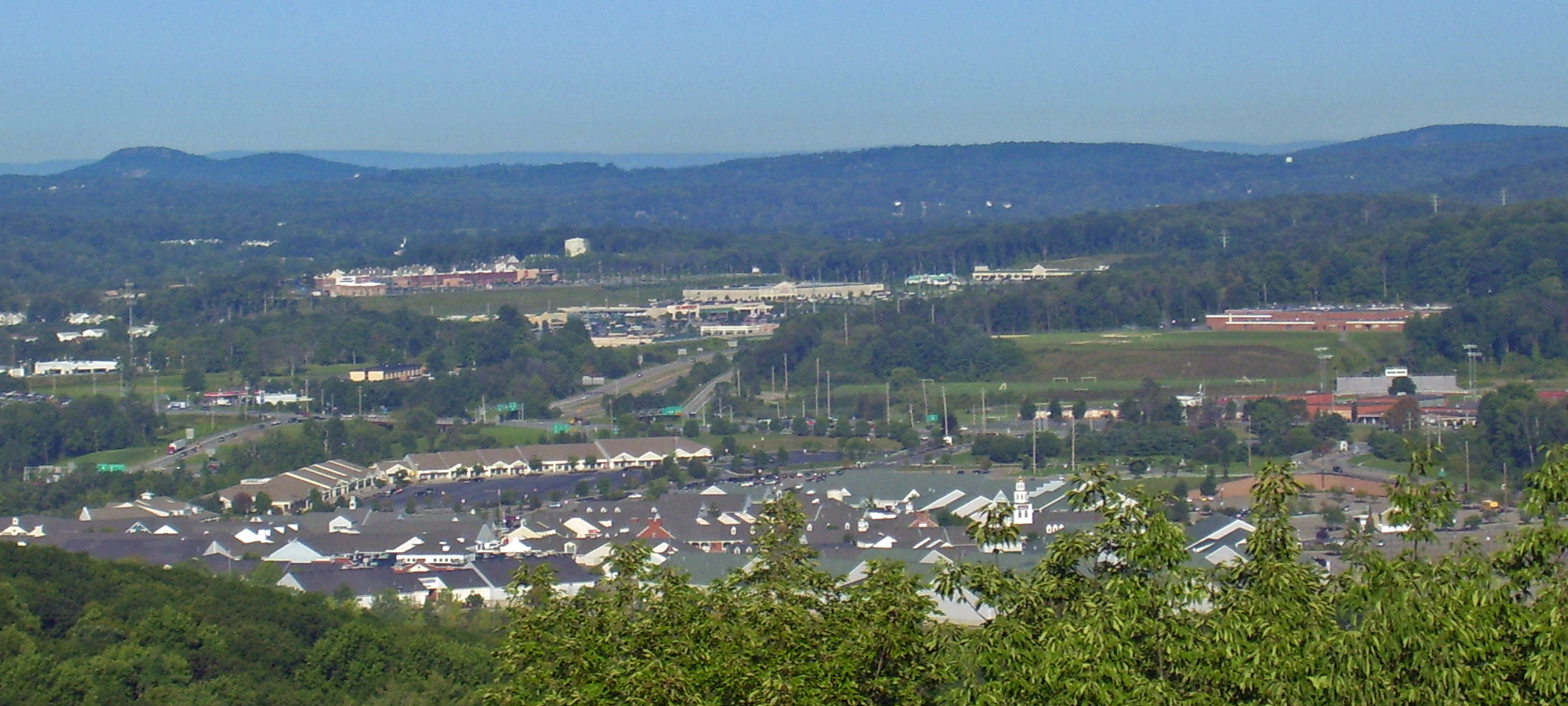
View of outlets from overlook on US 6 to the east.

Woodbury Common Premium Outlets is an outlet center located in the Central Valley section of Woodbury, New York. The center is owned by Premium Outlets, a division of Simon Property Group, and takes its name from the town in which it is located. Opened in late 1985, expanded in 1993, and again in 1998, the center now has 220 stores occupying more than 800,000 square feet (74,000 square meters) and is one of the largest contiguous outlet centers in the world. Due to its size, different areas are color-coded to help orient themselves.

Due to its proximity to New York City, Woodbury Common is a major attraction for foreign tourists visiting the region. Japanese tourists have been overtaken by Chinese tourists as the most frequent foreign visitors.

Tour buses and shuttles make daily trips from New York City, the center employs a staff of interpreters, and currency exchange and foreign shipping services are available on site. Guests are greeted in several languages other than English including Japanese, Spanish, French and Portuguese.

== Local economic impact ==
Orange County officials sometimes refer to Woodbury Common as the county's cash cow as the sales tax collected on the clothing and footwear sold at the center, even after recent reductions by the state, provides a significant portion of the county's revenue. The center is also a significant part of the local property tax base, particularly for the Monroe-Woodbury Central School District.

== Location ==
The center is located on Route 32 just north of Route 17 and due west of Exit 16 on the New York State Thruway (Interstate 87). A weekend-only shuttle bus also runs from the mall to the nearby Harriman station on Metro North's Port Jervis Line. Short Line, part of Coach USA also provides service to this outlet.

== Traffic ==
The downside of the revenue is the traffic generated by the mall, particularly on major shopping days. Black Friday 2001 in particular was remembered for protracted snarling of not just the expressways leading to Woodbury Common but the local roads as well. Some motorists were trapped on the mall's internal roads for hours. Woodbury town officials and residents were upset and pressed state police and Premium Outlets' parent company, Simon, for a solution for future years as they said the company had been unresponsive to such concerns in the past. The following Memorial Day, state troopers, Woodbury police and mall officials tested a new plan whereby they viewed the situation from a command center and made decisions jointly.

However, the Sunday of Labor Day weekend in 2006 also led to some legendary snarling, since bad weather abated just in time for back-to-school sales and roads backed up: U.S. Route 6 was bumper-to-bumper all the way to Palisades Interstate Parkway and the Thruway was backed up 15 miles (24 km) north to Newburgh. Officials called on the state to build a Route 32 exit ramp that lets southbound drivers reach the Thruway without turning left and blocking traffic. It was reported afterwards that New York's Department of Transportation had accelerated the process of designing such a connection.

On Black Friday 2007, Woodbury Common held its second annual Midnight Madness attracting more shoppers than the roads could handle. Traffic at one time was held up for 15 miles (24 km) on the New York State Thruway.

== Expansion plans ==
In 2011 the mall announced a proposed $100 million expansion plan that would include a three-level parking garage, 60,000 square feet (5,600 m^{2}) of additional retail space, new store facades and improvements to traffic flow within the mall, its first major expansion since 1997. It estimates that the project would create 400 construction jobs and 350–400 permanent ones at the new stores. Work would be coordinated with improvements to the Thruway interchange scheduled to begin at that time, and take three years to complete. The state-of-the-art parking deck opened in August 2015. The deck is configured with a system of red and green lights, essentially pointing drivers to available spaces within the deck, or, alternately, directing them to other levels.

== See also ==
- Kiryas Joel murder conspiracy – a plot connected to Woodbury Commons
