= Graham Line =

Portion of the former Erie Railroad in New York State

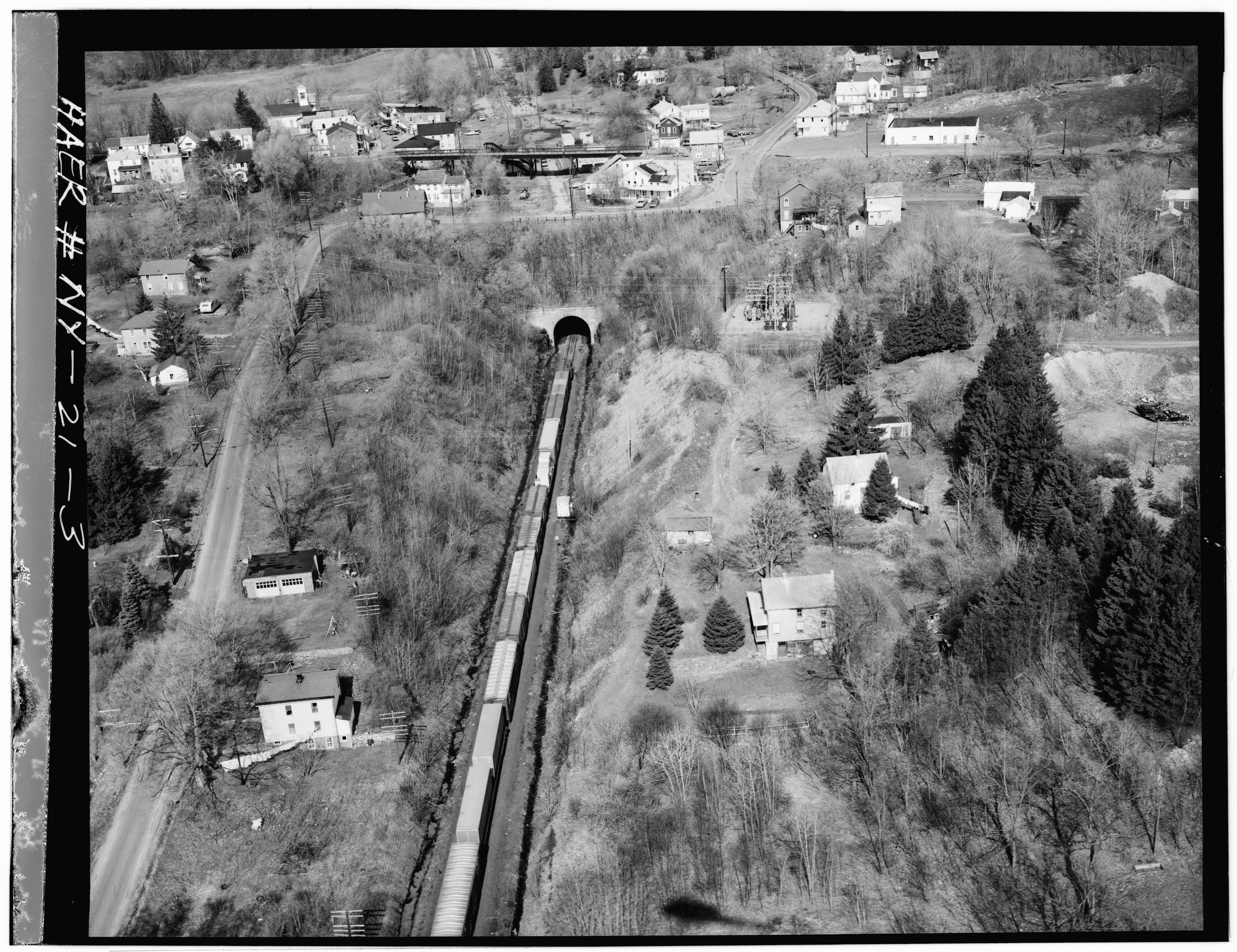
- The Otisville Tunnel carries the Graham Line under Otisville

Overview
- Status: Operational
- Owner: Norfolk Southern Railway
- Locale: Orange County
- Termini: Otisville; Harriman
- Stations: 4

Service
- System: Norfolk Southern Railway; Metro-North Railroad
- Services: Port Jervis Line
- Operator(s): Metro-North Railroad

History
- Commenced: 1904
- Opened: January 1909

Technical
- Track gauge: 4 ft 8 1/2 in (1,435 mm) standard gauge

The Graham Line (also known as the Guymard Cutoff) is the portion of the former Erie Railroad in New York State from Highland Mills (at about 41.343°N 74.120°W) to Guymard (at about 41.429°N 74.595°W), constructed from 1906 to 1909 as a high-speed freight line. The Graham Line bypasses the original Erie Main Line through Monroe, Chester, Goshen and Middletown.

== Description ==
Grade on the Graham Line was not to exceed 0.2 percent eastward or 0.6 percent westward, while the original Main Line built in the 1840s had grades up to 1.25 percent. There were three places where freight trains needed a helper on the old line and none on the new, but just west of the cutoff the grade up from Port Jervis to Guymard could not be improved, and remained unchanged as the only place in the area needing a helper. The sharpest curve on the old line was 7 degrees and on the new was 1 degree 30 minutes. The Graham Line has no grade crossings, which was a rarity on the Erie. The downside of the improved grade and curvature is that the Graham Line is seven miles longer than the original mainline. Maintaining the desired grade required two notable engineering features: the Moodna Viaduct and the Otisville Tunnel.

== History ==
Map of the Graham Line

The line was originally called the Guymard Cutoff. The Erie's chief engineer, James Graham, died in February 1909, a month after the line was fully opened to traffic. By 1911, the Guymard station was renamed Graham and the cutoff became the Graham Line. In both cases, the cutoff was named for the little-known station at its west end, where it joins the original Main Line on the grade down to Port Jervis. In a lawsuit of this same period, the owners of the Guymard Lead and Zinc Mine, inactive since 1876, sued the Erie for building a "spur" line that blocked their access, which may have influenced the Erie to change the name.

The short section from Newburgh Junction (on the Main Line at Harriman) to Highland Mills was part of the Erie's original Newburgh Branch, opened in 1869, but it was considered part of the Graham Line after that branch closed to passenger service in 1935. The old Main Line was abandoned in 1954 west of Howells, where the two lines came side by side, and after that date the Graham Line was considered to end at Howells Junction.

=== Passenger rail service ===
Effective April 18, 1983, Metro-North Railroad shifted its Port Jervis Line service to run on the Graham Line, marking the first time it had hosted scheduled passenger service. The line also got its first passenger stations, at Salisbury Mills-Cornwall, Campbell Hall, and Middletown (which is not actually in Middletown but nearby). Following the Metro-North change and discontinuance of its own local freight service, Conrail, owner of the railroad, was able to abandon the original Main Line the following year. Using the Graham Line avoided the many grade crossings in the old town centers, improving safety and train speed. But the Graham Line, designed entirely for freight trains, has the disadvantage for passenger services of running through much less-populated areas. Commuters arrive at the Graham Line stations almost entirely by automobile.
