= Port Jervis Line =

Commuter rail line in New York

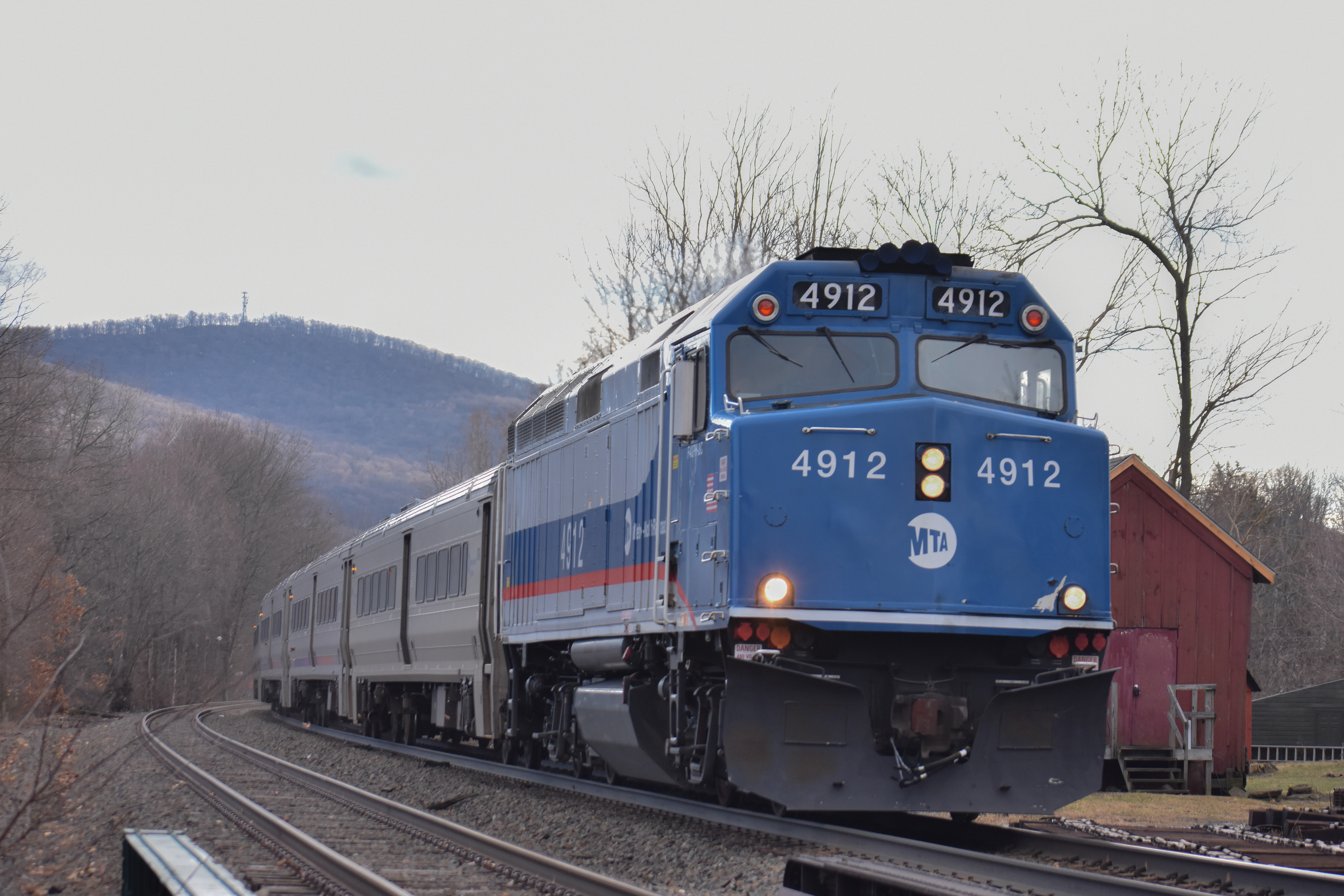
- Port Jervis train No. 75 in Woodbury, New York, heading towards Salisbury Mills–Cornwall station

Overview
- Owner: Norfolk Southern Railway (leased to Metro-North Railroad)
- Locale: Northern New Jersey and Hudson Valley, New York, United States
- Termini: Hoboken Terminal; Port Jervis
- Stations: 12 (express service); 24 (local via Bergen County Line); 26 (local via Main Line)

Service
- Type: Commuter rail
- System: New Jersey Transit Rail Operations; Metro-North Railroad
- Operator(s): NJ Transit Rail Operations (under contract to Metro-North Railroad)
- Rolling stock: F40PH-3C/GP40PH-2/GP40FH-2/PL42AC/ALP-45DP locomotives Comet V
- Daily ridership: 2,613 (2018)
- Ridership: 581,453 (annual ridership, 2024)

Technical
- Line length: 95.0 mi (152.9 km)
- Track gauge: 4 ft 8 1/2 in (1,435 mm) standard gauge

The Port Jervis Line is a predominantly single-track commuter rail line running between Suffern and Port Jervis, in the U.S. state of New York. At Suffern, the line continues south into New Jersey on NJ Transit's Main Line. The line is operated by NJ Transit Rail Operations under a contract with Metro-North Railroad (MNR).

During weekday rush hours trains operate in express service, making stops only at New York state stations and at major stations in New Jersey where transfers can be made to services into New York City.

The line runs through some of the most remote and rural country found on the Metro-North system, and includes both its longest bridge, the Moodna Viaduct, and longest tunnel, the Otisville Tunnel. The western terminus, Port Jervis station, is located two blocks from the Delaware River, which marks the border between New York and Pennsylvania.

Norfolk Southern Railway (NS) shares the use of the track for local freight operations between Suffern and Port Jervis. The New York, Susquehanna and Western Railway operates over the line between Hudson Junction (east of Campbell Hall) and Port Jervis, and onward to Binghamton over the former Erie Railroad Delaware Division (now the Central New York Railroad). The tracks have been owned by NS since the 1999 split of Conrail, but were built by the Erie and incorporated into Conrail on its formation on April 1, 1976. Metro-North leased the entire line from NS in 2003, with the possibility of outright purchase after 2006. Since 2003, MNRR immediately began a substantial track and signal improvement program in order to provide a more reliable and comfortable service, for $183 million.

== History ==
=== Erie Railroad use ===
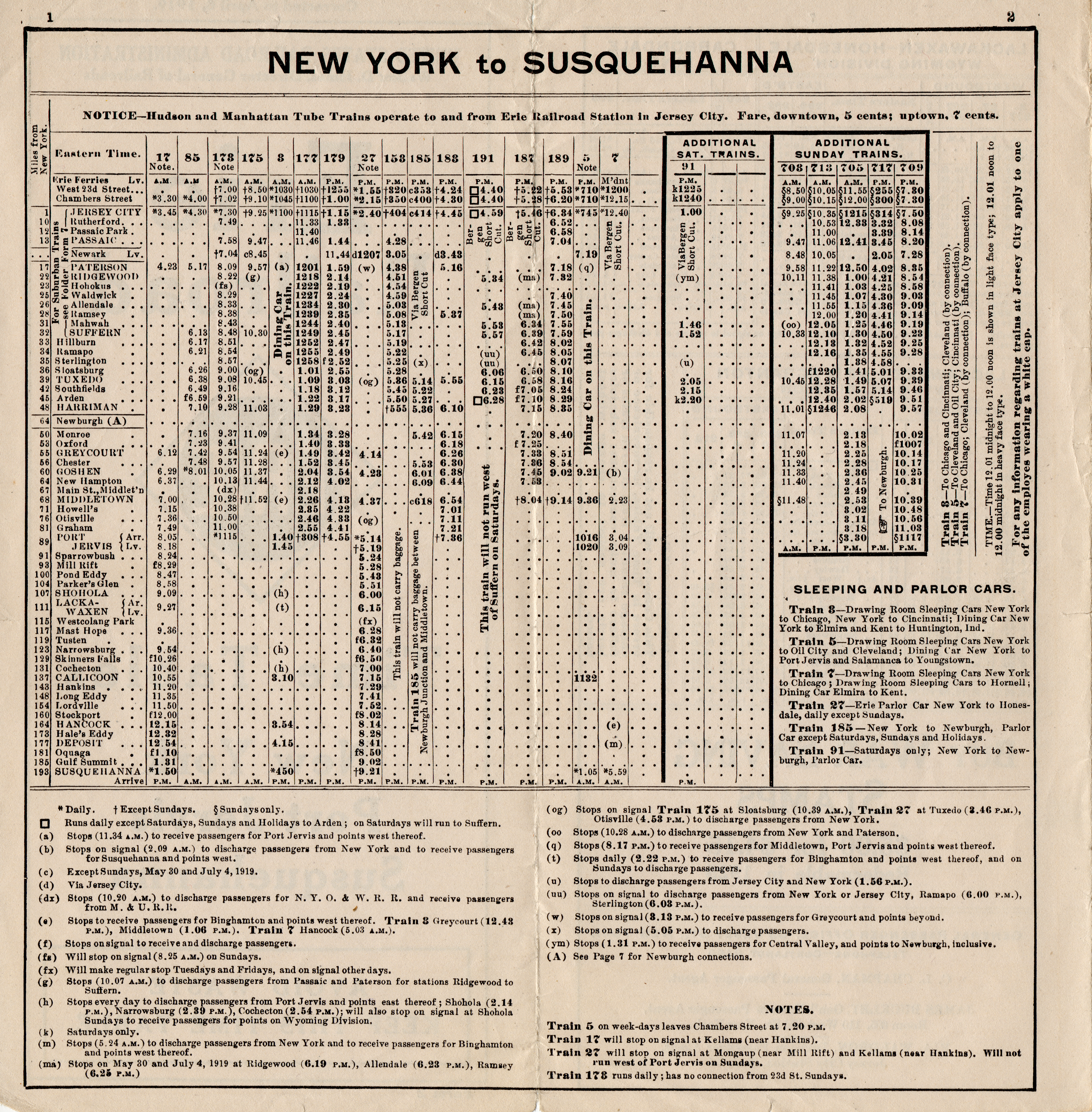
Westbound Passenger Timetable of the Erie Railroad Main Line (New York to Susquehanna) under United States Railway Administration Effective 1919-04-06

The portions of the line from Suffern to Harriman and from Otisville to Port Jervis were built as the mainline of the New York and Erie Rail Road, opening to Port Jervis in 1848. The route south of Suffern is slightly younger (connected for through service in 1853); the original mainline ran east from Suffern to Piermont. The portion from Harriman to Otisville was built in 1906–1909 as a low-level freight bypass named the Graham Line. This portion of the line bypasses the original Erie mainline through Monroe, Chester, Goshen and Middletown.

The line, along with the Main Line through Paterson, served as a segment of the Erie Railroad's long-distance flagship trains to points west such as Binghamton, New York State's Southern Tier, Buffalo and Chicago, on daily routes such as the day train, the Erie Limited. Additional through trains to Chicago were the Pacific Express, and its east-bound counterpart, the Atlantic Express. The Lake Cities and the Atlantic Express/Pacific Express were night-time departures. The Erie Limited was discontinued in 1963. Other routes west were eliminated throughout the course of the 1960s. The last train west of Port Jervis, #21/#22, a daily train to Binghamton, had its final run on November 27, 1966.

=== MTA/NJ Transit use ===
On November 14, 1973, the Metropolitan Transportation Authority agreed to subsidize existing Erie Lackawanna Railway service on the Port Jervis Line between Suffern and Port Jervis, which became part of Conrail on April 1, 1976. The MTA subsidy began on September 16, 1974. New Jersey Transit subsidized the service within New Jersey. The MTA was only responsible for paying for Conrail's operation and maintenance of the line and stations. A federal statute, the Northeast Rail Services Act of 1981, was passed, relieving Conrail of its obligation to operate commuter rail service for local and state transportation agencies after December 31, 1982. To ensure that service was not terminated, the MTA created a wholly owned subsidiary, the Metro-North Commuter Railroad.

Weekday service was added on the branch on August 17, 1982, in the form of shuttle service to and from Suffern. Four new northbound trips would operate to Middletown, leaving Suffern at 7:08 a.m., 10:35 a.m., 4:55 p.m., and 9:05 p.m., while three new southbound trips to Suffern would operate from Middletown, leaving at 5:23 a.m., 8:57 a.m., and 2:57 p.m., and one new southbound trip would leave from Tuxedo at 7:05 p.m.

On January 1, 1983, Metro-North took over the commuter operations of Conrail in the state of New York, and New Jersey Transit Rail Operations took over the commuter operations of Conrail in New Jersey. This included service west of the Hudson River, where rail lines do not connect directly with New York City. These lines pass through New Jersey, stopping at Secaucus Junction, where New Jersey Transit trains provide service to New York Penn Station multiple times per hour, and terminating at Hoboken Terminal.

In 1983, Conrail installed continuous welded rail on the line between Tuxedo and Suffern, and between Middletown and Harriman.

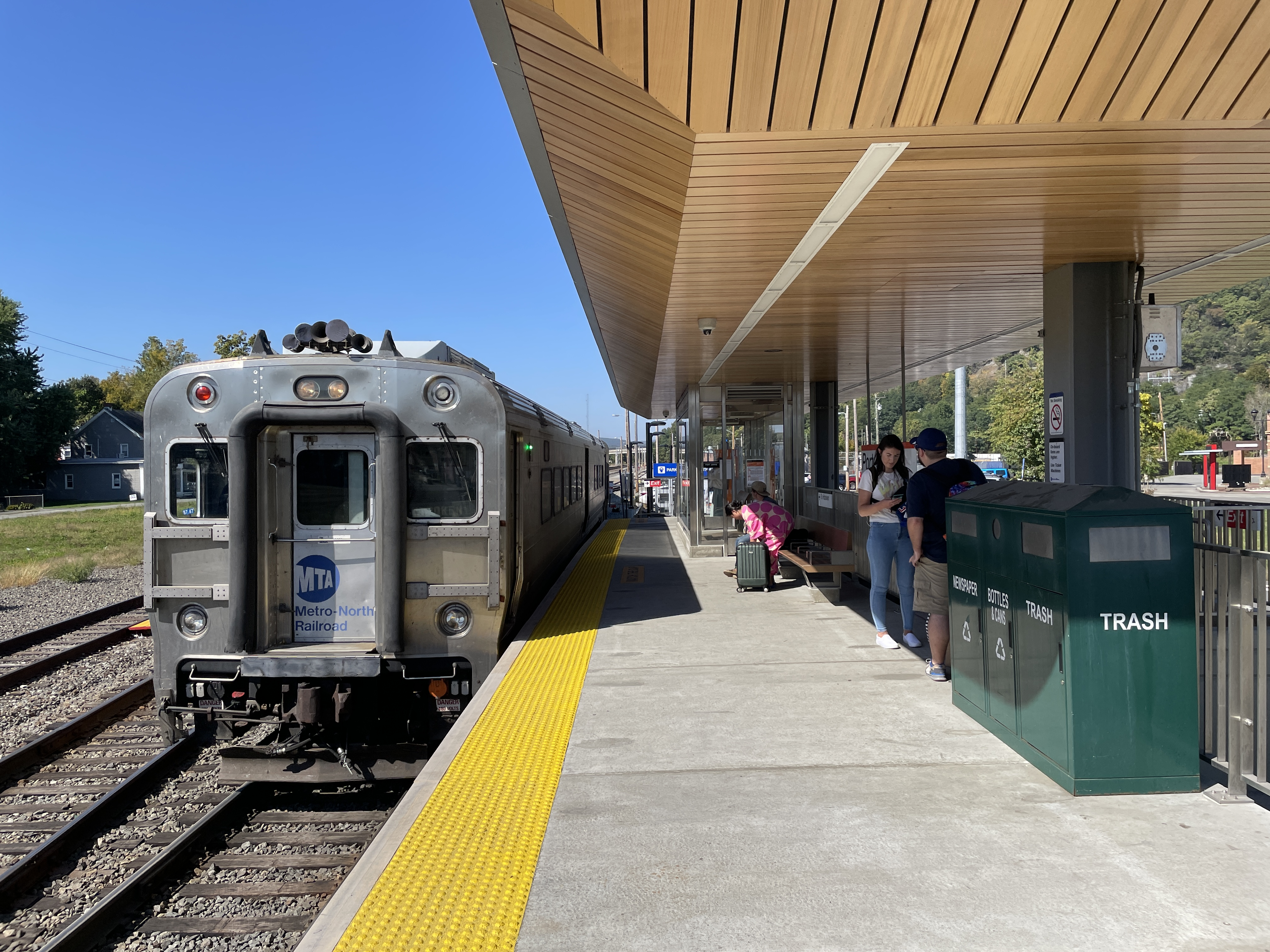
Port Jervis station, which serves as the terminus of the Port Jervis Line

The MTA initially equipped the lines with second-hand equipment. In 1984, the Main Line between Harriman and Middletown was abandoned, and service was moved to the longer (by 6 miles) Graham Line, the Erie's freight cutoff. Officially, the first day of regular service on the Graham Line was April 18, 1983. Since this was the first passenger service on the Graham line, new stations were built, but without facilities in order to minimize costs. At the time this was a very unpopular move with commuters, who were used to having their trains stop right in the center of their towns. However, the MTA cited that it was responding to pressure by the towns to have the service moved out of the populated areas due to "traffic concerns" caused by the closures of the grade crossings. The Graham Line passed through no populated areas, and driving to the new stations was an additional time cost for many commuters. However, others wanted trains out of the center of the towns, and so the switch was made. The old mainline was no longer used for freight, so following the move to the Graham line, it was abandoned. The line from Harriman to Middletown is now the Orange County Heritage Trail.

On October 27, 1991, all but one pair of trains on the line now ran through to or from Hoboken instead of operating as shuttles to or from Suffern. Three Port Jervis-bound PM trains, and four Hoboken-bound AM trains began making limited stops in New Jersey. The shuttle service had been implemented in August 1982 with RDCs.

==== Improvements and MTA lease ====
In the mid-1990s, as Orange County started to become a popular place for commuters, political pressure caused the MTA to start improving service and stations. In the 2000s, growth in Orange County accelerated; stations were upgraded with expanded parking lots, which became paid lots in line with the rest of the Metro-North system.

Metro-North had a handshake agreement with Conrail to purchase the line for $9.8 million in 1997, but it was not completed before the Norfolk Southern Corporation (NS) and the CSX Corporation agreed to acquire Conrail in spring 1997 for $10 billion. Metro-North had estimated it would cost $88.5 million to bring the line into a state of good repair. The acquisition was approved on July 23, 1998, and was implemented in 1999. As part of the transaction, the Port Jervis Line went under the control of NS.

In April 2002, Norfolk Southern told Metro-North that it would not renew the existing trackage agreement between the two parties, which was set to expire on December 31, 2003. The agreement had required Norfolk Southern to maintain the line at a standard to permit Metro-North trains to operate between 60 and 79 miles per hour in exchange for Metro-North's paying the railroad at the going cents-per-mile rate. Metro-North paid Norfolk Southern $583,420 in 2002. Norfolk Southern no longer wanted to spend money maintaining the line to such a standard when it only operated two slow freight trains a day over the line.

On January 22, 2003, the Metro-North Railroad Committee of the MTA Board approved a 49-year lease of the entire line from Norfolk Southern. Metro-North would take over responsibility for maintaining the line. The lease would cost Metro-North $500,000 in 2003, increasing to $1.5 million in 2004, $3 million in 2005, and $3 million subject to an adjustment in the consumer price index every three years. Either side could begin negotiations to sell the line to Metro-North in 2006, when NS would stop leasing the line from a subsidiary of Conrail, and would be in a position to sell. As part of the deal, Norfolk Southern would retain exclusive free trackage rights to operate freight trains over the line, and would be exempted from county and town property taxes. On January 30, the full MTA Board approved the lease. The lease took effect on April 1, 2003.

In January 2003, after plans to lease the line were announced, agency staff began creating an inventory of the rail line to prioritize capital upgrades. In August, it was reported that Metro-North would install continuous welded rail on seven miles of the line, with five miles of it being between Howells and Otisville, with the rest south of Harriman. The project, which was to be completed by the start of winter, was intended to improve signal reliability, reduce maintenance costs, and permit smoother rides. This would be the railroad's first major project to improve the line since its lease took effect.

Also in 2003, Secaucus Junction station opened, reducing travel time to Midtown. Metro-North covered $53 million of the cost of that project, and spent $75 million to upgrade stations on the line and order new train cars in anticipation of the project. The opening of Secaucus was expected to increase ridership by 1,000 people a day, but that did not materialize with changes in commuting patterns after the September 11 attacks.

==== Hurricane Irene ====
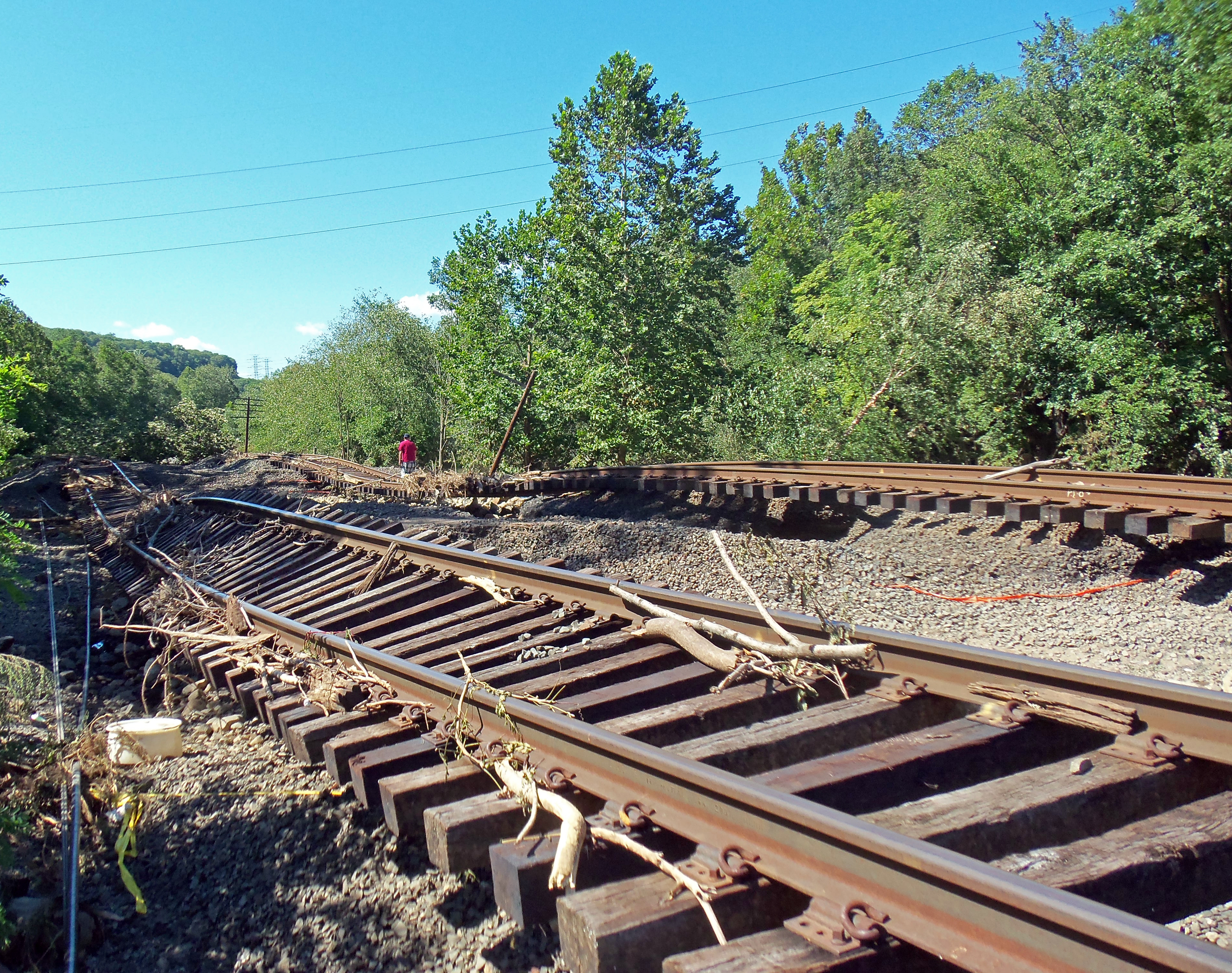
Hurricane Irene damage at Sloatsburg

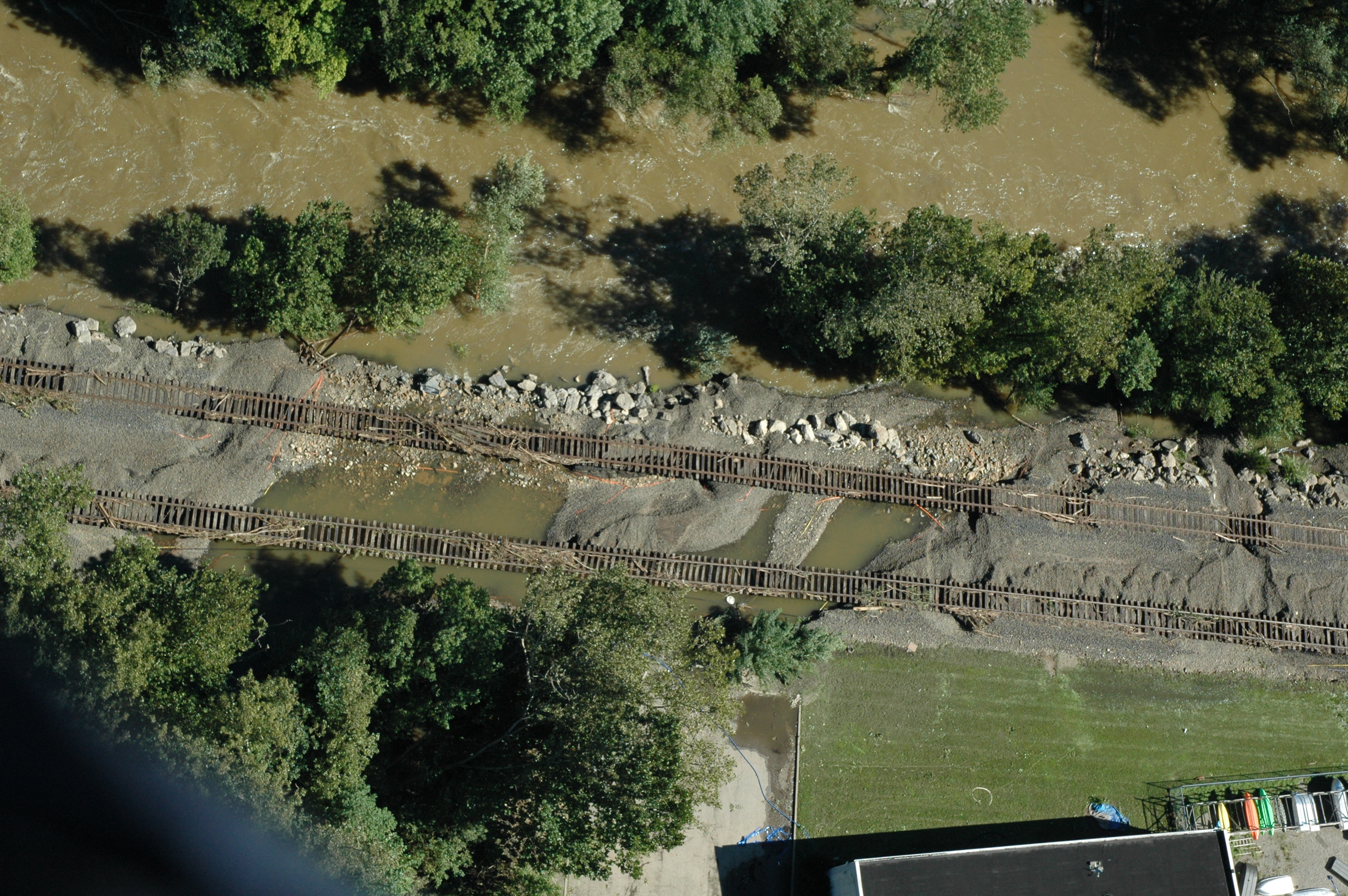
Washout on the tracks south of Harriman after Hurricane Irene

Service north of Suffern was suspended due to severe damage from Hurricane Irene on August 28, 2011. 14 miles of the line were damaged. The roadbed was washed away, signal cables were exposed or went underwater, bridge structures were exposed, the right of way along the Ramapo River eroded, and track was damaged. There were eight washouts on the line near Harriman, and 50 overall. On August 29, Metro-North President Howard Permut said that it would take months to repair the line. Shuttle bus service began being offered to all stations on September 12. An emergency $500,000 contract was granted to AECOM to analyze the conditions of structures and tracks along the 14-mile section with damage.

Shuttle train service between Harriman and Port Jervis started on September 19, and full train service resumed on November 28, 2011, one month earlier than anticipated. While repairs were initially estimated to cost $60 million, that projection was reduced to $30 to $40 million in November 2011.

==== Future expansion and improvements ====
In 2008, Metro-North and the Port Authority of New York and New Jersey (PANYNJ) began a joint feasibility study of a possible branch from the line to Stewart International Airport, which the Port Authority had taken over the year before, ending a seven-year privatization experiment. The PANYNJ withdrew from the study after its first phase, having decided that express bus service could meet the same needs much more cheaply. Metro-North is continuing the study on its own. Future improvements for the line include the completion of the cab-signaling system and the construction of a yard near Salisbury Mills to relieve pressure on the Suffern yard.

In a 2013 report, the MTA revealed that planning was underway for installing a second track between Sloatsburg and the Moodna Viaduct, and for the construction of a midway yard on the line.

In 2013, Metro-North spent $3 million to repair the Otisville Tunnel and $67 million to replace the line's signal system, which dated to the 1940s.

$83 million was allocated in the 2015–2019 MTA Capital Program to keep the Port Jervis Branch in a State of Good Repair. This money will be allocated to repairing the Moodna and Woodbury Viaducts, station improvements, replacing or rehabilitating under-grade bridges, track improvements and capacity improvements. The MTA's 20 Year Needs Report includes the installation of Positive Train Control; the continued rehabilitation and replacement of under-grade bridges and culverts; the replacement of the diesel fleet; and the replacement of the Woodbury and Moodna Viaducts.

In 2017, Metro-North started its West of Hudson Regional Transit Access Study to evaluate possible improvements in the Port Jervis Line service. An open-house presentation took place on February 15, 2017. $150 million in improvements will be made from 2017 to 2023. As part of the study, three possible sites for a midpoint yard were evaluated: Harriman, Salisbury Mills, Campbell Hall. The Campbell Hall site was chosen as it has the least potential to block the line if a train breaks down; because of its lower cost; and because it advances an operating plan to have inner service on the line run from Middletown. In addition, three passing sidings would be added near the Tuxedo, Salisbury Mills and Middletown stations. The sidings and the yard would allow for increased service on the line, from the current 27 trains a day to as many as 44. Trains between Port Jervis and Middletown would be increased by one to 26; trains between Middletown and Campbell Hall would be increased from 27 to 37, and trains between Campbell Hall to Hoboken would be increased to 44. The midpoint yard and passing sidings would be open in 2023.

The passing sidings would all be at least two miles (3.2 km) long, bringing the line closer to the railroad's eventual goal of double-tracking all of it. While they can be built within the railroad's existing right-of-way, the midpoint yard—estimated to be 3,000 by 400 feet (910 by 120 m)—would require the purchase of additional land. When complete it could hold as many as nine additional trains.

In April 2020, work to install cab signaling on the entire line to support Positive Train Control was completed.

== Description ==
Port Jervis Line trains start at Hoboken and then stop at Secaucus Junction to take passengers connecting from New York Penn Station. Most of the Port Jervis Line trains then travel to New York State at Suffern, running non-stop or making one stop at Ramsey Route 17 station. Those can be routed via either the Main Line or Bergen County Line between Secaucus and Ridgewood. On weekends, most Port Jervis trains run local, making all stops on either line.

From Suffern, the line follows the same narrow valley as the New York State Thruway and NY 17. The stations at Sloatsburg and Tuxedo are very close to 17 and, while Harriman also has its entrance on 17, its actual platform is farther back, adjacent to the Thruway. Harriman is the busiest station on the line. One peak hour train in each direction runs nonstop between Secaucus and Harriman. The Tuxedo station is the only stop on the line with the original (1883) passenger station building.

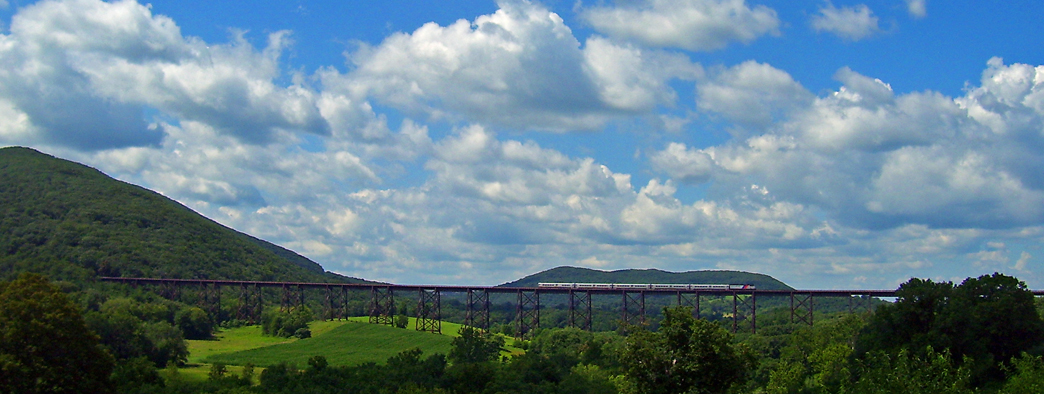
A Port Jervis Line train crossing the Moodna Viaduct

After crossing under the on-ramp from 17 to the Thruway and passing Woodbury Commons, the line gradually moves away from the Thruway, crossing NY 32 and running along the shoulder of Schunemunk Mountain, where it twice is crossed by hiking trails. At Schunemunk's north end, it curves along to the Moodna Viaduct: the highest and longest railroad trestle east of the Mississippi River. Immediately afterward, it crosses NY 94 and arrives at Salisbury Mills-Cornwall in the Town of Cornwall.

The westward curve accelerates afterward and the line begins to run almost east–west across central Orange County. Campbell Hall station services the towns of Goshen, Montgomery and Walden.

The track crosses the Wallkill River, then Interstate 84, to run parallel to NY 211 near Highland Lakes State Park for a while. Shortly after leaving the highway's side, trains arrive at Middletown near the popular Galleria at Crystal Run shopping mall.

Almost unnoticed from the highway, the line crosses under the Route 17 expressway (the future Interstate 86) after leaving Middletown. A second track begins at Howells, to accommodate trains waiting for others to clear the Otisville Tunnel. The siding rejoins the mainline just after the Otisville station, as trains enter a mile-long (1.6 km) tunnel under the Shawangunk Ridge: the longest on Metro-North.

Once on the western end, in some of the most undeveloped countryside Metro-North passes through, trains make a long descent of the west side of Shawangunk Ridge, parallel to the Neversink River valley southwards, reaching valley level just before the terminal station Port Jervis and the yard beyond.

== Stations ==
State	Zone	Location	Station	Mile (km)	Date opened	Date closed	Connections
NJ	1	Hoboken	Hoboken Terminal	0.0 (0.0)	1903		NJ Transit Rail: ■ Bergen County Line, ■ Meadowlands Rail Line, ■ Gladstone Branch, ■ Main Line, ■ Montclair–Boonton Line, ■ Morristown Line, ■ North Jersey Coast Line, ■ Pascack Valley Line, ■ Raritan Valley Line; Hudson–Bergen Light Rail: ■ 8th Street–Hoboken, ■ Hoboken–Tonnelle; PATH: HOB-33 HOB-WTC JSQ-33 (via HOB); NJ Transit Bus; NY Waterway to Battery Park City
NJ	1	Secaucus	Secaucus Junction	3.5 (5.6)	2003		NJ Transit Rail (upper level): ■ Gladstone Branch, ■ Montclair–Boonton Line, ■ Morristown Line, ■ Northeast Corridor Line, ■ North Jersey Coast Line, ■ Raritan Valley Line; NJ Transit Rail (lower level): ■ Bergen County Line, ■ Meadowlands Rail Line, ■ Main Line, ■ Pascack Valley Line; NJ Transit Bus
NJ	13	Ramsey	Ramsey Route 17	27.9 (44.9)	August 22, 2004		NJ Transit Rail: ■ Main Line, ■ Bergen County Line
NJ	14	Mahwah	Mahwah (limited service)	29.1 (46.8)	1871		NJ Transit Rail: ■ Main Line, ■ Bergen County Line; Short Line Bus
NY	14	Suffern	Suffern	30.5 (49.1)	June 30, 1841		NJ Transit Rail: ■ Main Line, ■ Bergen County Line; Transport of Rockland, Hudson Link, Short Line Bus
NY		Hillburn	Hillburn			1950s	
NY		Ramapo	Ramapo			1950s	
NY			Sterlington			1940s	
NY	MNR	Sloatsburg	Sloatsburg	34.5 (55.5)	1868		Transport of Rockland, Short Line Bus
NY	MNR	Tuxedo	Tuxedo	37.0 (59.5)	1885		Short Line Bus
NY	MNR	Tuxedo	Southfields			1970s	
NY	MNR	Tuxedo	Arden			1970s	
NY	MNR	Harriman	Harriman	45.0 (72.4)	April 18, 1983		Short Line Bus, Short Line Trolley
NY	MNR	Cornwall	Salisbury Mills–Cornwall	55.4 (89.1)	April 18, 1983		Routed along Graham Line
NY	MNR	Hamptonburgh	Campbell Hall	65.6 (105.6)	April 18, 1983		Routed along Graham Line
NY	MNR	Wallkill	Middletown–Town of Wallkill	71.9 (115.1)	April 18, 1983		Short Line Bus; Routed along Graham Line
NY	MNR	Wallkill	Howells			1970s	
NY	MNR	Otisville	Otisville	81.6 (131.3)	November 1, 1846		Short Line Bus
NY	MNR	Mount Hope	Graham			1950s	
NY	MNR	Port Jervis	Port Jervis	95.0 (152.9)	1892		Short Line Bus

== Operations ==
Due to the arrangement between the MTA and NJ Transit, although the MTA subsidizes the service and maintains all of the facilities (except for the Suffern station), the actual operation of the line is almost totally under the control of NJ Transit–the trains are operated by NJT personnel; the trains are dispatched from Hoboken and the ticket vending machines on station platforms are NJT machines, not Metro-North's. The fare system is a combination of NJT and Metro-North policies.

== Bibliography ==
- Hungerford, Edward (1946). Men of Erie: A Story of Human Effort. New York, New York: Random House. OCLC 500324.
- Mott, Edward Harold (1899). Between the Ocean and the Lakes: The Story of Erie. New York, New York: John S. Collins.
