= Edward Hungerford (author) =

American journalist and author

Edward Hungerford (1875 – July 29, 1948) was an American journalist and author. His main interest was the railroad, about which he wrote many books and articles. He travelled extensively by rail and was a specialist in organizing railroad exhibitions.

== Early life ==
Hungerford was born in Watertown, New York the son of Charles Anson Hungerford and his wife Cora Sill. His parents operated a grocery store in Watertown until 1892, when they became owners of the Woodruff House, a much larger store, for 13 years. Hungerford was given a job there, running the elevator. He was educated at Watertown High School, and was then sent to Williston Seminary in Easthampton, Massachusetts. He was a poor student and much of his childhood he spent watching trains on the Rome, Watertown and Ogdensburg Railroad. His father wanted him to become an architect and he enrolled in an architecture program at Syracuse University. However he abandoned his studies in Syracuse, and went to Western New York, where in 1896 he obtained a job as a reporter with the Rochester Herald.

== Journalism ==
After three years in Rochester, he obtained reporting and editing jobs with the Glens Falls Times, the Brooklyn Eagle, New York Evening Sun and the New York Herald. He continued writing, with the railroad industry becoming his main interest. For seven years he was press representative for the Brooklyn Rapid Transit Company. He was also advertising manager for Wells Fargo & Company Express, and director of publications at the University of Rochester.

== Railroad exhibitions ==
In 1925, Hungerford approached Daniel Willard, the president of the Baltimore and Ohio Railroad, and offered to write a history of the company, which was shortly to reach its centenary. Willard not only took up the suggestion, but also hired Hungerford to be the B&O's centennial director. Hungerford had seen a railroad celebration in England and created an extravagant exhibition at a park outside Baltimore. The "Fair of the Iron Horse" opened on September 24, 1927, including displays and a two-hour play, Pageant of The Iron Horse. It drew crowds averaging 50,000 a day. "His success in Baltimore became his chief calling card," He created five more transportation pageants during the 1930s including the Rochester Centennial of 1934, the Parade of the Years Pageant in 1936 in Cleveland; and lastly "Railroads on Parade" at the 1939 New York World's Fair. The railroad display at the fair, which lasted until 1940, presented steam, electric and diesel engines brought from Canada, England and Italy. The attraction drew 2.6 million visitors during its two-year run.

== Travel ==
Hungerford traveled annually more than 75,000 rail miles "just for the fun of it" and he calculated that over the years he had ridden more than 1.5 million miles on rails. He traveled occasionally to Europe and was in Italy in 1928 when he was received by Benito Mussolini.

Hungerford continued to ride the rails, and while traveling in California in spring 1948 he was taken ill with an infection. His condition deteriorated on his train ride back to New York, where he was admitted to a hospital. He died at his home in New York City at the age of 72 just nine days after his last transportation pageant, “Wheels A-Rolling”, opened at the Chicago Railroad Fair.

== Works ==
Hungerford was a photographer.

Hungerford wrote for The Saturday Evening Post and Trains Magazine. He also wrote for Harper's Magazine between February 1909 and August 1921.

Hungerford wrote two best selling books, Planning a Trip Abroad and With the Doughboy in France, a journal of experiences of World War I. Other works, include:

- The American book of church services
- The Genesee country & western New York...
- Locomotives on Parade
- The Modern Railroad
- Men of Erie, a story of human effort (1946)
- Railroads on Parade
- A Railroad for Tomorrow
- The romance of a great store
- The Run of the Twentieth Century
- The Story of the Baltimore and Ohio Railroad 1827-1927
- The Story of Louis Sherry and the business he built
- The Story of Public Utilities
- The story of the Rome. Watertown and Ogdensburgh railroad
- The story of the Waldorf-Astoria
- Transport for War
- Daniel WIllard rides the line: The Story of a Great Railroad man
- Wells Fargo: Advancing the American Frontier
- Early Railroads of New York (1932), in the journal New York History, 13(1).
