= Southern Tier Line =

Norfolk Southern rail line in New York and Pennsylvania

Overview
- Status: Active
- Owner: Norfolk Southern Railway
- Locale: Upstate New York, Delaware Water Gap
- Termini: Suffern; Buffalo

Service
- Type: Freight rail
- System: Norfolk Southern
- Operators: Norfolk Southern Railway; Metro-North Railroad; Central New York Railroad

Technical
- Number of tracks: 1-2
- Track gauge: 4 ft 8 1/2 in (1,435 mm) standard gauge

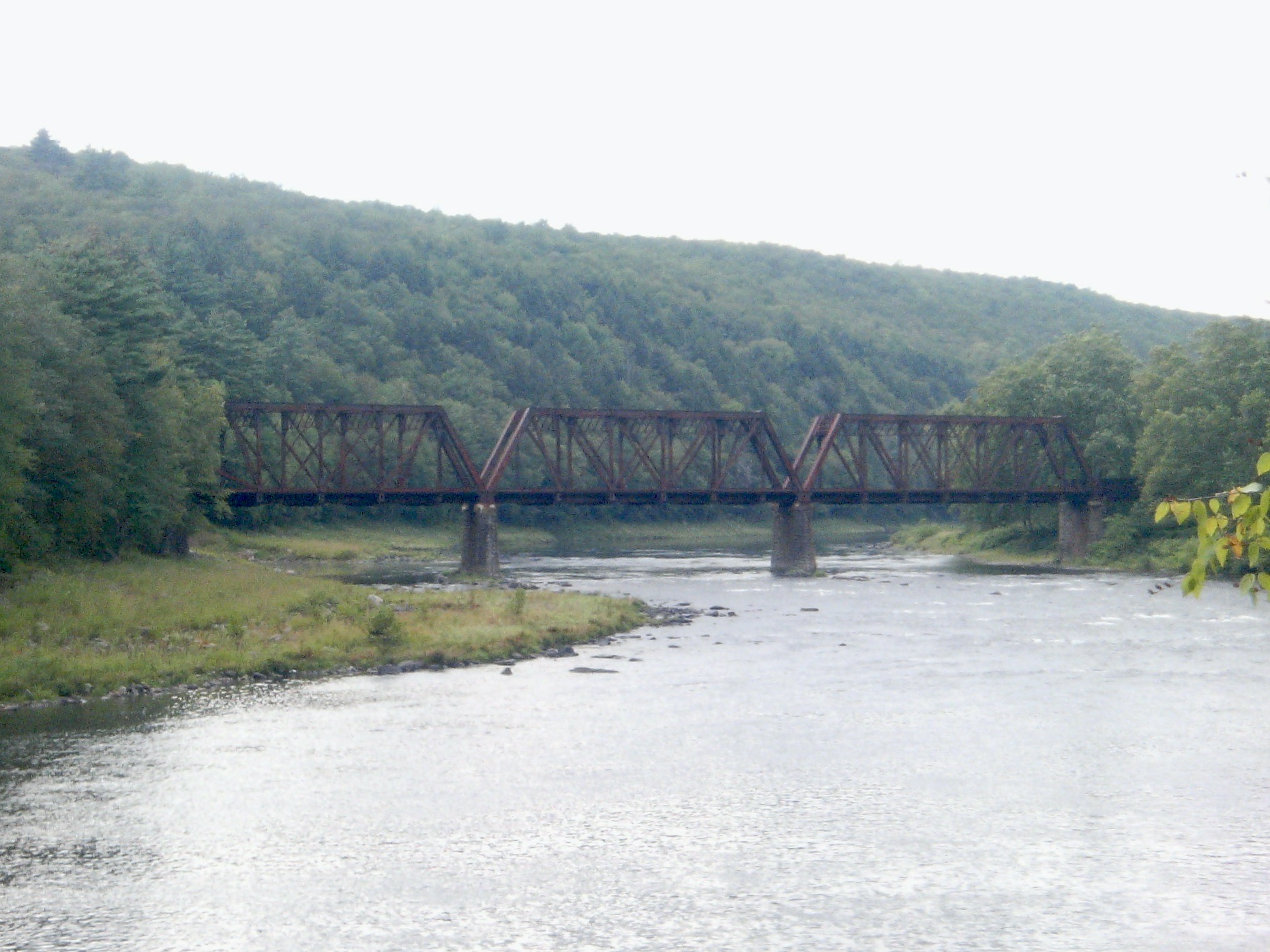
Southern Tier Line railroad bridge over the Delaware River at Tusten NY / Lackawaxen PA

The Southern Tier Line is a railroad line owned and operated by the Norfolk Southern Railway in the U.S. states of New York and Pennsylvania. The line was built by the Erie Railroad and its predecessors and runs from Buffalo, New York, to Suffern, New York. From its east end, NS has trackage rights south on the New Jersey Transit Main and Bergen County Lines to Conrail's North Jersey Shared Assets Area.

From Port Jervis to Binghamton, the line is leased to and maintained by the Central New York Railroad, part of the Delaware Otsego Corporation. It junctions with the Lake Erie District at its west end. Along the way it meets the Corning Secondary at Corning, New York. The Metro-North Railroad leases the line from Suffern to Port Jervis and operates the Port Jervis Line commuter rail service.

== History ==
The oldest piece of the line, from Suffern to Newburgh Junction in Woodbury, New York, opened in 1841 as part of the New York and Erie Rail Road. Extensions opened to Port Jervis and Binghamton in 1848, Owego in 1849, and Dunkirk (leaving the Southern Tier Line at Hornell) in 1851. At the Buffalo end, the Attica and Buffalo Railroad opened from Buffalo east to Attica in 1842, but was part of the New York Central Railroad system until 1852, when it was sold to the Buffalo and New York City Railroad east of Depew. Also in 1852, the Buffalo and New York City Railroad built southeast from Attica to Hornell and west from Depew to Buffalo. The entire line became part of the Erie Railroad through leases and mergers.

Norfolk Southern leased the section between Suffern and Port Jervis to the Metro-North Railroad on March 31, 2003. It leased the section between Port Jervis and Binghamton to the Central New York Railroad on December 31, 2004.

The original Portage Viaduct along the Southern Tier Line in 2009

Nearer the western end, the line passes through Letchworth State Park, and over the Portage Viaduct.

== Bibliography ==
- Hartley, Scott A. (April 2005). "A stretch of the old Erie has another new operator: CNY". Trains. Vol. 65, no. 4. p. 16. ISSN 0041-0934.
- Stamp, Paul (25 January 2022). "Railfanning the NS Southern Tier Line Part 1: Buffalo to Hornell". Railpace Newsmagazine. Bucklin, Missouri: White River Productions. ISSN 0745-5267.
