= Sloat =

Sloat may refer to:

== People ==
- Sloat (surname)

== Other uses ==
- Sloat, California, in Plumas County
- USS Sloat, ships named after John D. Sloat
- Sloat House, in New York State
- Wingtip Sloat, an indie rock band from Virginia.
