= Old Sloatsburg Cemetery =

Historic cemetery in New York, United States

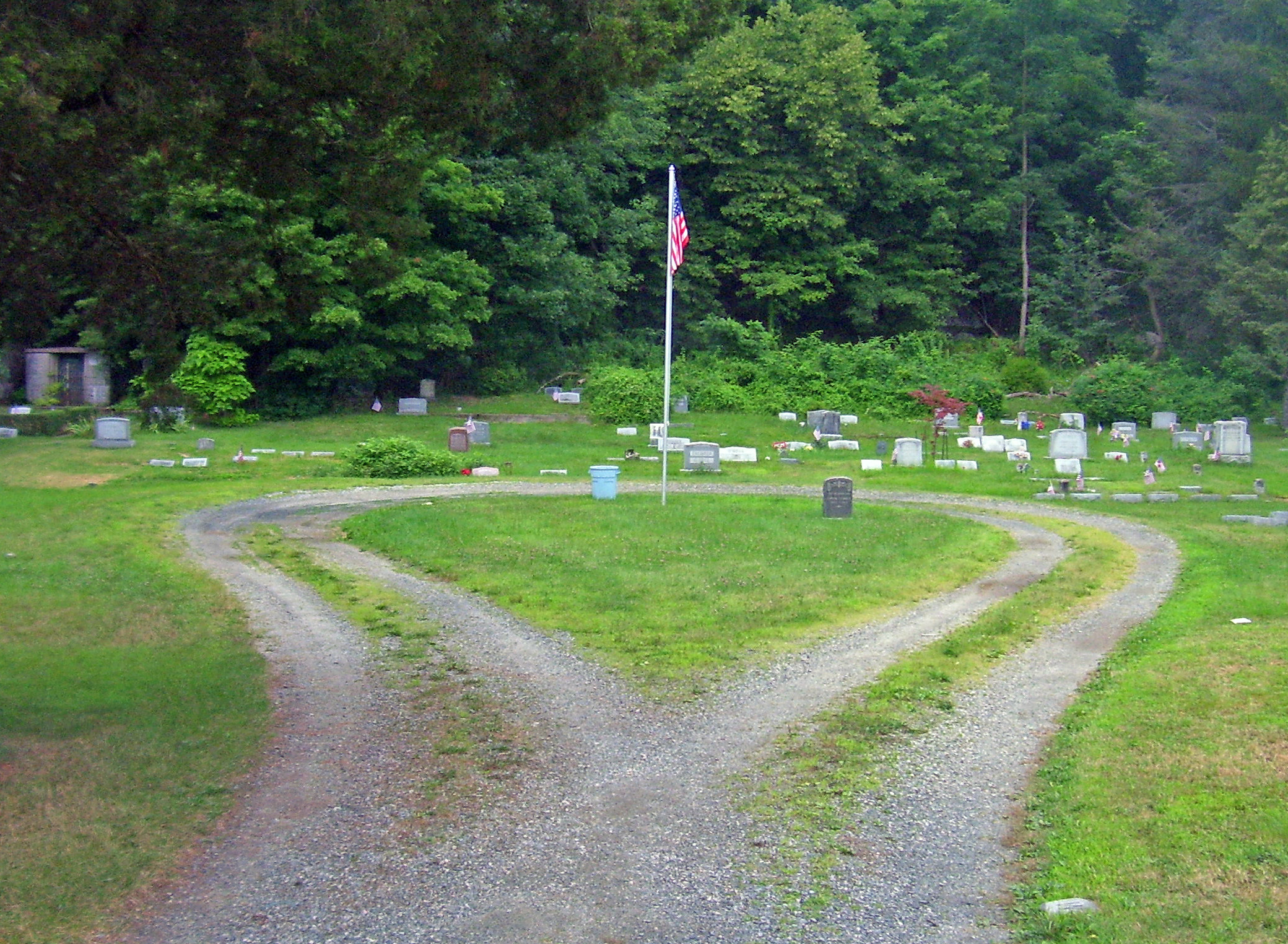
- Waldron section in west end of cemetery
- Interactive map of Old Sloatsburg Cemetery

Details
- Established: 1781
- Location: Richards Road, Sloatsburg, New York
- Country: United States
- Coordinates: 41°09′13″N 74°11′45″W
- Type: public
- Owned by: Town of Ramapo
- Size: 5 acres (2.0 ha)
- No. of graves: 1,200
- Find a Grave: Old Sloatsburg Cemetery
- Old Sloatsburg Cemetery
- U.S. National Register of Historic Places
- Area: 5.5 acres (2.2 ha)
- NRHP reference No.: 99000807
- Added to NRHP: July 23, 1999

The Old Sloatsburg Cemetery is located at the end of Richard Street in Sloatsburg, New York, United States. It began as the Sloat family cemetery with the burial of Revolutionary War casualty John Sloat in 1781. After a half-century of inactivity, it gradually was expanded to include 1,200 graves by the time of the last burial in 1949.

Its landscaping reflects several different eras of cemetery design. In the late 20th century, it became neglected and abandoned other than a few family plots that were maintained by those families. Residents of Sloatsburg organized a cleanup effort in the mid-1990s, which led to the cemetery's listing on the National Register of Historic Places in 1999. It continues to be maintained as a community effort.

== Property ==
The cemetery occupies a rectangular 5-acre (2.0 ha) parcel in the western section of the village, south of Eagle Valley Road and a short distance west of NY 17. The land slopes slightly westward, to a wooded hillside to the west, with a drum-shaped rise in the east where the members of the Sloat family are buried. A gravel road from Eagle Valley leads into the northeast corner of the cemetery, leading first to a circle around the Sloat graves, then heading west to a smaller circle in the Waldron section of the cemetery, near the more recent gravesites, connecting with a dirt path from the end of Richards Road, the only other public access point. Three copses of trees are located throughout the otherwise open lot.

The Sloat family's section is a raised area 20 feet (6.1 m) above grade at the cemetery's eastern boundary. There are 30 gravestones here, starting with John Sloat's in 1781. The rest date from 1838 onward.

To its west is a section known as "The Hill", with 72 stones dating to 1852, probably the date it was opened. They are laid out in a strict grid pattern of 20 by 20 feet (6.1 by 6.1 m) plots. The gently undulating ground, winding roadway and groves show the influence of the mid-19th century Rural Cemetery Movement.

Continuing westward, two sections expanded in the early 20th century maintain the grid pattern but are much more level. The westernmost section of the cemetery, named the Waldron section after a local funeral director who oversaw much of the graves dug here in the second quarter of the 20th century, has four mausolea typical of that era. One memorializes a teenage girl who died in 1933 as a "martyr to the automobile age". Some section terraces nearby may have been meant for future expansions.

== History ==
In 1781, as the Revolutionary War wound down, John Sloat was accidentally shot and killed near the family home by one of the sentries his father had hired. He was buried on the knoll that is now the family's section of the cemetery. His infant son John D. Sloat would eventually become the first Governor of California.

No other Sloats are known to have been buried with John until 1832. The cemetery remained strictly a Sloat family burial ground until 1852, when other members of the growing community joined them. A quarter-century later, in 1878, the Sloatsburg Cemetery Association was formed to manage the cemetery, no longer under family control. The next year it bought the 2.7-acre (1.1 ha) Hill Section from another local family and began selling individual gravesites rather than family plots.

The association transferred the original section back to William Sloat in 1896. A decade later, in 1906, and again in 1912, it bought two acres mores to the west from another family. Local funeral director Warren Waldron bought the last parcel, on the west side, and began dividing it into plots. The association made its last lot sale in 1936 and disbanded. Waldron's, and the cemetery's, last burial took place in 1949.

With no one to look after it, the cemetery reverted to the Town of Ramapo, which includes Sloatsburg. Some families continued to maintain their plots, but as a whole the cemetery fell into overgrown disrepair, with some headstones vandalized and even stolen. It is believed that at least 600 graves remain unmarked. After nearly a half-century of this, the village organized a community cleanup effort in the mid-90s and has kept it up ever since.
