= George E. Archer =

American architect

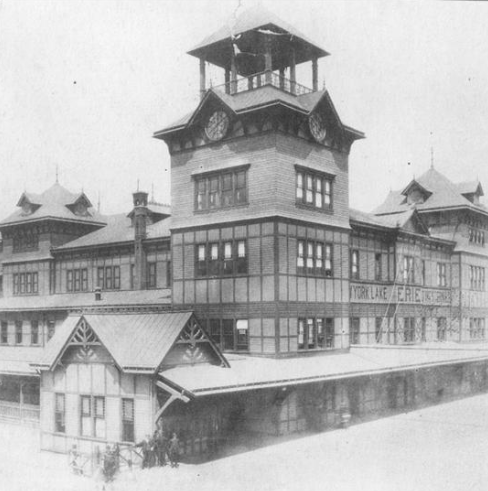
Pavonia Terminal located on the Hudson Waterfront in Jersey City

George Edward Archer (February 15, 1853 – December 3, 1903) was an American architect. He became Chief Architect of the New York, Lake Erie and Western Railroad, later the Erie Railroad, in 1886, where he was responsible for planning and supervising the construction of stations, docks, piers and other structures for the railroad between New York and Chicago. Several stations built in the late 19th century in New Jersey and Upstate New York are attributed to him.

As a young man Archer was educated at Amesbury, Massachusetts, and later graduated from the Massachusetts Institute of Technology. After working in a variety of jobs – as an architect apprentice, florist, and woodcarver – he moved to New Albany, Indiana, as a bookkeeper for a lumber company. He returned to the east in the early 1880s and worked for the Chief Engineer of the New York & New England Railroad. Later he worked for the Pennsylvania Railroad at Columbus, Ohio. He then worked for the Wilmington & Northern Railroad, until moving to the Erie.

== Personal life ==
Archer was born in New York City, the son of Stephen Durkee Archer and Mary Magray. He married Catherine Henry. He died at home in Nutley, New Jersey, in 1903. He is interred at Laurel Grove Memorial Park, in Totowa, New Jersey.

== Erie Railroad stations ==
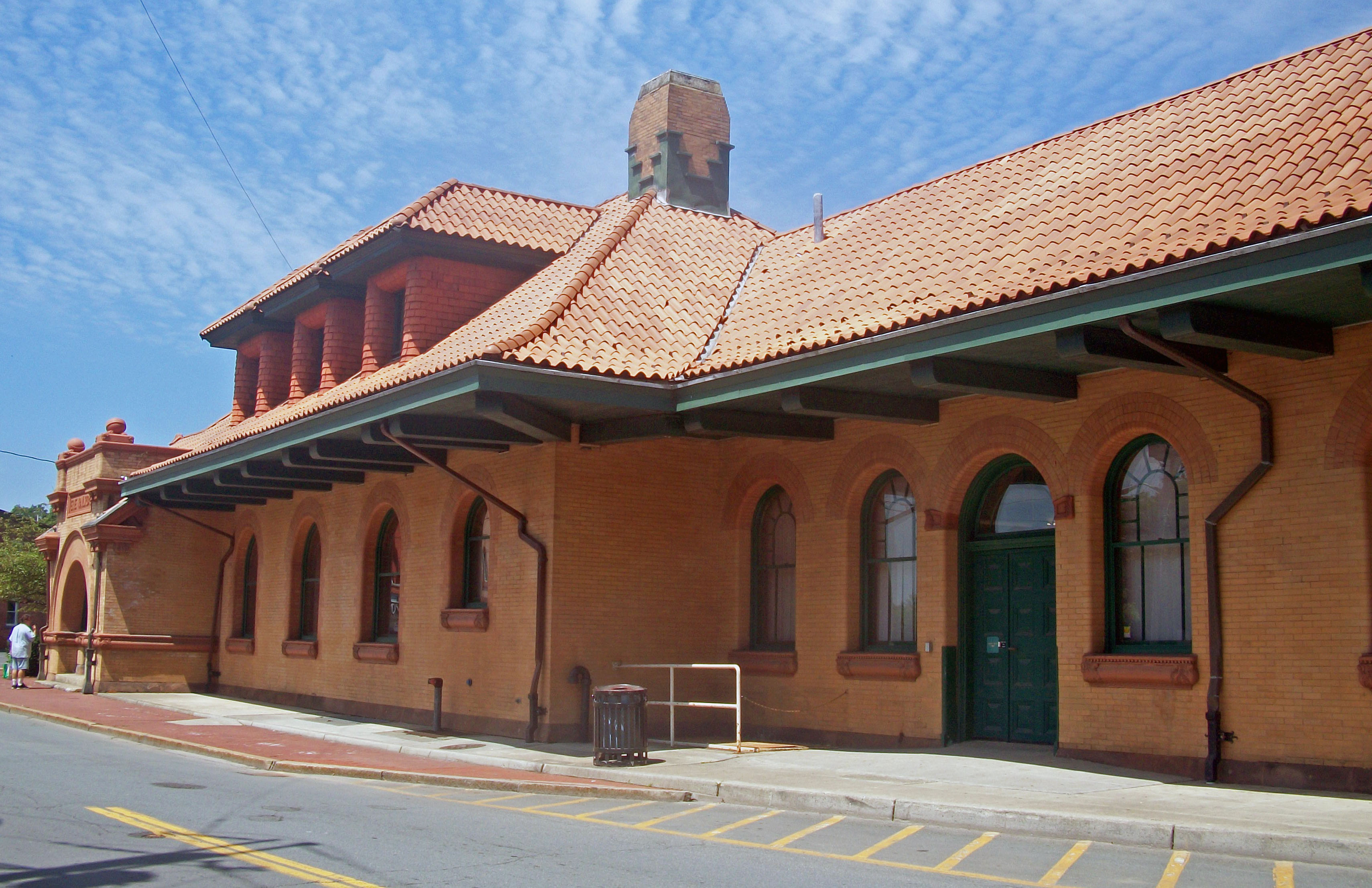
Thrall Library in Middletown

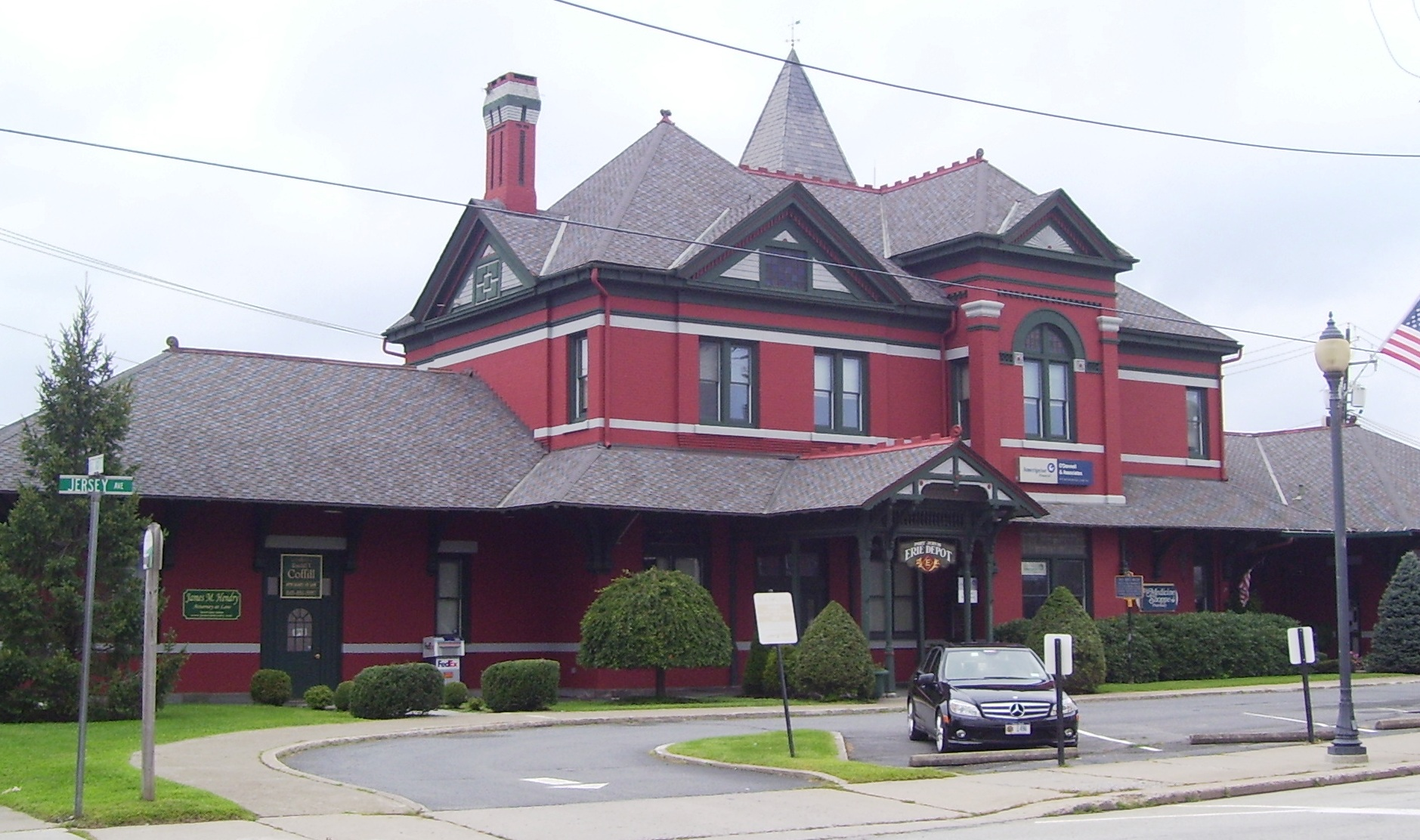
Former Erie Depot in Port Jervis, New York

- Pavonia Terminal, Jersey City, New Jersey (1887), razed 1961
- Middletown, New York (1896) now Thrall Library (opened 1995); replaced by Middletown Metro-North station in Middletown, New York
- Erie Railroad Depot (Rochester, New York) (1893), service discontinued 1941
- Port Jervis, New York (1892) replaced by the Port Jervis Metro-North station
- White Star Line Pier, West Street, New York City.

== See also ==
- Bradford Gilbert
- Frank J. Nies, DL&W Railroad contemporary
