= Sloat (surname) =

Sloat is a surname. Notable people with the surname include:

- Ann Sloat (1928–2017), Canadian politician
- Barbara Sloat, American biologist
- Donald Sloat (1949–1970), Medal of Honor recipient
- John D. Sloat (1781–1867), American naval commodore who claimed California for the US
- Lefty Sloat (1918–2003), American baseball player
- Micah Sloat (b. 1981), American actor and musician
