= Tuxedo station =

Metro-North Railroad station in New York

Tuxedo
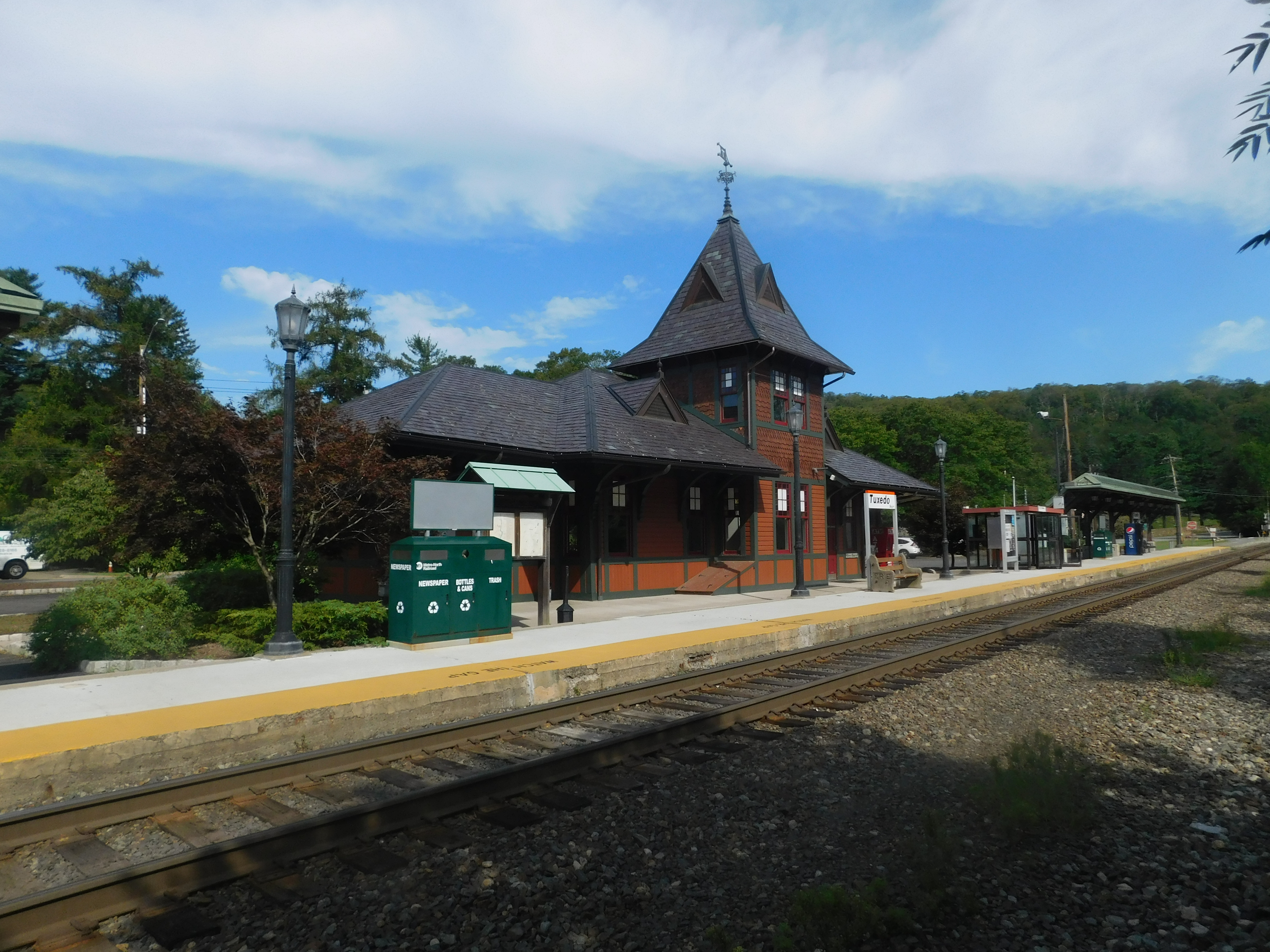
- Tuxedo station in August 2024 from the abandoned westbound platform.

General information
- Location: 240 Route 17; Tuxedo Park, New York
- Coordinates: 41°11′38″N 74°11′05″W
- Owner: Metro-North Railroad
- Line: NS Southern Tier Line
- Platforms: 1 side platform
- Tracks: 1
- Connections: Short Line Bus: 17M/MD

Construction
- Structure type: At-grade
- Parking: 245 spaces
- Accessible: No

Other information
- Station code: 2511 (Erie Railroad)

History
- Opened: Spring 1880
- Rebuilt: 1885, c. 2010s
- Former names: Lorillard's

Key dates
- August 1966: Station agent eliminated

Services
Preceding station	Metro-North Railroad	Following station
Harriman toward Port Jervis	Port Jervis Line	Sloatsburg toward Hoboken
Former services
Preceding station	Erie Railroad	Following station
Southfields toward Chicago	Main Line	Sloatsburg toward Jersey City
Preceding station	Metro-North Railroad	Following station
Harriman Closed 1983 toward Port Jervis	Port Jervis Line	Sloatsburg toward Hoboken
- Tuxedo Park Railroad Station
- U.S. National Register of Historic Places
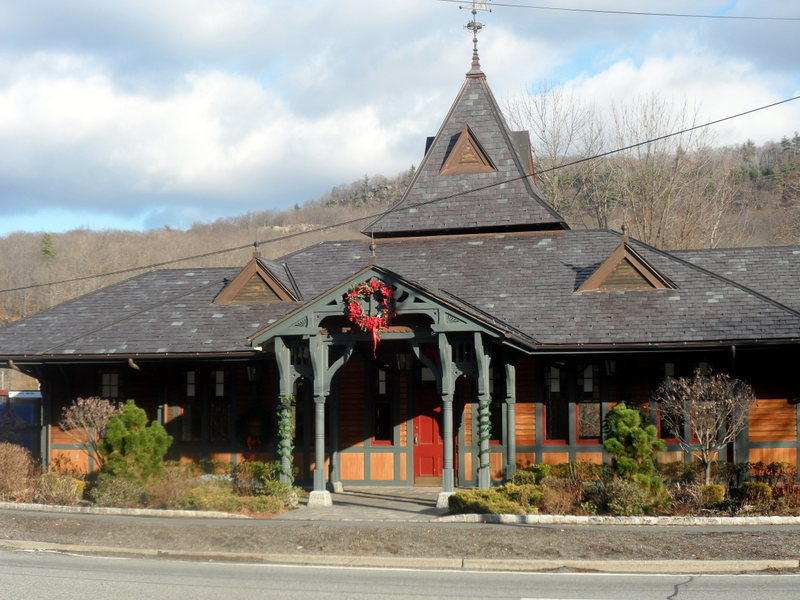
- Tuxedo station building, built in 1885 and renovated in the early 2010s
- Area: less than one acre
- Built: 1886
- Architect: Bruce Price
- Architectural style: Late Victorian
- NRHP reference No.: 00001529
- Added to NRHP: December 13, 2000
Location

Tuxedo station is an active commuter railroad station in the town of Tuxedo, Orange County, New York. Located on the eastern side of State Route 17 south of East Village Road, the station serves trains of Metro-North Railroad's Port Jervis Line, which operates between Port Jervis station in Port Jervis, New York and Hoboken Terminal in Hoboken, New Jersey. The Port Jervis Line is operated by NJ Transit under contract with Metro-North Railroad. Tuxedo station contains a single low-level side platform and a single operating track. Tuxedo station contains a 245-station parking lot and a nearby lot for the New York State Department of Environmental Conservation (NYSDEC). The station also serves as the western terminus of the Ramapo–Dunderberg Trail, a hiking trail through Harriman State Park.

A station in the area was established in the spring of 1880 on the Erie Railroad main line on land owned by the Lorillard family, a tract of 11,000 acres (4,500 ha). This station would be named Lorillard's. In late 1885, the Lorillard family began construction of a new sportsman's park known as Tuxedo Lake. Tuxedo Lake would involve 6,000 acres (2,400 ha) in Sterling Forest for people to perform recreational activities. The station depot at Lorillard's would be replaced with a new structure that would be considered one of the better ones on the Erie Railroad.

== Station layout and structure ==
The station has one track and a low-level side platform. It is the only stop along the line that retains the old station at the current station site. It was built in 1885 as one of the original Tuxedo Park buildings, designed by architect Bruce Price, and was listed as Tuxedo Park Railroad Station on the National Register of Historic Places in 2000. It contains a waiting room and a community room often used by the Boy/Girl Scouts and other Tuxedo clubs and organizations.

In 2009 the town, which owns the building, spent $1 million to restore it to what historians believe was its original appearance. The train station currently displays artwork by long-time Tuxedo Park resident and artist Robert Bero. The pieces, a gift from his estate, include woodcuts, etchings and drawings.

== Bibliography ==
- Myles, William J.; Chazin, Daniel T. (2010). Harriman Trails: A Guide and History (3rd ed.). Mahwah, New Jersey: New York–New Jersey Trail Conference. ISBN 9781880775660.
