= Sloatsburg station =

Metro-North Railroad station in New York

Sloatsburg
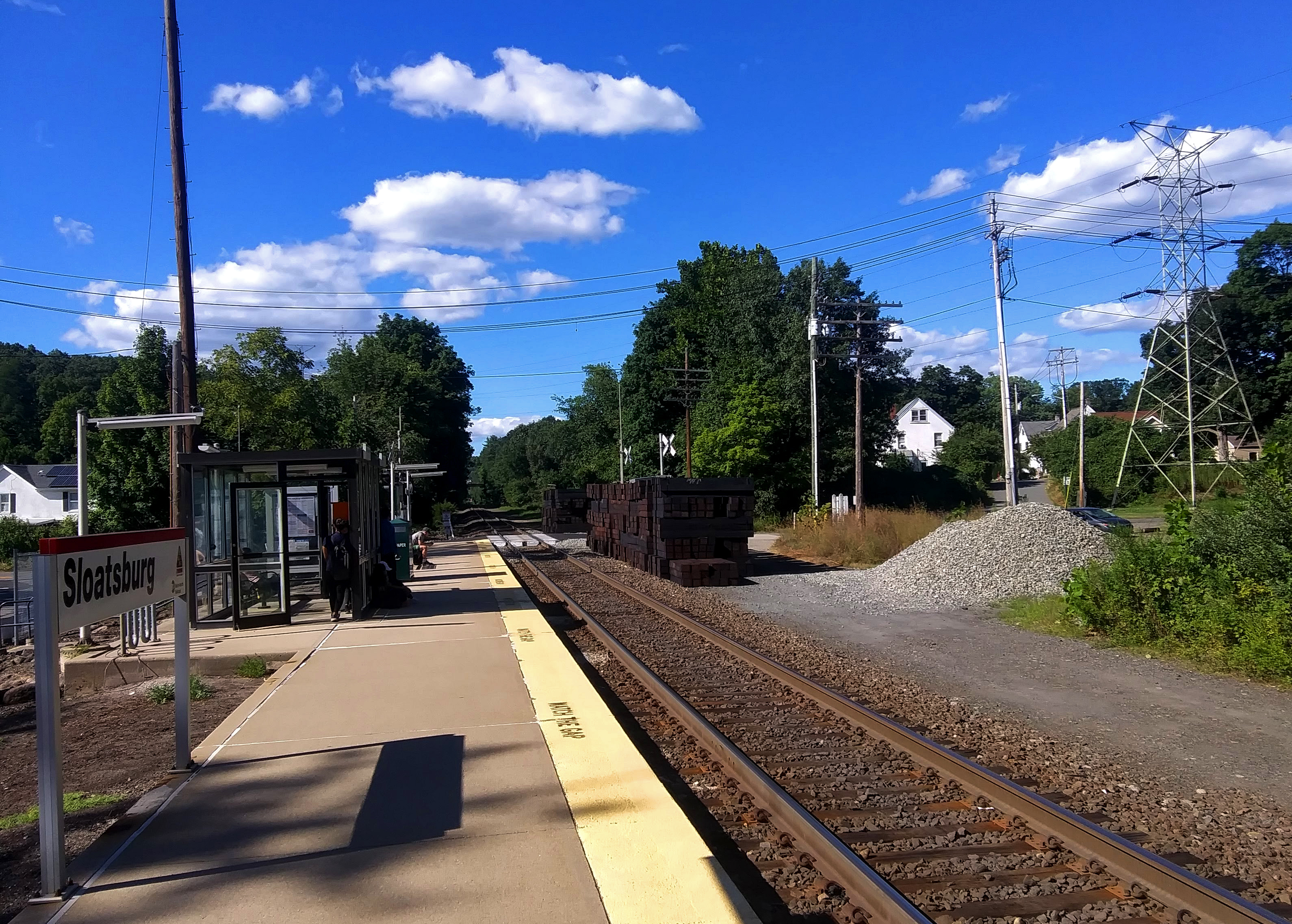
- Sloatsburg station platform, looking north

General information
- Location: Mill Street at Municipal Plaza and Ballard Avenue; Sloatsburg, New York
- Coordinates: 41°09′26″N 74°11′29″W
- Owner: Metro-North Railroad
- Line: NS Southern Tier Line
- Platforms: 1 side platform
- Tracks: 1
- Connections: Transport of Rockland: 93 (on NY 17); Short Line Bus: 100, 300, 400, 500 (on NY 17 at Mill Street)

Construction
- Structure type: At-grade
- Parking: 80 spaces
- Accessible: No

Other information
- Station code: 2509 (Erie Railroad)

History
- Opened: c. 1848 (Erie Railroad)

Services
Preceding station	Metro-North Railroad	Following station
Tuxedo toward Port Jervis	Port Jervis Line	Suffern toward Hoboken
Former services
Preceding station	Erie Railroad	Following station
Tuxedo toward Chicago	Main Line	Sterlington toward Jersey City
Location

Sloatsburg is a commuter railroad station in the eponymous village of Sloatsburg, Rockland County, New York. Located at the intersection of Municipal Plaza, Ballard Avenue and Mill Street, the station serves trains of Metro-North Railroad's Port Jervis Line, operated by NJ Transit via the latter's Main and Bergen County Lines from Hoboken Terminal in Hoboken, New Jersey to Port Jervis station in Port Jervis, New York. As the station is north of Suffern station and Hillburn Yard, the station has limited service. Sloatsburg station contains a single low-level side platform that parallels Mill Street, along with an 80-space parking lot.

Construction of the Sloatsburg station dates back to the 1830s, when the station was built along the Erie Railroad. The station served the line heading to Port Jervis northward, along with a stagecoach to Greenwood Lake three times a day. The station was populated by fishermen on their way to the lake, but has been the site of several accidents. These calamities include a derailed milk train in 1843 and a fatal accident between the train line and several mules and their owner in 1855. The station became part of Metro-North in 1983, when the service was created. The station was listed under a revitalization plan in 2005 to help serve its commuters.

== History ==
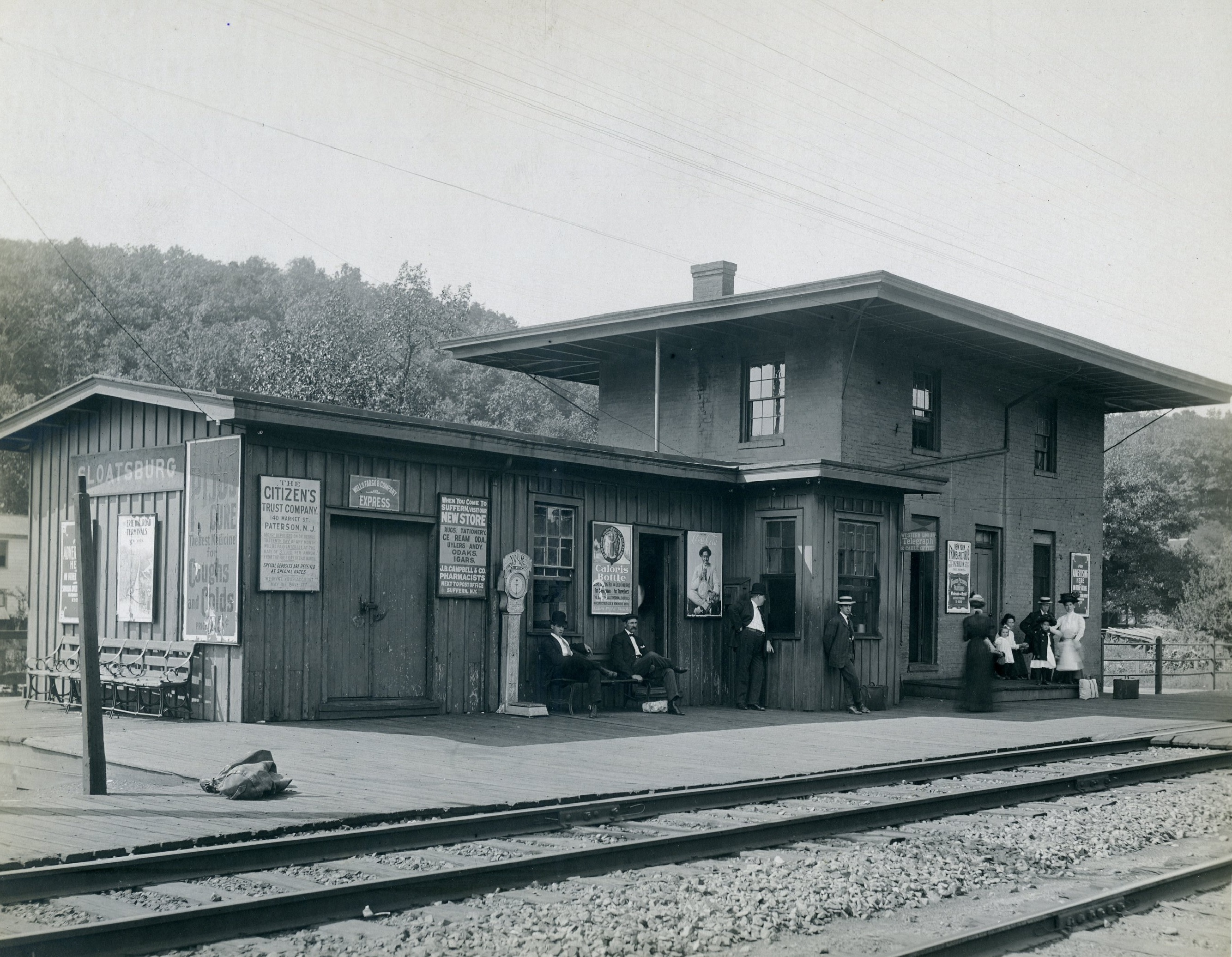
The former station depot at Sloatsburg in December 1909

The Erie Railroad was constructed through Sloatsburg from 1836 to 1841, helping with the prosperity of the village, along with its population. The station was also near the Sterlington one, but it never served of great importance. The Sloatsburg station building was built in 1868 as a two-story brick facade with a tin roof. The style of the building, according to the railroad's 1920 engineering report, is a Type 6A style, with dimensions of 17' x 29.5' x 19'. The station was equipped to host as a base for XG Radio from the Suffern Tower (SF) in Suffern. The Sloatsburg station served well for the nearby Greenwood Lake, with a stagecoach leaving the station three times day. The stagecoach was mainly inhabited by fishermen on their way to Greenwood Lake.

The station has been the site of several major accidents involving locomotives. In 1843, the Sloatsburg station was the site of a large accident by train full of milk bottles. On December 31, 1855, the railroad's Cincinnati Express was thrown off the tracks near the Sloatsburg station, when it tried to avoid a countrymen and his four mules, who were crossing the tracks. Three of the mules were killed and mutilated by the train, while the fourth died soon after. There was no damage to the cars or injuries to the passengers. In the early days of August 1856, a girl by the name of McGraff was injured by an oncoming train near the station after carelessly walking onto the tracks. The parents, who were in a poor state financially, was given $45 (1856 USD) in return for their troubles from the Board of Directors in nearby Goshen. On February 21, 1858, a train heading southbound experienced an accident when a brakeman, John Freeland, fell off the train and was run over. Freeland's legs were severed in the incident, and one arm was broken. They hurried Freeland southbound on a nearby train, but died by the time the train reached Paterson, New Jersey towards the hospital.

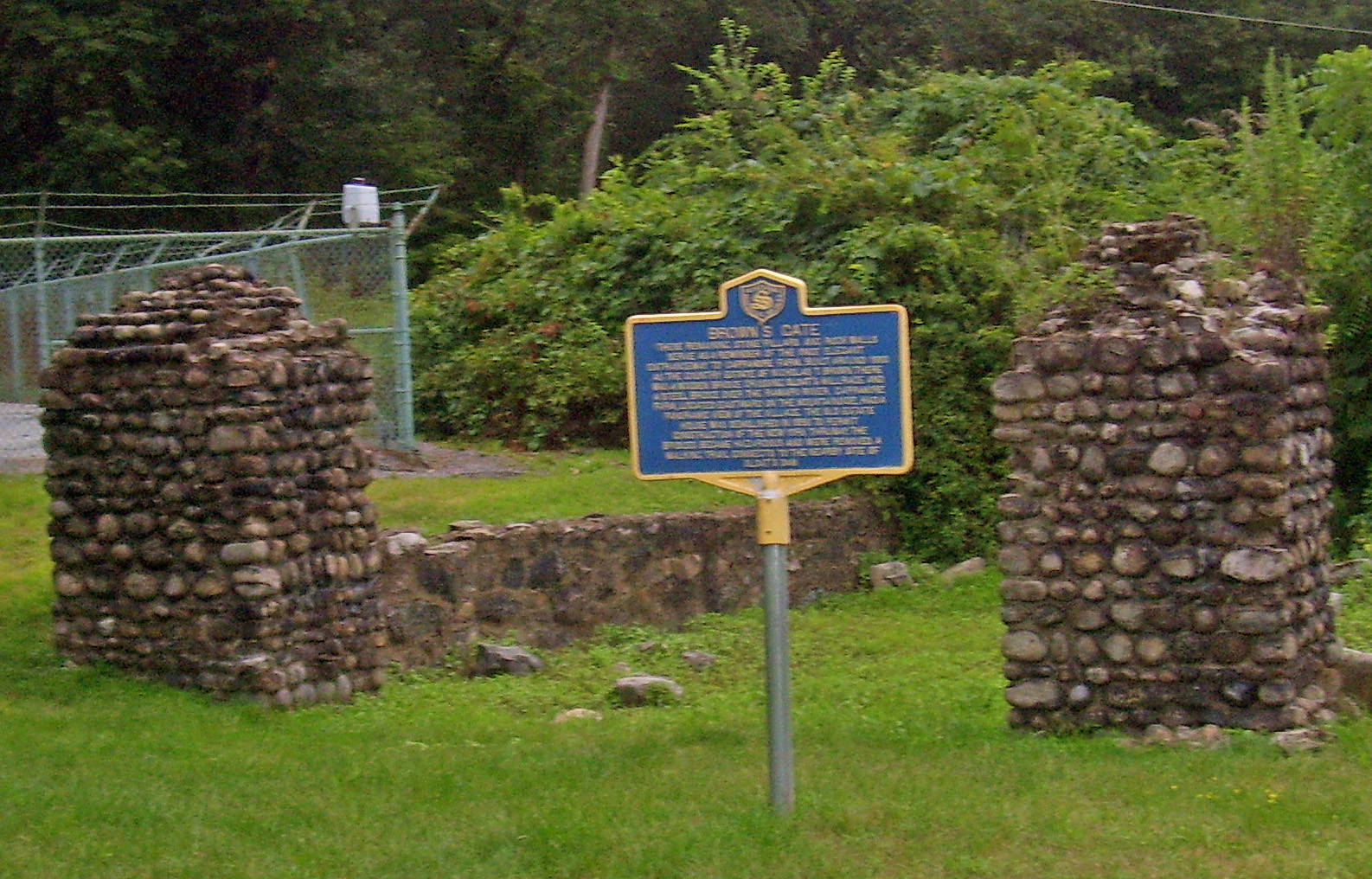
Brown Estate gateposts

The station is also close to the original entrance gate to Sloatsburg's Cappamore Farm. The house in the nearby mountainside was built around 1900 as an estate for Nicholas T. Brown, a local alderman from Paterson, New Jersey. This estate and farm gave a panoramic view of the countryside around Sloatsburg. The house was demolished during the construction of the New York State Thruway in 1956. The steel bridge over the Ramapo River and the wooden bridge over Sloat's Millrace were removed as they had become hazardous. Today, all that remains are the stone pillar entranceway, and a walking trail to the nearby Sloat's Dam. The gateposts are listed on the National Register of Historic Places along with the remaining mill and dam structures since they used the same stonework.

In June 2005, the Metropolitan Transit Authority hinted to village officials that they were looking at renovating Sloatsburg station. At this time, the station consisted of an aluminum shelter with broken windows on the open platform. With the information that the state organization was looking at renovating the station, officials with the village of Sloatsburg and its Downtown Revitalization Committee looked at their part in contributing to the change. One of their stated interests was to make a new station a major spot in the village. Jeff Livingston, an architect who served on the committee, offered his own preliminary design that would put a roof on the station, adding proper ramps to allow handicap accessibility and a new shelter similar to one offered at Mahwah station in Bergen County, New Jersey. The new design would also expand the parking lot, allowing 50 more spots for the station. Livingston added that the village wanted to use a $50,000 grant from the state of New York to work on building the new parking lot.

== Station layout ==
Sloatsburg station contains a single low-level concrete side platform that services the one track of the Port Jervis Line. As a result, the station is not accessible for handicapped persons to use. The station shelter is located on the platform and contains the single ticket vending machine. Sloatsburg station has an 80-space parking lot on Mill Street, operated by the village of Sloatsburg. Two bus services offer to Service near Sloatsburg station. The Transport of Rockland bus no. 93 goes through Sloatsburg on a loop during rush hour and mid-day service, with access available on New York State Route 17 (Orange Turnpike) in the village a block west of the station. Service runs east to Pearl River. ShortLine Hudson, operated by Coach USA, has a station stop at Route 17 and Mill Street to the southwest of the station, offering services to New York City, Orange County municipalities and Ulster County locations.

== Bibliography ==
- Mott, Edward Harold (1908). Between the Ocean and the Lakes: The Story of Erie. New York, New York: Ticker Publishing Company.
