= Middletown station (Erie Railroad) =

Railroad station in Middletown, New York

Middletown
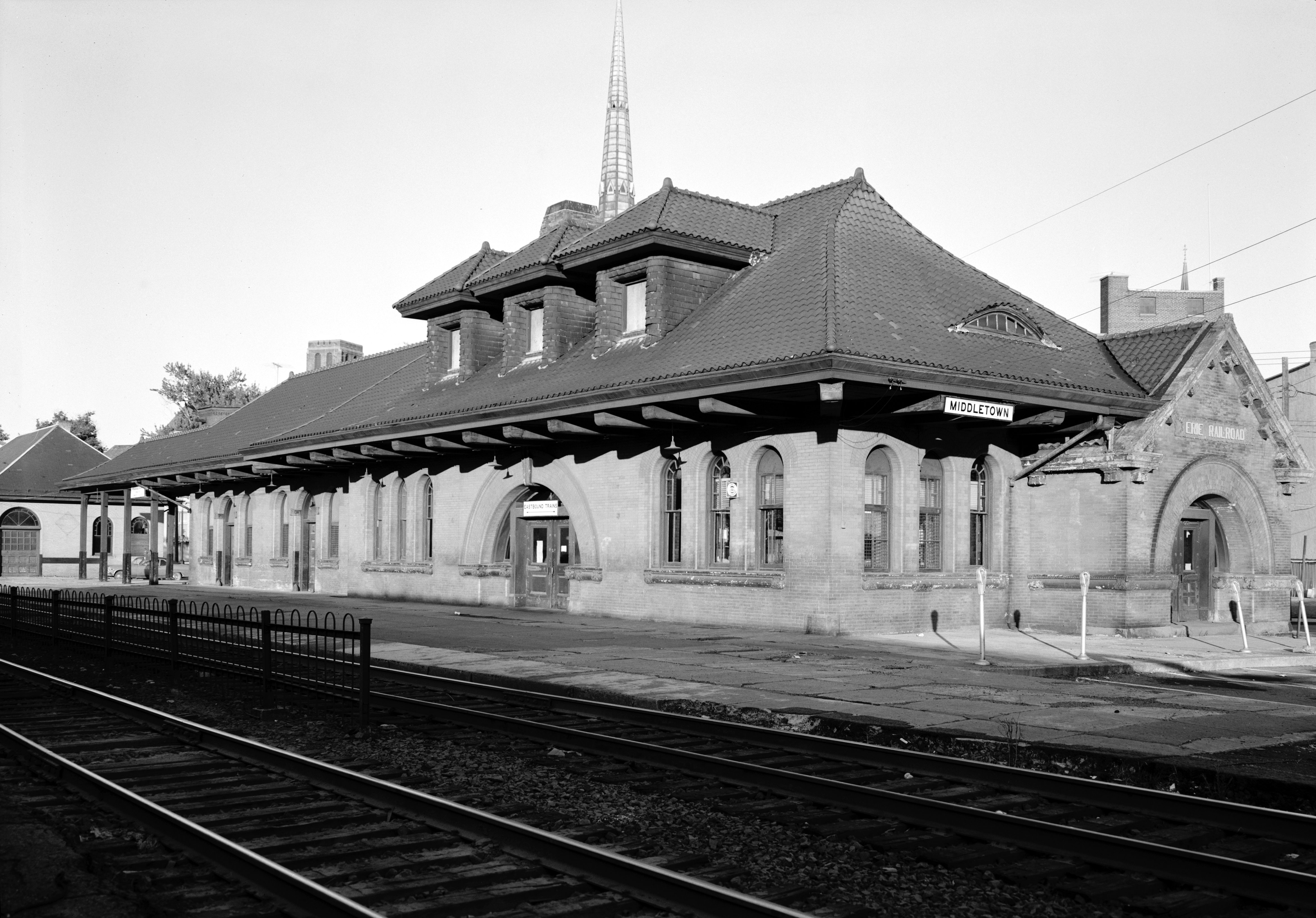
- The Middletown station, seen trackside in 1971

General information
- Location: 11–19 Depot Street, Middletown, New York 10940
- Coordinates: 41°26′50″N 74°25′12″W
- Owner: Erie Railroad (1843–1960); Erie–Lackawanna Railroad (1960–1976); Conrail (1976–1983); Metro-North Railroad (1983)
- Lines: Erie Railroad Main Line (New York Division); Middletown and Crawford Branch
- Platforms: 1 side platforms
- Tracks: 2 main line

Construction
- Platform levels: 1

Other information
- Station code: 2665

History
- Opened: May 26, 1843
- Closed: April 18, 1983
- Rebuilt: August 15–September 24, 1896

Former services
Preceding station	Metro-North Railroad	Following station
Otisville toward Port Jervis	Port Jervis Line Closed 1983	Goshen toward Hoboken
Preceding station	Erie Railroad	Following station
Howells toward Chicago	Main Line	Main Street, Middletown toward Jersey City
Circleville toward Pine Bush	Middletown and Crawford Branch	Terminus
Location

Middletown was the main station along the Erie Railroad mainline in the city of Middletown, New York. Located on Depot Street, the station was first opened in 1843 with the construction of the New York, Lake Erie and Western Railroad, which had originally terminated at Goshen. The station was located along the New York Division, which stretched from Pavonia Terminal in Jersey City, New Jersey, to the Sparrowbush station just north of Port Jervis.

The building was opened in 1896 to replace one that had been in use since 1843 when the New York and Erie began service to the city. The Romanesque Revival building was designed by George E. Archer, Chief Architect of the New York, Lake Erie and Western Railroad, later the Erie Railroad. The station saw service for trains going from Chicago to Erie's terminal in Jersey City, and later, as part of Erie Lackawanna Railway, service to Hoboken Terminal. The last long distance train along this route was the Atlantic Express and Pacific Express in 1965. The station also saw regular commuter service.

The building served as a railroad station until 1983, when rail service was taken over by MTA's Metro-North Railroad. Service on the route of Erie's original Main Line was discontinued in favor of the Graham Line, an Erie-built freight line now used by Norfolk Southern and the Port Jervis Line and was replaced by the Middletown Metro-North station.

The station depot was renovated and restored, becoming the Thrall Library in 1995.

== See also ==
- List of Erie Railroad structures documented by the Historic American Engineering Record
- Middletown and New Jersey Railroad
- Orange Heritage Trailway
