= Robert Bero =

American artist (1941-2007)

- Born: 1941
- Died: 2007 (aged 65–66)
- Education: B.F.A., Pratt Institute; M.F.A., Yale University
- Known for: printmaker, artist
- Notable work: First Snow, Small Poplar, Large Poplar
- Awards: Louis Comfort Tiffany Award, Fulbright Grant, Benicke Grant, Purchase Prizes from the Library of Congress

Robert Bero (1941–2007) was an American artist and print maker. Known for his etchings and woodcuts, Bero also worked in pen and ink, crayon, pastel, pencil, water color and collage. He served on the faculties of the State Universities of New York at Potsdam and at Purchase, Ramapo College in New Jersey and Brown University in Rhode Island. A long-time resident of Tuxedo Park, New York, in 2009 the town put up an exhibition of his work at the newly restored, historic Tuxedo Park Train Station.

== Education ==
Bero was born in Brooklyn, New York and attended Poly Prep Country Day School, graduating in 1959. He earned a BFA from the Pratt Institute in Fine Arts (Highest Honors) and an MFA in Painting and Printmaking from Yale University, where he served as an assistant to etching professor Gabor Peterdi.

== Career ==
Bero had a long and productive career as a printmaker, artist and educator. He was first accorded a major retrospective exhibition at Nyack's Edward Hopper Foundation in 1978. Since that time, his prints have been exhibited at the Library of Congress, the Smithsonian Institution, Cornell University, Yale University, the Museum of Fine Arts, Cincinnati, and at the Society of American Graphic Artists. His art has received numerous awards and grants, including the Louis Comfort Tiffany Award, a Fulbright Grant, the Benicke Grant and Purchase Prizes from the Library of Congress. Some of his best known pieces include First Snow, Small Poplar, and Large Poplar.

== Teaching ==
Bero began his teaching career at the State University of New York at Potsdam, where he worked as an assistant professor from 1967 until 1973. He then joined the faculty of Brown University as an assistant professor. From 1974 until 1982 he was assistant professor at Ramapo College's School of Contemporary Arts, serving as Chairperson from 1978 until 1980. From 2001 onwards, he was an associate professor at the State University of New York at Purchase.

== Exhibitions and reviews ==
D. Dominick Lombardi of the New York Times, reviewing Bero's exhibition at Dobbs Ferry's Hudson River Gallery, wrote that: “… Robert Bero expands the visual language of a familiar genre. In Mr. Bero's case, it is the landscape. Using a multitude of mediums including woodcut, conte crayon and watercolor he renders the intricacies of the natural world in a very intense way. Dancing leaves, flitting snowflakes, twisting tree limbs—everything one notices when looking carefully and systematically at nature can be found here. Most impressive are two works: 'Winter Woods Tuxedo Park,' and an untitled watercolor, pastel and conte crayon work…As part of the exhibition, the handmade laminated birch wood plate, his wooden baren used in place of a press, and the carving tool used to create 'Winter Woods Tuxedo Park' is placed nearby so gallery visitors can get some idea of the dedication and skill needed to produce such a monumental work.”

=== List of exhibitions ===
- Society of American Graphic Artists, NY, 1993.
- Selected Prints, John Szoke Gallery, NY, 1993
- Giles Abrieux Fine arts, Big Prints, Chicago, 1994
- Sylvan Cole Gallery, Selected Prints, NY, 1955
- Selected Works, John Davidson Gallery, NY, 1995
- Center for Graphic Arts, Portland Art Museum, 1997
- Bucknell, University, PA, 1997
- Galerie Lelong, Zurich, Switzerland, 1998
- Contemporary American Landscapes, Cologne, Germany, 1999
- Sylvan Cole Fine Arts, New York City, 1999
- Contemporary Art Center, 1999
- Art/31/Basel, Switzerland, 1999
- Lillehammer Art Museum, Norway, 2001
- Aldis Browne Fine Arts, Venice, CA, 1999, 2000
- Watermark Cargo Gallery, NY, 2000
- Gallery Gertrude Stein, 2001
- American Fine Arts Company, New York City, 2002
- Watermark Gallery, Greenport, NY, 2002
- Bronxville Art Center, 2002
- Nobu Fine Arts, London England, 2002
- Watermark Cargo Gallery, NY, 2003
- Hudson River Gallery, NY, 2003
- Galerie Rienzo, NY, 2003
