= Sloat, California =

Unincorporated community in California, United States

Sloat
- Unincorporated community
- Location in California Sloat (the United States)
- Coordinates: 39°52′00″N 120°43′39″W
- Country: United States
- State: California
- County: Plumas
- Elevation: 4,131 ft (1,259 m)

Sloat is an unincorporated community in Plumas County, California, United States. It lies at an elevation of 4131 feet (1259 m). Sloat is located on the Western Pacific Railroad, 8.5 miles (13.7 km) northwest of Blairsden.

The place was named in 1910 to honor Commodore John D. Sloat. The Sloat post office opened in 1914. Sloat, California also is related to Sloatsburg, New York.
