= Sloat's Dam and Mill Pond =

- U.S. National Register of Historic Places
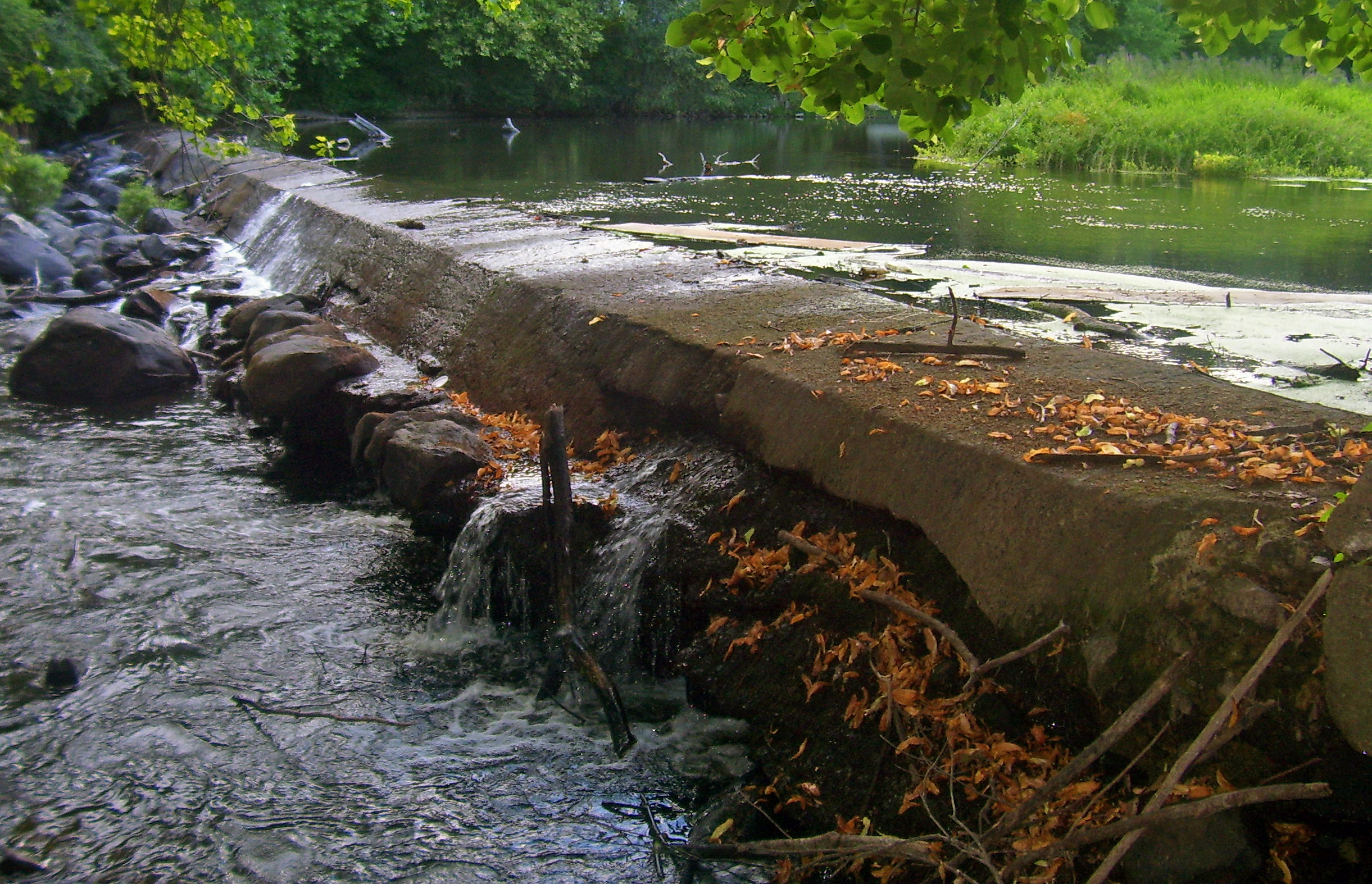
- View west across dam, 2008
- Location: Sloatsburg, NY
- Coordinates: 41°09′27″N 74°11′20″W
- Area: 15 acres (6.1 ha)
- Built: 1792
- Architect: Isaac Sloat
- NRHP reference No.: 00000344
- Added to NRHP: April 6, 2000

Sloat's Dam and Mill Pond is located between Waldron Terrace and Ballard Avenue in Sloatsburg, New York, United States. The 200-foot–long (60 m) concrete dam creates the mill pond north of it by impounding the Ramapo River.

It was created by Stephen Sloat in 1792, and renovated two decades later. It was the earliest of three dams on the river in today's Rockland County that supported milling operations; today it is the only one that remains mostly intact, although the mill shut down after a mid-20th century fire. In 2000 it and several accessory structures were listed on the National Register of Historic Places.

== Property ==
The dam, mill pond and associated structures are located within a 15 acres (6.1 ha) rectangular area owned by the county. Most of that land is covered by the mill pond. The dam itself, located just west of Waldron Terrace where it runs parallel to the New York State Thruway, is 200 feet (60 m) long, four feet (1.1 m) high at its highest and about as wide. It is of concrete covering the original stonework. At the west end of the dam is a stone sluice gate at the end of a mill race. The mill pond itself is a popular local fishing hole.

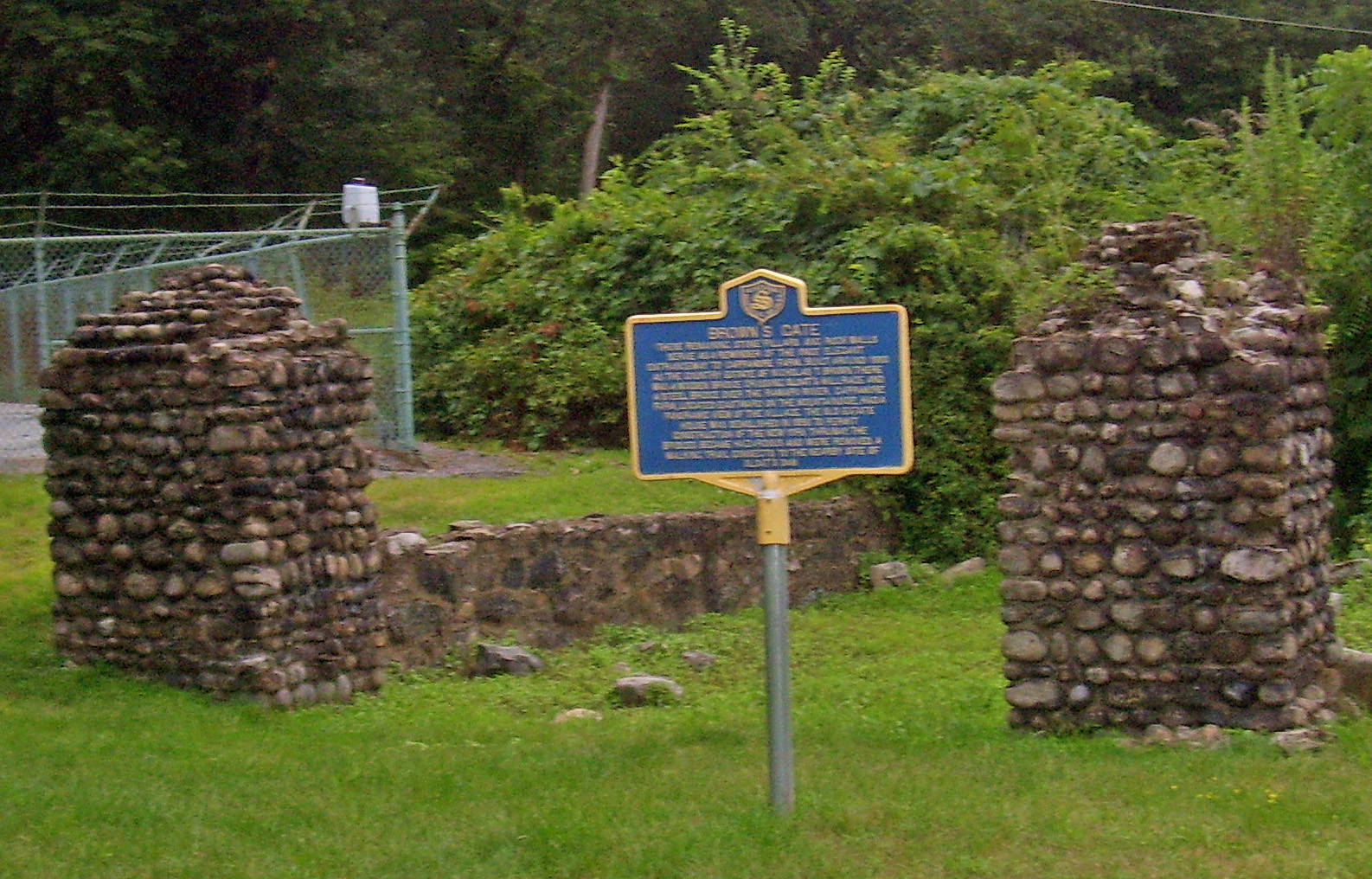
The Brown estate gateposts

At the southwest corner of the parcel are the remaining stone gateposts from the Brown Estate, which included the entire mill property during the early 20th century. They are located just off Station Road, next to an electrical substation just east of the train station. There is a historical marker nearby as they are the most visible component of the listing.

The gateposts had no direct connection to the mills. They are considered a contributing resource to the Register listing due to their age and the similarity of their stonework to contemporaneous renovations to the mill structures. Little remains of the actual mill buildings, which were mostly razed in the 1960s, and what does is not considered contributing.

== History ==
Isaac Sloat, son of original Sloatsburg settler William, built the original stone dam across the Ramapo in 1792 to power a sawmill and tannery. Two other millers soon followed, above and below the present dam. Sloat's son Jacob reinforced the dam with concrete in 1815 before expanding the mill to produce textiles.

His business prospered, helped in later decades by the nearby route of the New York and Erie Railroad, and he expanded the mill several times before retiring in 1851. The Sloatsburg Manufacturing Company, which took over from him, again expanded the mill six years later, in 1857.

In 1878 it went bankrupt as a delayed result of the Panic of 1873. A new owner, William McCullough, took it over four years later and began producing silk. Around 1900 the mill became part of the property of Cappamore, the estate of Nicholas Brown, which overlooked Sloatsburg from the east. The stone gateposts were built at this time. Shortly afterwards, the flood of 1903, which wiped out the other two dams in the area, severely damaged the mill's infrastructure and it had to shut down.

The Ramapo Piece and Dye Works took over in 1907 and made the first renovations in nearly a century. They built the stone sluice gate on the site of the original wooden one, in cobblestone similar to that used on the gateposts. At this time it seems that they also shored up the dam.

In 1931, what was now called the Ramapo Finishing Company tore down the older sections of the factory. They continued to use the rest of it until it was severely damaged in a 1955 fire. The year after, Cappamore was demolished as part of the Thruway construction. The remaining mill buildings themselves were leveled in 1966 for a redevelopment that was never completed and the race was filled in after a drowned death in the remaining water.

The mill property, and some other riverfront acreage, was acquired by the county in the late 20th century. It and the Sloatsburg Historical Society have been working to develop it as part of the 45-acre (18 ha) Eleanor Burlingham Memorial Park, meant primarily for passive recreation. Currently there is the marker at the gateposts and a short walking trail to the dam from there.

== See also ==
- National Register of Historic Places listings in Rockland County, New York
