= Barbara Sloat =

American biologist

- Citizenship: American
- Scientific career
- Fields: Lysosomal enzymes, yeast cellular morphogenesis; recruitment and retention of women in science
- Institutions: University of Michigan

Barbara Sloat is an American biologist, Professor Emeritus at the University of Michigan.

Sloat's research focused on lysosomal enzymes, yeast cellular morphogenesis, and notably, the recruitment and retention of women in science. As part of the latter efforts, she was founding Director of the University of Michigan's Women in Science Program, now known as Women in Science and Engineering. In recognition of her work she received the Sarah Goddard Power Award for "distinguished service, scholarship, and commitment to the betterment of the status of women" at the University of Michigan. She has been a licensed Paramedic in the State of Michigan since 1998.

== Selected research ==
- Adams, A. E., et al. "CDC42 and CDC43, two additional genes involved in budding and the establishment of cell polarity in the yeast Saccharomyces cerevisiae." The Journal of cell biology 111.1 (1990): 131–142.
- Sloat, Barbara F., Alison Adams, and John R. Pringle. "Roles of the CDC24 gene product in cellular morphogenesis during the Saccharomyces cerevisiae cell cycle." The Journal of cell biology 89.3 (1981): 395–405.
- Sloat, Barbara F. "A mutant of yeast defective in cellular morphogenesis." Science 200.4346 (1978): 1171–1173.
- Sloat, Barbara Furin, and John M. Allen. "Soluble and membrane-associated forms of acid phosphatase associated with the lysosomal fraction of rat liver." (1969).
