= John D. Sloat =

Military Governor of California

John Drake Sloat
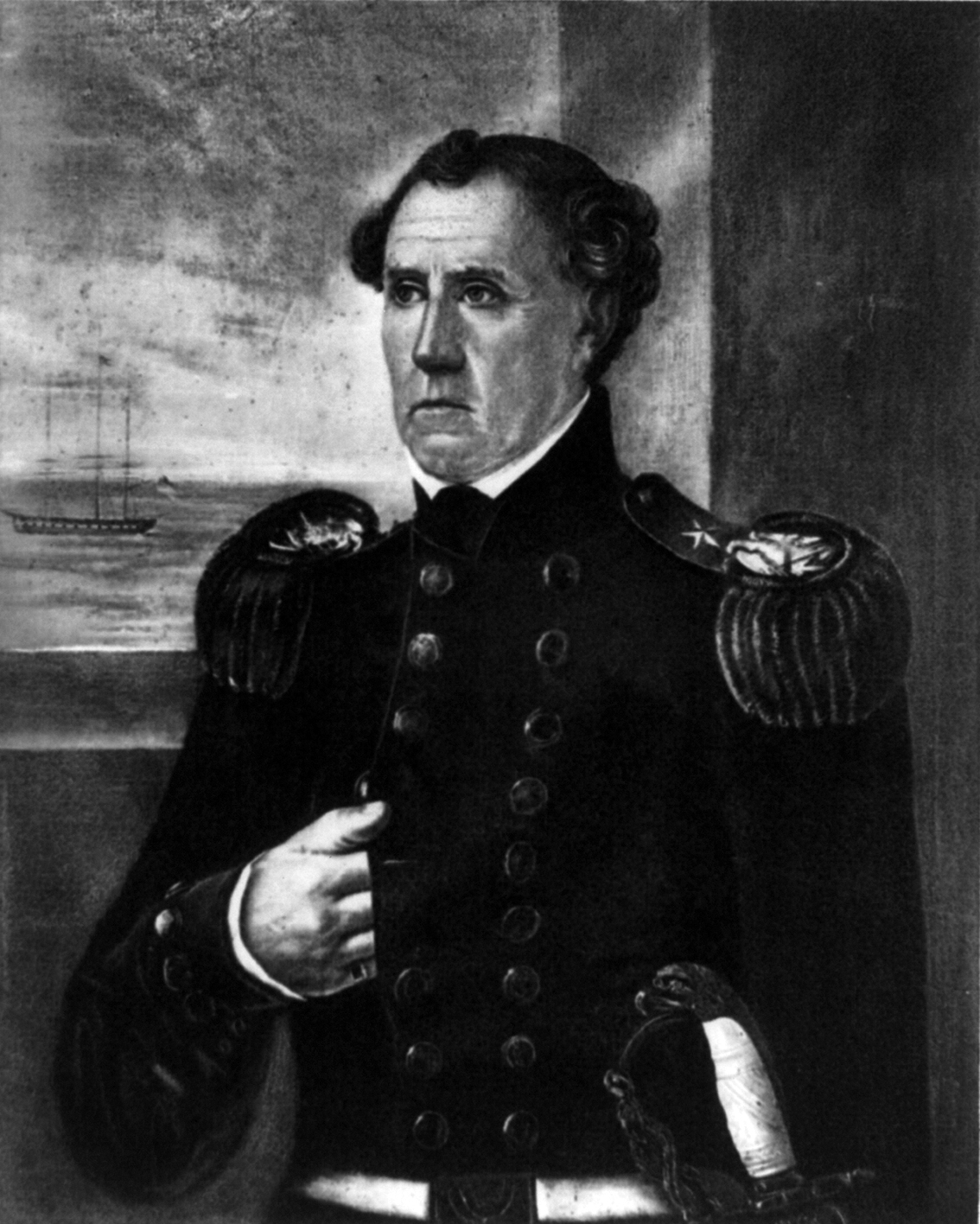

1st Military Governor of California
- In office July 7 – 29, 1846
- Preceded by: Pío Pico (civil governor)
- Succeeded by: Robert F. Stockton

Personal details
- Born: July 26, 1781 Sloatsburg, New York, U.S.
- Died: November 28, 1867 (aged 86) New Brighton, New York, U.S.
- Resting place: Green-Wood Cemetery, New York City
- Awards: Sloat; The Sloat Monument in Monterey was built in his honor. Sloat Blvd in San Francisco.

Military service
- Allegiance: United States
- Branch/service: United States Navy
- Years of service: 1800–1861
- Rank: Rear Admiral
- Unit: United States
- Commands: Grampus; St. Louis; Pacific Squadron
- Battles/wars: War of 1812; Capture of the sloop Anne; Mexican–American War

John Drake Sloat (July 26, 1781 – November 28, 1867) was a commodore in the United States Navy who, in 1846, claimed California for the United States.

== Life ==
He was born at the family home of Sloat House in Sloatsburg, New York, of Dutch ancestry. He was orphaned at an early age, his father, Captain John Sloat, having been mistakenly shot and killed by one of his sentries two months before he was born, and his mother dying a few years later.

Appointed midshipman in the Navy in 1800, he was sailing master of the frigate United States under Commodore Stephen Decatur during the War of 1812, and was promoted to lieutenant for conspicuous gallantry in the capture of the frigate HMS Macedonian. Sloat then commanded the schooner Grampus during which he fought the March 1825 naval campaign against the pirate ship of Roberto Cofresí. He later served on the ships Franklin and Washington, and from 1828 commanded the sloop St. Louis with the rank of master commandant, to which he had been promoted in 1826. He was promoted to captain in 1837, and from 1840 to 1844 was in charge of the Portsmouth Navy Yard.

=== California ===
In 1844 Sloat was appointed to command the Pacific Squadron, and in 1845, as tensions with Mexico grew, he was instructed to land in Alta California and claim it for the United States if war broke out. Receiving a report of fighting on the Texas border while off Mazatlán, he raced north, defeated Mexican forces at the Battle of Monterey, raised the flag over the Customs House at Monterey on July 7, 1846, and issued a proclamation announcing that California was now part of the United States. He was a military Governor of California for only twenty-two days, before handing over the office to Robert F. Stockton.

Later, his poor health forced Sloat to take commands ashore, where he commanded the Norfolk Navy Yard 1847–1851, directed the construction of the Stevens Battery in 1855, and helped plan the Mare Island Navy Yard. He retired with the rank of captain in December 1861, and was promoted to rear admiral on the retired list in July 1866. Sloat was a Freemason, and belonged to Saint Nicholas lodge No. 321 in New York City. He died in New Brighton, New York, and was buried in Brooklyn's Green-Wood Cemetery.

== Legacy ==
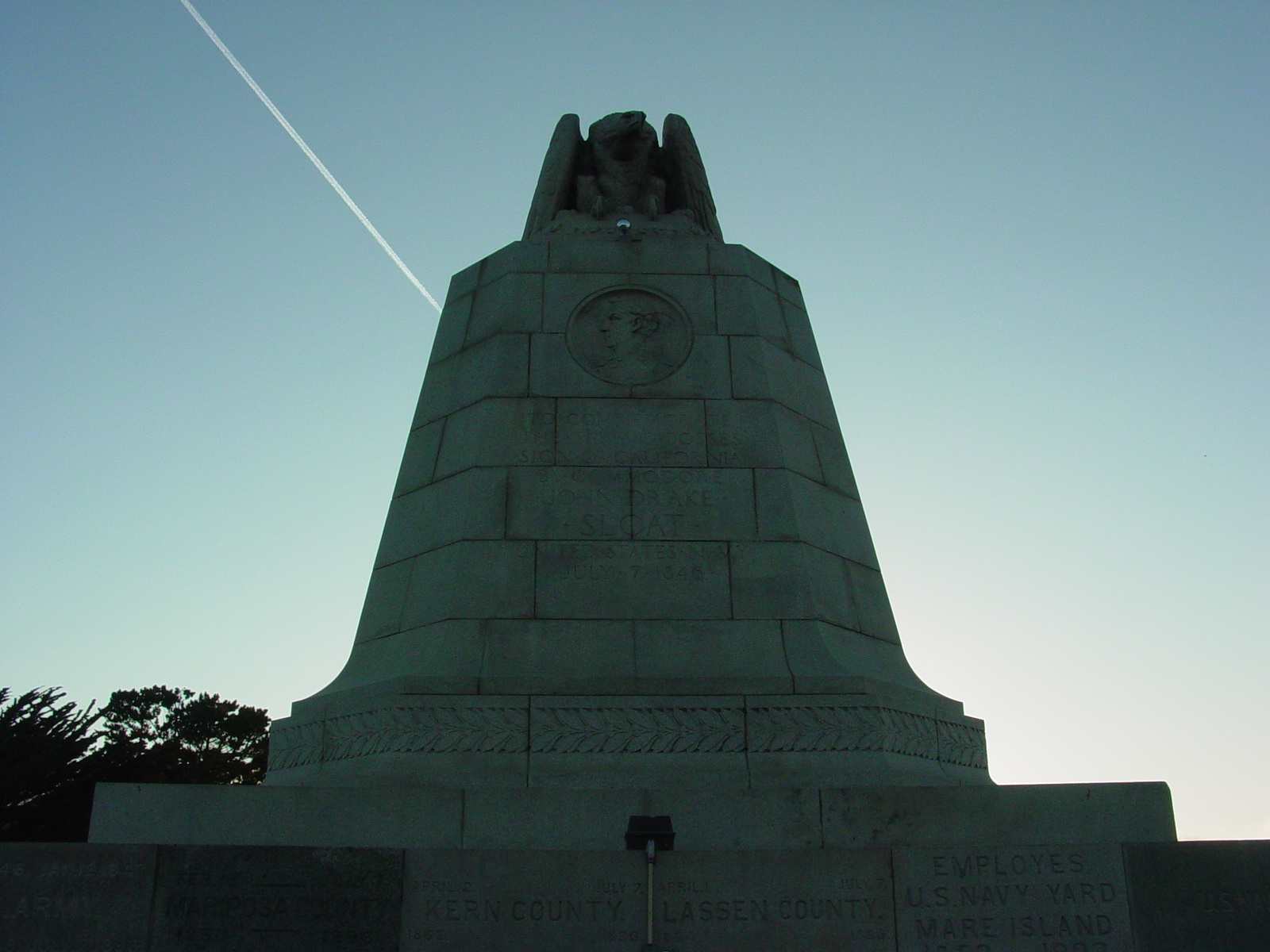
The John D. Sloat monument in Monterey, California.

Two destroyers were named USS Sloat in his honor as well as the World War II Liberty ship, the SS John Drake Sloat.

A memorial window dedicated to him was unveiled at St. Peter's Chapel, Mare Island in 1925. Sloat was on the 1852 board that selected Mare Island to be the site of the first U.S. naval base on the Pacific.

The town, Sloat, California, in Plumas County, California was named for him in 1910.

A major street, Sloat Boulevard, and the Commodore Sloat Elementary School, both in San Francisco, California are named for him.

John Sloat Elementary School located in Sacramento, California is named for him.

Streets located in Monterey, California, East Garrison, California, Sacramento, California, and the Carthay Circle neighborhood of Los Angeles bear his name.

There is a monument erected in his honor on the Presidio of Monterey U.S. Army post.

His hometown of Sloatsburg, New York is named after his grandfather, Stephen Sloat.

== Dates of rank ==
- Midshipman - 12 February 1800
- Sailing Master - 10 January 1812
- Lieutenant - 24 July 1813
- Master Commandant - 21 March 1826
- Captain - 9 February 1837
- Reserved List - 27 September 1855
- Retired List - 21 December 1861
- Commodore on Retired List - 16 July 1862
- Rear Admiral, Retired List - 25 July 1866

== Gallery ==
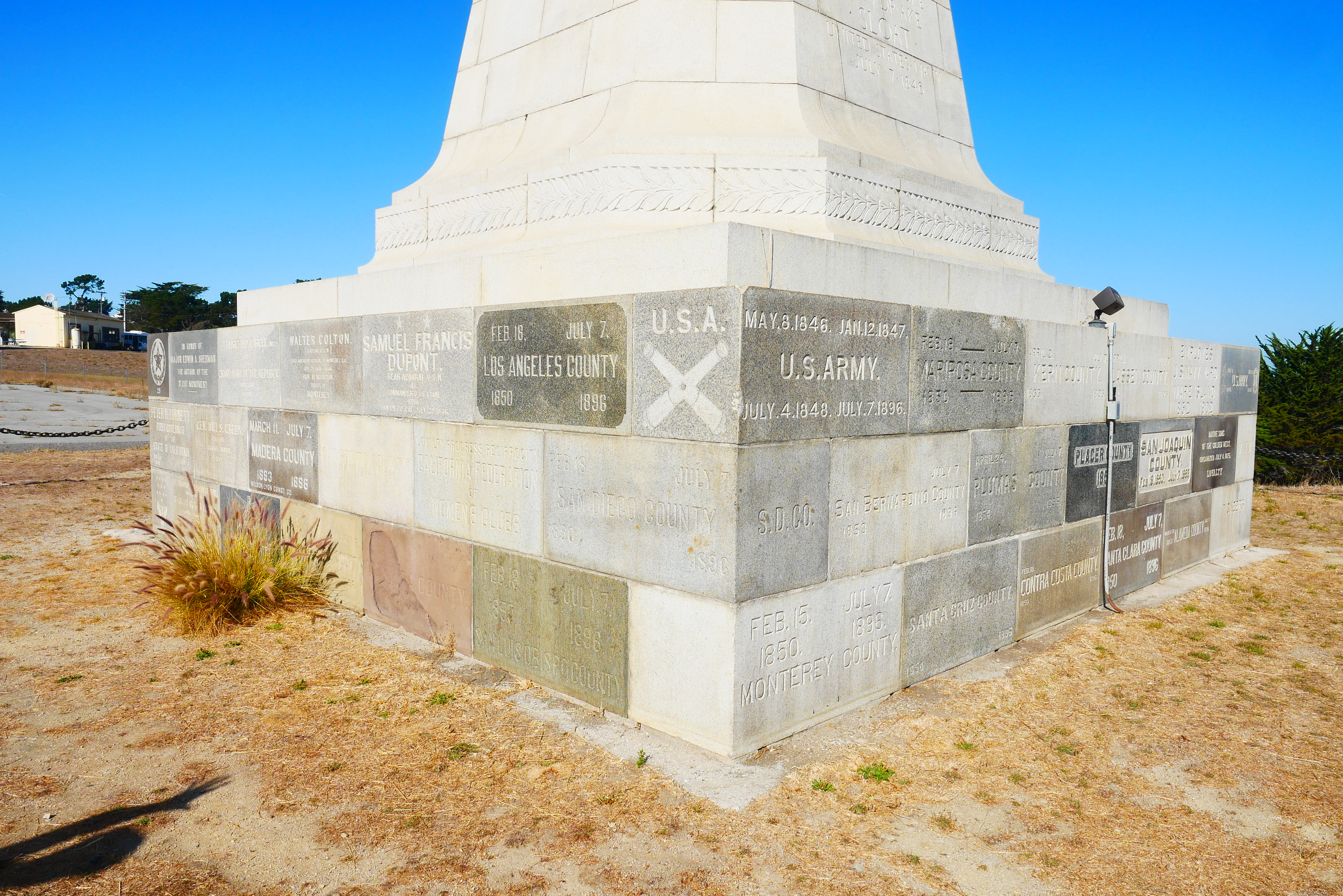
Base of John Sloat memorial

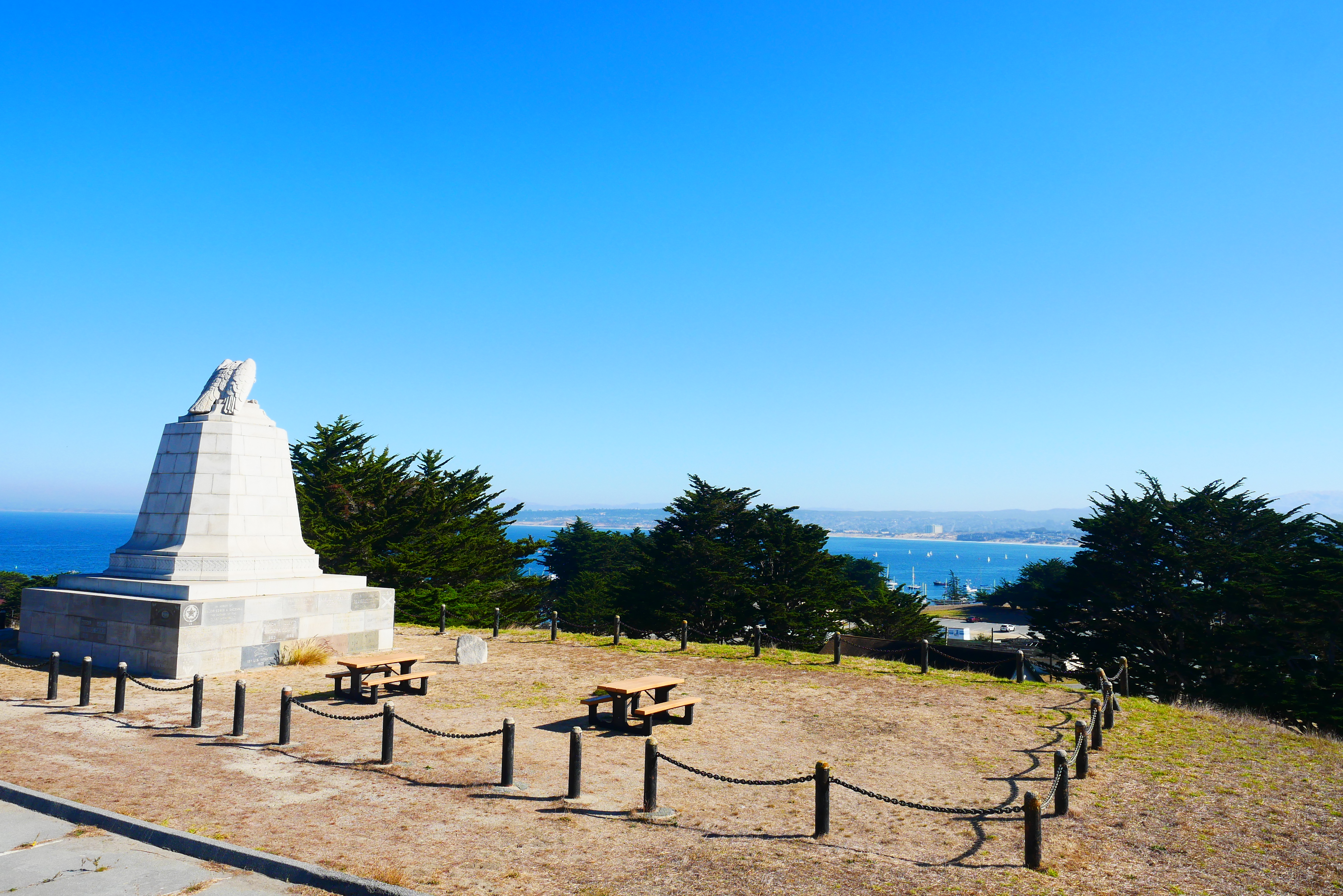
Sloat memorial overlooking Monterey Bay

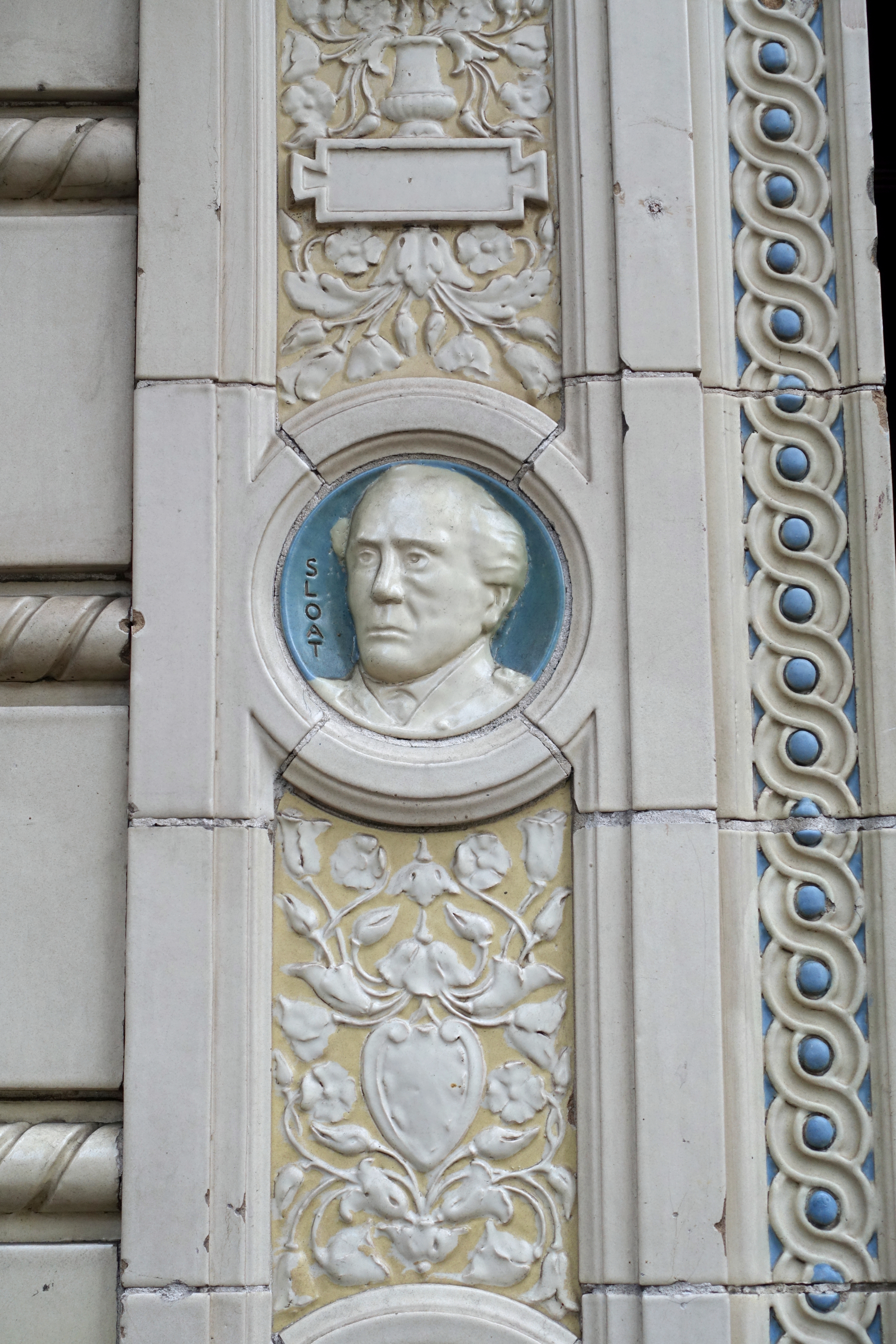
Sloat medallion on Native Sons Building, San Francisco
