= Jacob Sloat House =

Historic house in New York, United States

- U.S. National Register of Historic Places
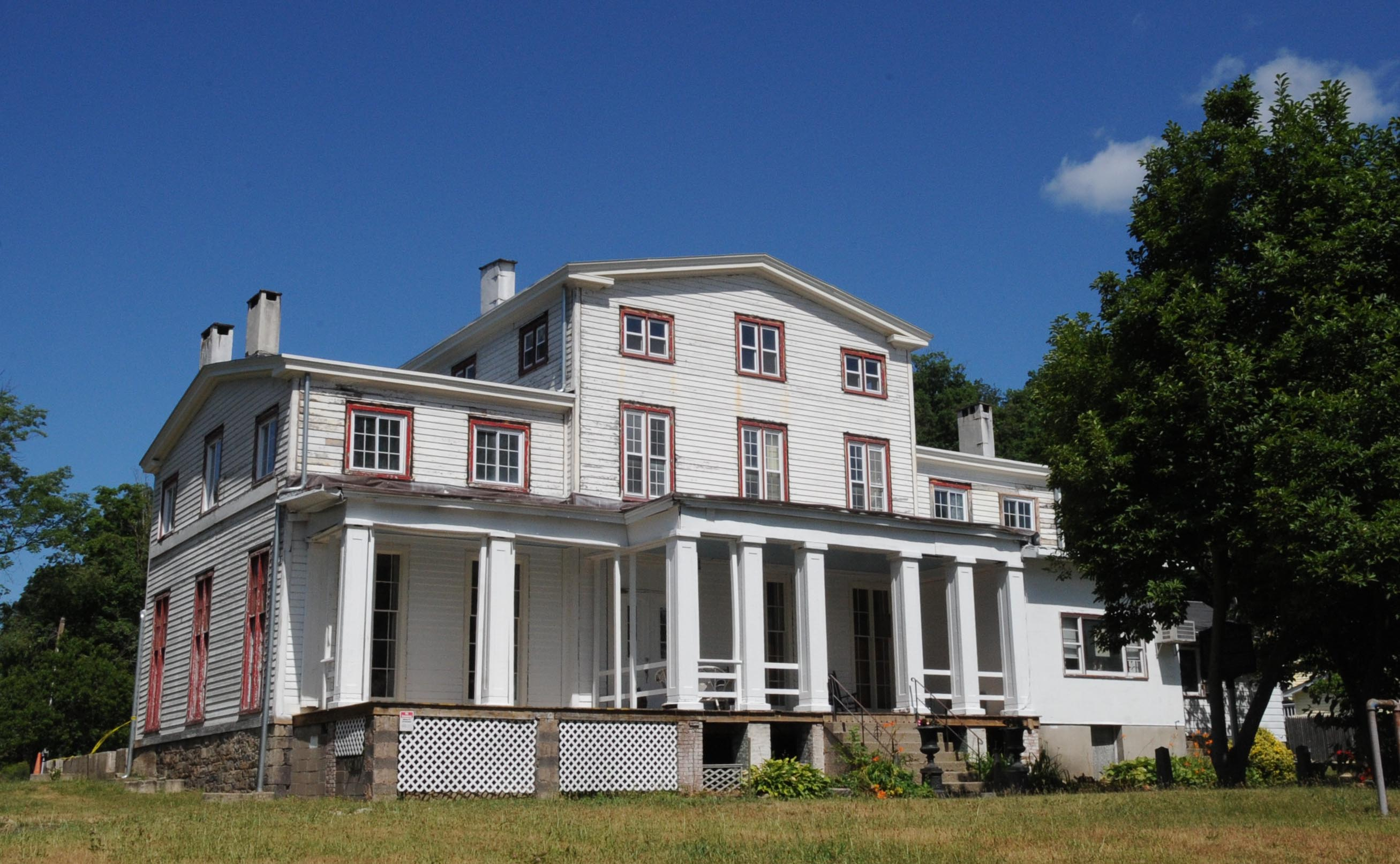
- Location: Sloatsburg, NY
- Nearest city: Paterson, NJ
- Coordinates: 41°09′19″N 74°11′41″W
- Area: 2 acres (0.81 ha)
- Built: 1846-1848
- Architectural style: Greek Revival, Italianate
- NRHP reference No.: 06001144
- Added to NRHP: November 28, 2006

The Jacob Sloat House, originally called Harmony Hall, is located on Liberty Rock Road in Sloatsburg, New York, United States. Built in the late 1840s, it is a wooden house that shows the transition from the waning Greek Revival style to the newer Picturesque and Italianate modes.

It was built late in the life of Jacob Sloat, a descendant of village founder Stephen Sloat who had made a fortune as a textile merchant earlier in the century. He was a close friend of Jasper Cropsey, who historians believe may have helped him design the house. After leaving his family at the beginning of the 20th century, the house passed through a variety of owners and uses, including two restaurants and a home for the elderly. It is currently the property of the Town of Ramapo, which intends to develop it into a historic house museum and cultural center. In 2006 it was listed on the National Register of Historic Places.

== Building ==
The house stands on a two-acre (8,100 m^{2}) lot south of the other houses on the street, accessible by a narrow winding route called Oak Street, atop a gentle rise leading up from the Ramapo River a mile to the east. A few vestiges of the original siting, such as the large lawn, some of the trees, and parts of the former roads to nearby Orange Turnpike (now NY 17) remain. Two large Norway spruce trees screen the front.

It is supported by an ashlar granite foundation, from which it rises three stories in the front. Aluminum siding covers the original pine clapboard. The house is topped by a slightly pitched gabled roof.

Two wings in the rear give the house an asymmetrical L-shaped footprint. A full-length veranda with six antae runs along the first story of the eastern (front) facade; a wooden wheelchair ramp now connects to it as well. The windows are tall and narrow.

Inside, the main block has a central-hall plan, with a large parlor to the south and a smaller dining room to the north, since further partitioned. The original veranda has been enclosed to create additional rooms; one of its antae is still visible. The second floor is more intact, with its central hallway between bedrooms running north–south, perpendicular to its counterpart below. The basement is fully finished, with three large rooms whose function is not clear divided by another central hall.

The on the two main floors is mostly intact from the original construction. All wall plaster, decoration and woodwork remain. Of particular note are the twin fireplaces in the parlor, with veined marble mantels and cast iron grates.

== Aesthetics ==
The Jacob Sloat House, or Harmony Hall as Sloat called it, exhibits a combination of features from the Greek Revival style, then declining in importance for houses, and newer trends like the Picturesque and Italianate styles. The former is more noticeable on the outside; the latter on the inside.

Like a Greek Revival home, Sloat's was built on high ground that overlooked his lands and the source of his wealth, his mills and the river. The lawn and plantings around it, in turn, reflect the contemporary theories of Andrew Jackson Downing, who disliked Greek Revival houses as wasteful and false, advocating instead cottages that looked like comfortable places to live, in harmony with their natural surroundings rather than attempting to dominate them.

The strictly symmetrical fenestration is a hallmark of Greek Revival classicism as is the center-hall plan. The liberal use of ornament and marble on the inside suggest the influence of Italian design.

== History ==
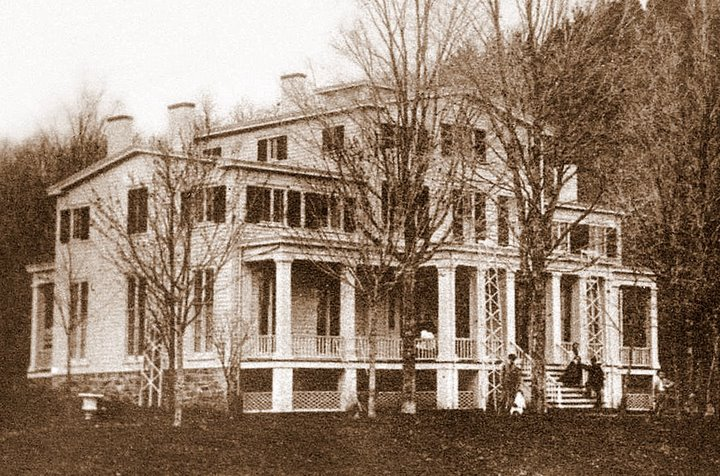
Jacob Sloat House - c1900

Jacob Sloat (1792–1857), a grandson of Stephen Sloat, who first settled the area in 1763, built his mills on the Ramapo in the mid-1810s. During the next decade, he invented the cap spindle and gimlet-pointed wood screw, his family later claimed. These helped his business take off, and the New York and Erie Railroad's route through the area extended his reach to new markets in later decades.

He began building the house in 1846, starting with the foundation. After waiting for it to settle, giving rise to rumors that he was financially strapped, he completed the framing and the rest of the house, in time to move his family in two years later.

There is no architect of record. Sloat, who admired Downing's works and ideas, may have undertaken much of it himself. He may also have been helped by his friend, the Hudson River School painter Jasper Cropsey, who dabbled in architecture. Cropsey frequently traveled through Sloatsburg in the mid-1840s, and visited Sloat frequently. Around 1850 he made an early pencil sketch of the house from the northeast.

The house remained in the Sloat family until the early 20th century. A 1912 postcard of the village shows it being used as the Henry Inn. It later became the Ramapo Inn, a popular local eatery until the mid-1930s. The next decade, it became an Italian restaurant, and in the mid-1950s was once again converted into a boardinghouse, the Martin Home for Women.

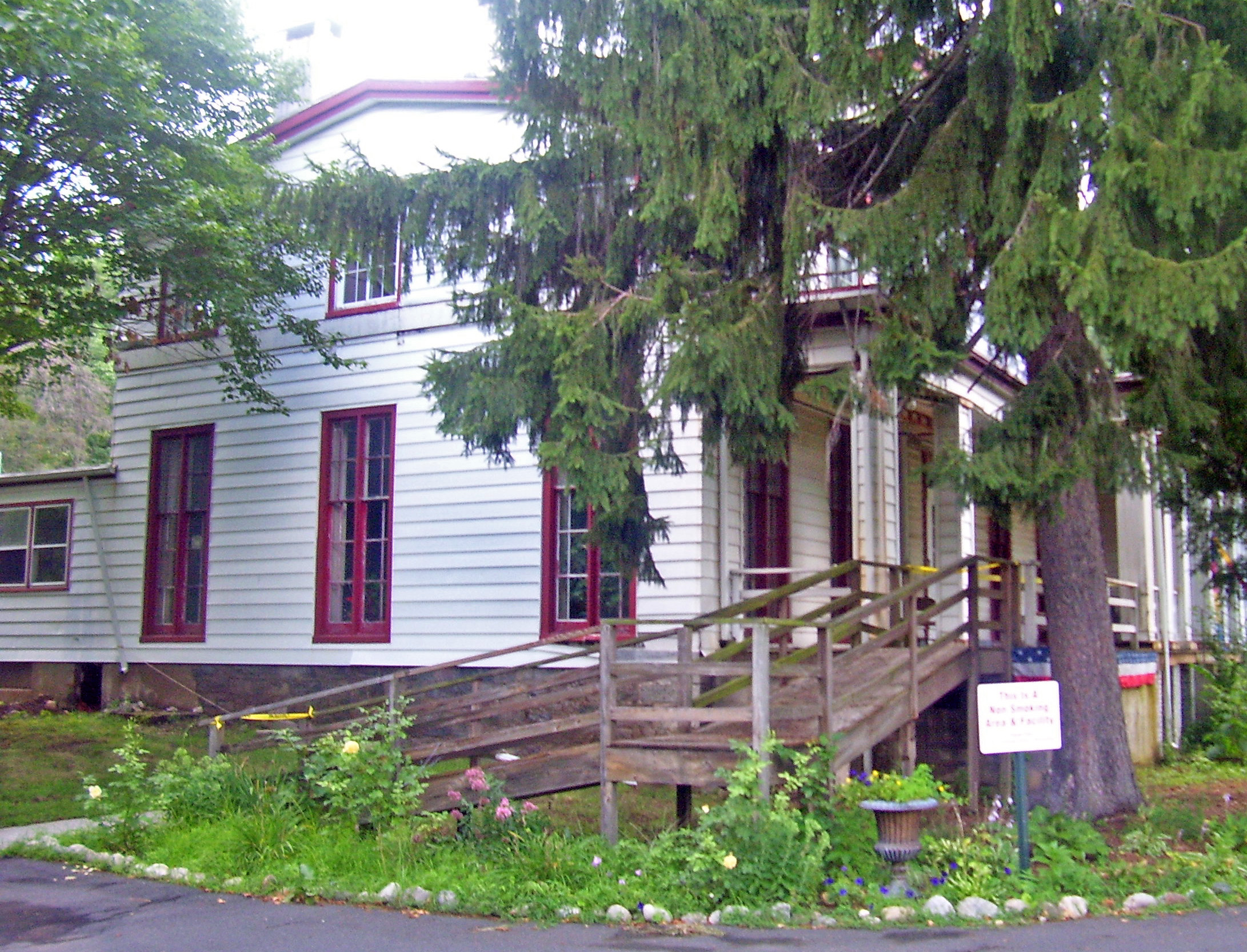
South profile and east (front) elevation, 2008

In the 1980s it was modified slightly into an elder care home that was closed by the state in 2003. The town purchased the abandoned home with the intent of converting it into a local historical museum. In 2007 it received a grant for major restorations that will help recreate the house as it was during the Sloat family's years of ownership.
