= Sloat House =

Historic house in New York, United States

- U.S. National Register of Historic Places
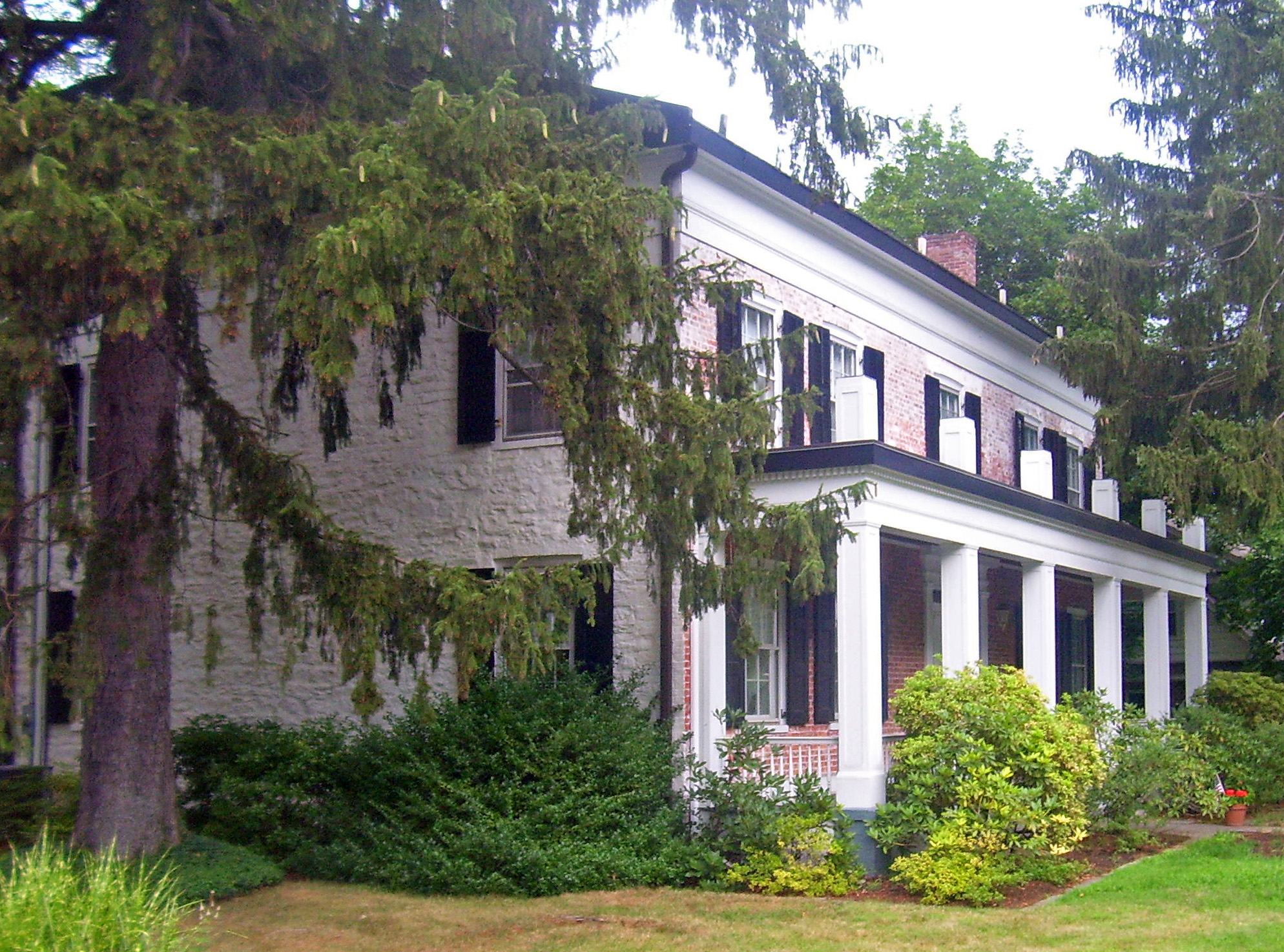
- East (front) elevation and south profile, 2008
- Location: Sloatsburg, NY
- Nearest city: Paterson, NJ
- Coordinates: 41°09′06.07″N 74°11′38″W
- Area: 1.1 acres (4,500 m^{2})
- Built: 1755
- Architectural style: Greek Revival, Federal
- NRHP reference No.: 74001301
- Added to NRHP: 1974

The Sloat House is located at the corner of NY 17 and Sterling Avenue in Sloatsburg, New York, United States. It is a stone house, dating to the mid-18th century, with a frame front addition built in the 1810s.

It was the home for many years of members of the Sloat family, for whom the village is named. George Washington visited it during the Revolutionary War, and John D. Sloat, later the first American Military Governor of California, was born here. It also served as a meeting place for local politicians and officials during the Revolution and some decades afterward. In 1974 it became the first property in the village listed on the National Register of Historic Places.

== Building ==
The house has two blocks, built at different times. The older rear section, the kitchen wing, is one-and-a-half stories high and 22 by 30 feet (6.7 by 9.1 m). It is faced in clapboard, except for the north wall which is rough stone. It has two original Dutch doors, with their hinges. There is also an enclosed porch.

The 34 by 48 feet (10 by 15 m) main wing is two and a half stories, faced in stone with a brick front, both painted white. It has a porch running the full length of all five front bays. The main entrance leads into a ground floor with four large rooms, each with its own original fireplace and wooden mantel. The six chimneys in both wings pierce gabled roofs shingled in asphalt. The house has a full cellar as well.

Three outbuildings remain on the property: a small barn, a large stable and a wellhouse. All three are remnants of the farming operations, and are considered contributing resources to the Register listing.

== History ==
There may have been a house on the site in the late 1730s, when Isaac Van Deursen became the first European settler in the upper Ramapo River valley. The current wing may actually have been this house or part of it, since it is very primitive.

Traditionally, histories of the area have dated the house's original wing to 1755, when Stephen Sloat received the land as a wedding gift from his father-in-law. An early frame front was probably on the front of the house through the Revolution, which affected both the house and the Sloat family.

In 1774, a local meeting at the house, the General Meeting of Committees of Orange County, chose two delegates, Henry Wisner and John Haring, to the Provincial Convention of the First Continental Congress. George Washington had his headquarters at the house on June 6, 1779, and likely made other visits during the Revolutionary War.

Tragedy struck the Sloats in 1781 when their son John, a captain in the local militia, was accidentally shot and killed in the doorway by one of the sentries his father had hired. The marks left in the doorway by the shots remain. The infant son Sloat left behind grew up to be John D. Sloat, a celebrated U.S. Navy commodore and the first governor of California.

Isaac Sloat, John's brother, later built the front of the house around 1813–14. He ran it as a public house, also hosting annual meetings of town supervisors and judges from Orange and Rockland counties through 1821. His son Stephen ran the house as an inn along the Orange Turnpike, renowned for its food but serving no alcoholic beverages. At this point the large barn was also built. Stephen's brother Jacob developed a mill along the creek and later built his own house in the village.

In 1905 the Sloat descendants sold the house to Benjamin Moffatt Jr., an English immigrant who later became president of the nearby Sterling iron works. It remained in the Moffatt family throughout the 20th century and is still a private residence.

== See also ==
- List of Washington's Headquarters during the Revolutionary War
- National Register of Historic Places listings in Rockland County, New York
