= Sloatsburg, New York =

Village in Ramapo, New York, US

- Village
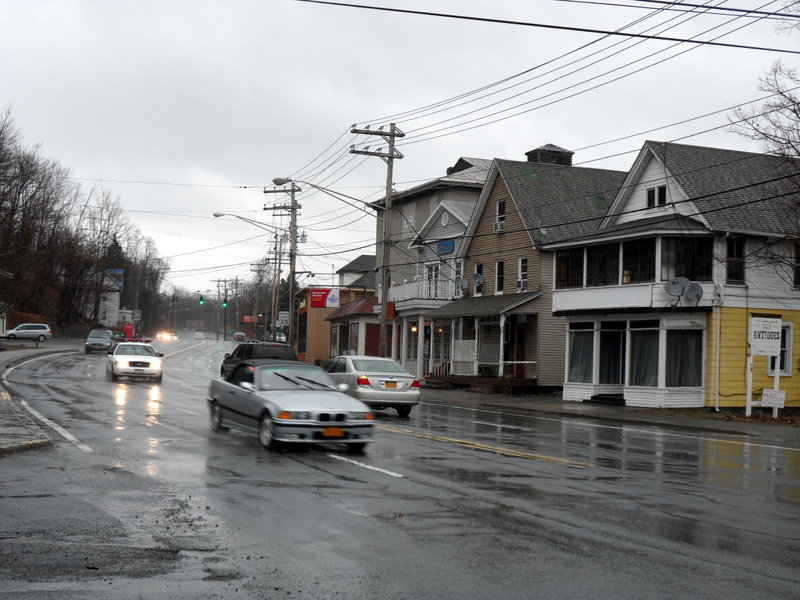
- Route 17 in Sloatsburg

- Location in Rockland County and the state of New York.
- Coordinates: 41°9′43″N 74°11′16″W
- Country: United States
- State: New York
- County: Rockland
- Town: Ramapo
- Incorporated: October 7, 1929

Government
  - Mayor: Darrell Frasier
  - Trustees: Marc Bitterman, John M. Bonkoski, Thomas Donnelly, and Susan McDonagh.

Area
  - Total: 2.54 sq mi (6.57 km^{2})
  - Land: 2.50 sq mi (6.47 km^{2})
  - Water: 0.039 sq mi (0.10 km^{2})
- Elevation: 344 ft (105 m)

Population (2020)
  - Total: 3,036
  - Density: 1,215.0/sq mi (469.11/km^{2})
- Time zone: UTC−5 (EST)
  - Summer (DST): UTC−4 (EDT)
- ZIP Code: 10974
- Area code: 845
- FIPS code: 36-67708
- GNIS feature ID: 0965432
- Website: https://sloatsburgny.gov/

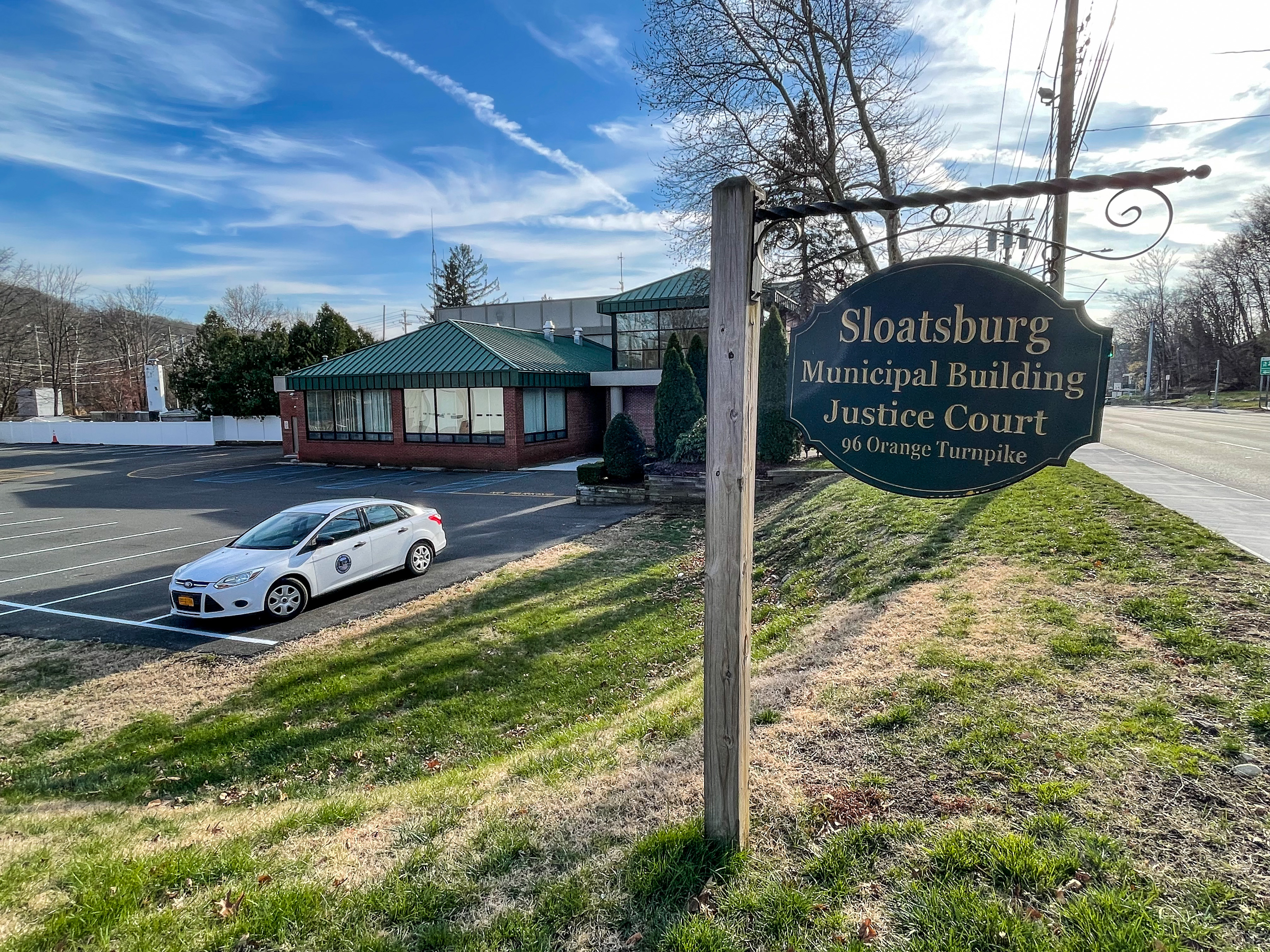
Sloatsburg Municipal Building

Sloatsburg is a village in the town of Ramapo in Rockland County, New York, United States. Located east of Orange County, it is at the southern entrance to Harriman State Park. The population was 3,036 at the 2020 census. The village is named after Stephen Sloat, an early European landowner.

== History ==
The land that would become the village of Sloatsburg was part of the hunting grounds of the Minsi band of the Leni Lenape Indians, whose people occupied much of the mid-Atlantic area at the time of European encounter. The area was the site of a major Indian path through the Ramapo Mountains. The path was later improved as the New York to Albany road and, in 1800, the Orange Turnpike. It remains an important thoroughfare today as the New York State Thruway, New York State Route 17 and the Norfolk Southern Railway line run along its route.

Wynant Van Gelder, an ethnic Dutch colonist, purchased the area from the Minsi in 1738. In 1747, he gave it to his father-in-law, Isaac Van Deusen. When his daughter Marritge Van Deusen married Stephen Sloat, Isaac gave the couple the land in 1763. They built a stone house on the property and operated a tavern, which was a regular stop on the New York-to-Albany stage route. During the American Revolution, the Sloat House was headquarters for American troops stationed in the Ramapo Pass. The house is a private residence, listed on the National Register of Historic Places listings in Rockland County, New York (NRHP). There he established Sloat's Tavern, which became a regular stop on the New York to Albany stage route.

Sloatsburg, originally Pothat, was named after the Sloat family. During the American Revolutionary War, the stage route became an important military route and the Ramapo pass an important strategic point, occupied by American troops throughout the war. George Washington traveled through the area several times and stayed in Sloat's Tavern at least once, on June 6, 1779.

After the war, the Sloats added a tannery and a cotton mill. One of the sons, Jacob Sloat, was a gifted mechanic. He opened a mill in 1815 for making cotton cloth, importing cotton from the South. He successfully turned to making exclusively cotton twine after patenting a process for dressing it in 1840. At peak, he produced around 8,000 pounds (3,600 kg) of twine per week. The family operated the mill until the Civil War, when it close temporarily for lack of cotton. It was one of numerous mills near New York City that produced cotton textiles; in 1860 half the exports from New York were cotton products. The mill ceased operations in 1878, after the South developed its own textile mills.

In the early 19th century, Abram Dater built an iron forge on the Ramapo River, and a grist mill and a saw mill soon followed. Between 1836 and 1841, the Erie Railroad built a line through Sloatsburg, resulting in a major increase in the population and prosperity of the village. After the Civil War, the village prospered until the great flood of 1903 destroyed most of the factories in the town. First built close to the river for its water power, many were never rebuilt.

During Prohibition, Sloatsburg's rural setting and proximity to New York City made it an attractive location for stills and bootlegging; the gangsters running the operations also occasionally used the local woods to dispose of bodies of those killed in the course of business. In 1929, with a population of 1,559, Sloatsburg was incorporated as a village, with David Henion elected as the first mayor.

The rise of the automobile early in the 20th century had a profound impact on the area. Prior to construction of the New York State Thruway and the Palisades Parkway in the 1950s, Sloatsburg was cut in half by automobile traffic, which could back up for miles in the 1940s and 1950s on the Orange Turnpike. Over the Fourth of July weekend in 1952, the backup extended for 8 miles (13 km).

== Geography ==
According to the United States Census Bureau, the village has a total area of 2.5 square miles (6.5 km^{2}), of which 2.5 square miles (6.4 km^{2}) is land and 0.04 square miles (0.1 km^{2}), or 1.54%, is water.

The western part of the village borders Orange County.

== Demographics ==
Historical population
| Census | Pop. | Note | %± |
|---|---|---|---|
| 1930 | 1,623 | | — |
| 1940 | 1,771 | | 9.1% |
| 1950 | 2,018 | | 13.9% |
| 1960 | 2,565 | | 27.1% |
| 1970 | 3,134 | | 22.2% |
| 1980 | 3,154 | | 0.6% |
| 1990 | 3,035 | | −3.8% |
| 2000 | 3,117 | | 2.7% |
| 2010 | 3,039 | | −2.5% |
| 2020 | 3,036 | | −0.1% |
U.S. Decennial Census

=== 2020 census ===
As of the 2020 census, Sloatsburg had a population of 3,036. The median age was 41.2 years. 21.5% of residents were under the age of 18 and 14.7% of residents were 65 years of age or older. For every 100 females there were 99.1 males, and for every 100 females age 18 and over there were 93.7 males age 18 and over.

97.7% of residents lived in urban areas, while 2.3% lived in rural areas.

There were 1,034 households in Sloatsburg, of which 37.7% had children under the age of 18 living in them. Of all households, 59.6% were married-couple households, 14.2% were households with a male householder and no spouse or partner present, and 19.3% were households with a female householder and no spouse or partner present. About 17.7% of all households were made up of individuals and 7.7% had someone living alone who was 65 years of age or older.

There were 1,095 housing units, of which 5.6% were vacant. The homeowner vacancy rate was 0.7% and the rental vacancy rate was 7.3%.

Racial composition as of the 2020 census
| Race | Number | Percent |
|---|---|---|
| White | 2,195 | 72.3% |
| Black or African American | 150 | 4.9% |
| American Indian and Alaska Native | 16 | 0.5% |
| Asian | 87 | 2.9% |
| Native Hawaiian and Other Pacific Islander | 1 | 0.0% |
| Some other race | 339 | 11.2% |
| Two or more races | 248 | 8.2% |
| Hispanic or Latino (of any race) | 567 | 18.7% |

=== 2000 census ===
As of the census of 2000, there were 3,117 people, 1,046 households, and 826 families residing in the village. The population density was 1,162.0 inhabitants per square mile (448.7/km^{2}). There were 1,078 housing units at an average density of 401.9 per square mile (155.2/km^{2}). The racial makeup of the village was 90.95% White, 3.53% African American, 0.45% Native American, 2.50% Asian, 0.10% Pacific Islander, 0.93% from other races, and 1.54% from two or more races. Hispanic or Latino of any race were 5.58% of the population.

There were 1,046 households, out of which 38.5% had children under the age of 18 living with them, 63.6% were married couples living together, 10.4% had a female householder with no husband present, and 21.0% were non-families. Of all households, 15.9% were made up of individuals, and 5.7% had someone living alone who was 65 years of age or older. The average household size was 2.91 and the average family size was 3.27.

In the village, the population was spread out, with 26.1% under the age of 18, 7.0% from 18 to 24, 31.1% from 25 to 44, 24.2% from 45 to 64, and 11.6% who were 65 years of age or older. The median age was 37 years. For every 100 females, there were 99.6 males. For every 100 females age 18 and over, there were 93.3 males.

The median income for a household in the village was $70,721, and the median income for a family was $78,529. Males had a median income of $51,549 versus $39,464 for females. The per capita income for the village was $27,180. About 0.8% of families and 3.0% of the population were below the poverty line, including 1.5% of those under age 18 and 3.4% of those age 65 or over.

== Arts and culture ==
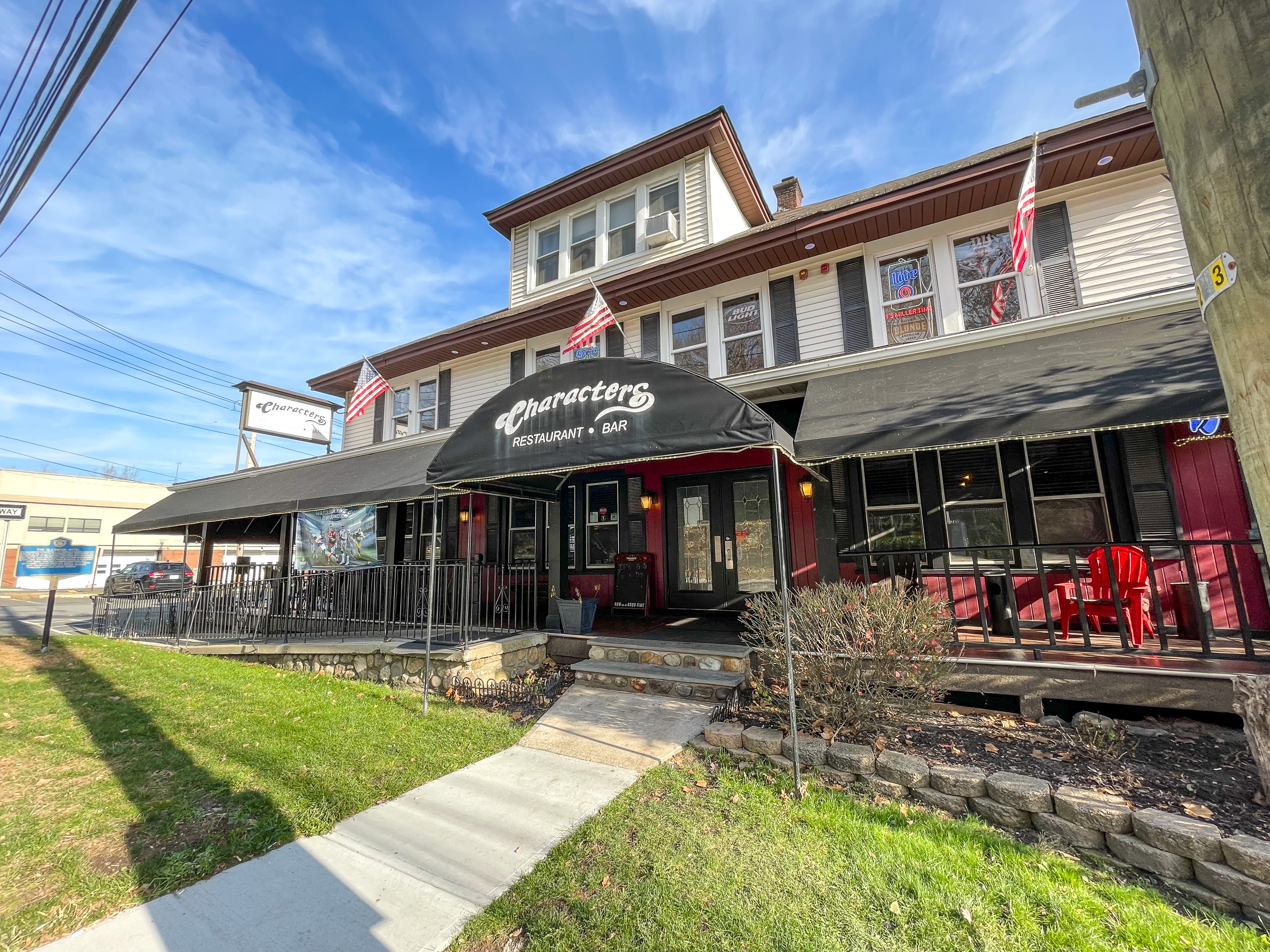
Former Glenwood Hotel

Five properties in Sloatsburg are listed on the NHRP. Historical sites and sites of interest include:

- The Glenwood Hotel, established in 1908. The upper floors operated as a boarding house for workers in the mills of Sloatsburg until 1950.
- Old Sloatsburg Cemetery (NHRP). The earliest burial was Private John Sloat, 1781, during the Revolutionary War. It is a settlement-era burial ground associated with the development of Sloatsburg, including the Sloat Family Burial Ground.
- Sloatsburg Historical Society, which includes a display of Lenape and other Native American artifacts.
- Sloatsburg Public Library, which includes exhibits of prehistoric artifacts excavated from the Spring House Rock Shelter in Sloatsburg. Library building originally housed the St. Francis Episcopal Church, itself once a mission chapel of St. Mary's-in-Tuxedo Episcopal Church.
- Sloat House (NHRP) and Inn, a stone house dating to the mid-18th century. It served as a meeting place for local politicians and officials during the Revolution, and was home to Sloat family members for many years.
- Sloat's Dam and Mill Pond (NHRP). Only remaining dam on this stretch of the Ramapo River, originally built by Isaac Sloat in 1792.
- Jacob Sloat House (NHRP), also called Harmony Hall, a 1848 mansion.

== Education ==
Sloatsburg lies within the Suffern Central School District. Sloatsburg Elementary School serves the village, students in grades 6-8 are zoned to Suffern Middle School, and older students are zoned to Suffern High School.

== Infrastructure ==
=== Transportation ===
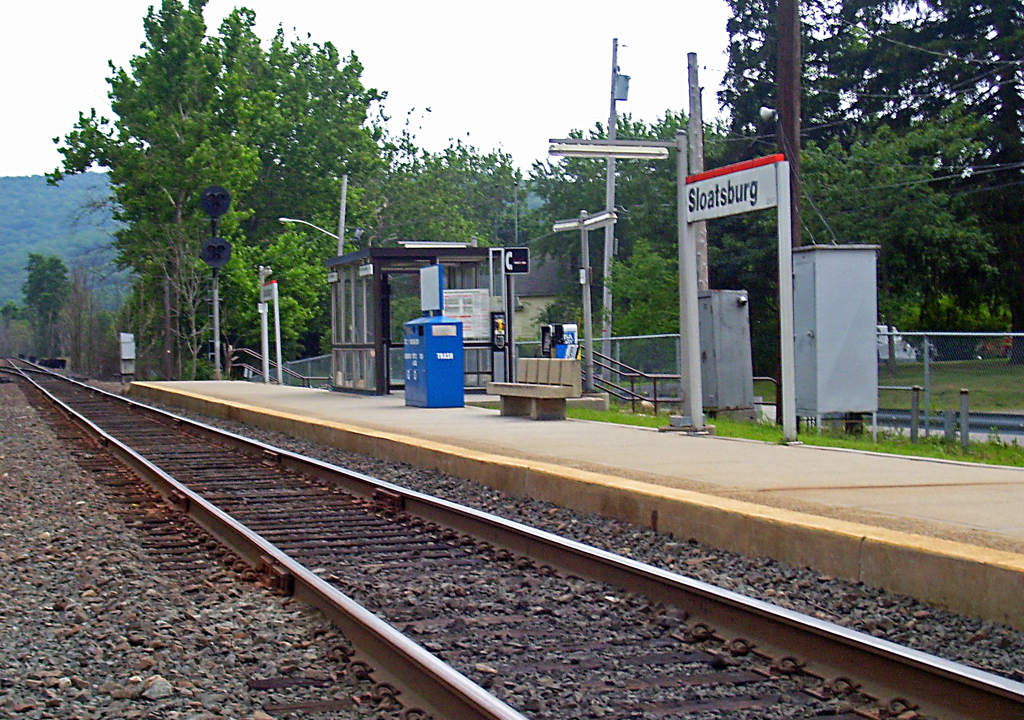
Sloatsburg Metro-North railroad station

Sloatsburg station provides Metro-North train service on the Port Jervis Line to Hoboken - where connecting PATH train service is available to New York and Jersey City - and to Secaucus, the connecting point to New York Penn Station and points in New Jersey. In the opposite direction, the line goes to Port Jervis. Sloatsburg is the western terminus for Transport of Rockland's bus line number 93.

New York State Route 17 travels through Sloatsburg as Orange Turnpike. Interstate 87, the New York State Thruway, passes through Sloatsburg; while there is no direct access from the Thruway to other roads in Sloatsburg, exit 15A is signed for Sloatsburg. Seven Lakes Drive through Harriman State Park has its southern terminus in Sloatsburg.

== Notable people ==
- John Drake Sloat, (July 6, 1781 – November 28, 1867) was a commodore in the United States Navy who, in 1846, claimed California for the United States and became the 1st Military Governor of California.
- Robert H. Gittins, former US Congressman
- Scott Wright, professional wrestler and bodybuilder, known as "Scotty Charisma".

== General sources ==
- Bartlett, Ted, Historic Structure Report for Harmony Hall/Jacob Sloat House, Crawford & Stearns Architects and Preservation Planners, 2008.
- Kuykendall, Eugene L., Historic Sloatsburg, 1738-1998: The Way It Was, Is and Can Be, Sloatsburg Historical Society, 1998.
