= Port Jervis station (Erie Railroad) =

Port Jervis
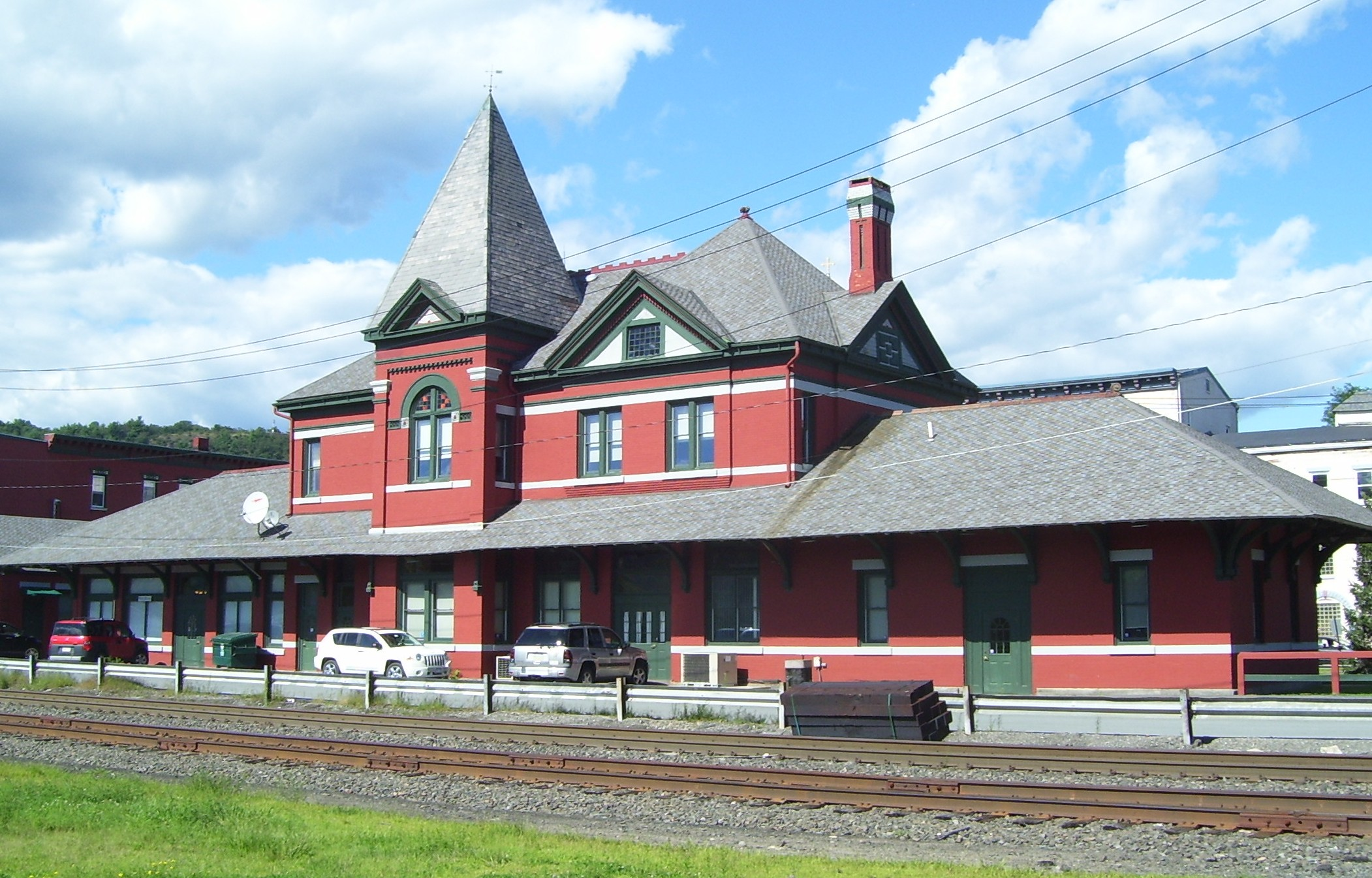
- Port Jervis station trackside in August 2011.

General information
- Location: 13-19 Jersey Avenue, Port Jervis, New York 12771
- Line: Main Line
- Platforms: 1 side platform

Other information
- Station code: 2677

History
- Opened: December 31, 1847
- Closed: November 17, 1974
- Rebuilt: 1850; July 8, 1889; February 6, 1892

Former services
Preceding station	Erie Railroad	Following station
Sparrowbush toward Chicago	Main Line	Graham toward Jersey City
- Erie Railroad Station
- U.S. National Register of Historic Places
- Location within New York Location within the United States
- Coordinates: 41°22′20″N 74°41′30″W
- Built: 1892
- Architect: Grattan & Jennings
- Architectural style: Queen Anne
- NRHP reference No.: 80002739
- Added to NRHP: April 11, 1980
Location

Port Jervis station is a defunct commuter railroad station in the eponymous city of Port Jervis, Orange County, New York. Located at Jersey Avenue in Port Jervis, the station serviced trains of the Erie Railroad on its main line and its successor, the Erie Lackawanna Railroad. Port Jervis served as the de facto northern termius of service on the New York Division of the main line, which continued into Sparrowbush before becoming the Delaware Division. Port Jervis station consisted of a single low-level side platform next to a Queen Anne style station depot built in 1892.

Railroad service began on December 31, 1847 when the first train of the New York and Lake Erie Railroad arrived at 11:45 p.m. from Piermont, New York. The railroad opened its first station depot at Port Jervis in 1850 at the grade crossing of Pike Street (U.S. Route 6 and U.S. Route 209). This was replaced by a new station in 1889 on Jersey Avenue, but the depot burned on December 26, 1890 after issues with the electrical wiring. The Erie Railroad replaced the burned depot with the current structure, designed by architects Grattan and Jennings, which opened on February 6, 1892. The railroad served the growth of Port Jervis, with numerous hotels and factories converging on the city with the railroad. The railroad also maintained a large amount of local workers between Port Jervis and nearby Matamoras, Pennsylvania, helping at the shops and roundhouse.

With the merger of the Erie Railroad and the Delaware, Lackawanna and Western Railroad on October 17, 1960, the benefit of Port Jervis as a yard weakened. The Erie Lackawanna Railroad closed the station depot at Port Jervis on November 17, 1974. The station depot was placed on the National Register of Historic Places on April 11, 1980.

== See also ==
- Middletown station (Erie Railroad)

== Bibliography ==
- Osterberg, Matthew (2002). Images of America: Port Jervis. Charleston, South Carolina: Arcadia Publishing. ISBN 9780738509006.
