= USS Sloat =

USS Sloat may refer to the following ships of the United States Navy:

- USS Sloat (DD-316), a destroyer commissioned in 1920 and decommissioned in 1930
- USS Sloat (DE-245), a destroyer escort commissioned in 1943 and decommissioned in 1947
