= Port Jervis station =

Metro-North Railroad station in New York

Port Jervis
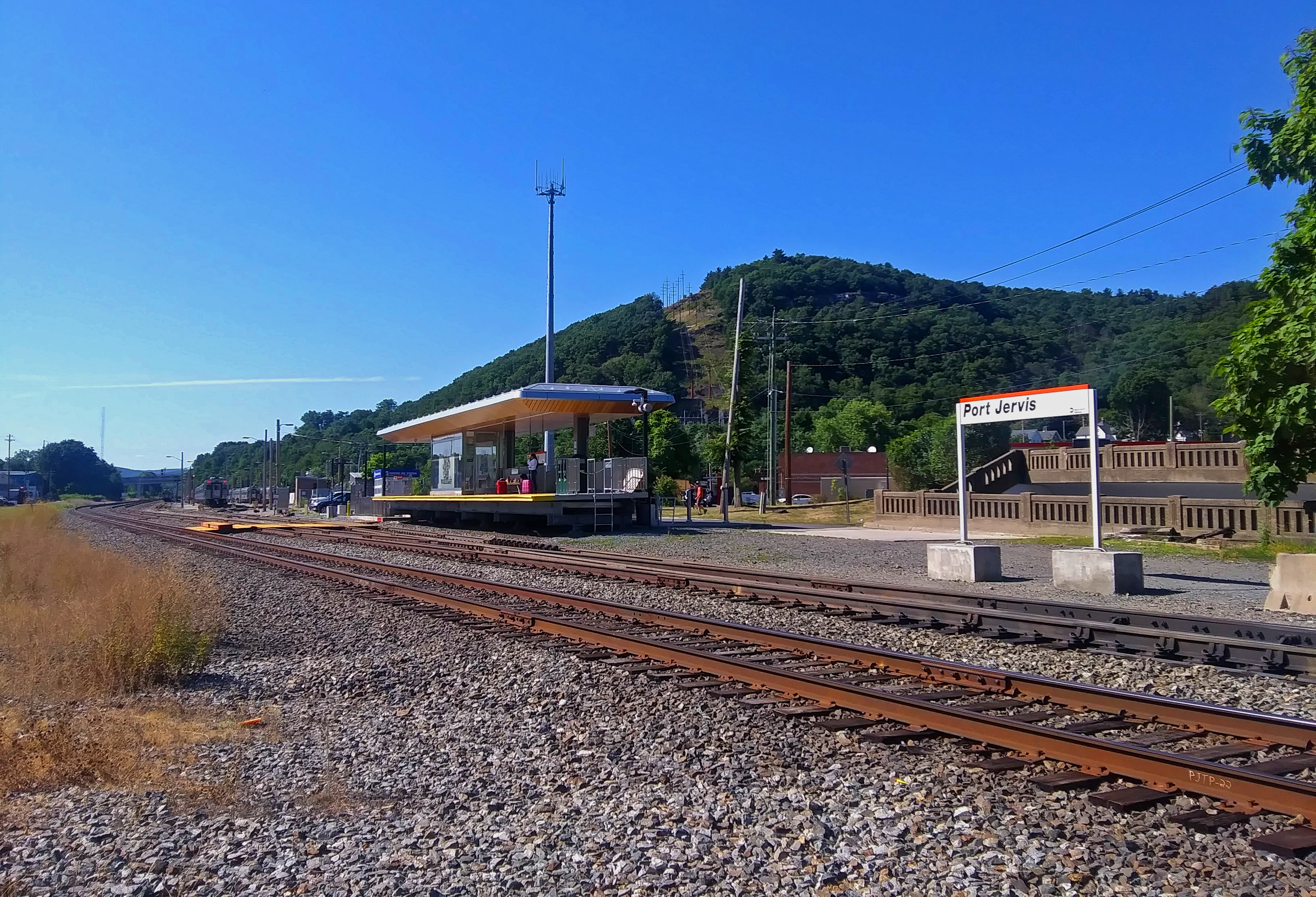
- New station structure with canopy and elevated platform in 2022

General information
- Location: 100 Pike Street; 198 Front Street; Port Jervis, New York
- Coordinates: 41°22′29″N 74°41′40″W
- Owner: Metro-North Railroad
- Line: NS Southern Tier Line
- Platforms: 1 side platform
- Tracks: 3

Construction
- Parking: 110 spaces
- Accessible: Yes

Other information
- Station code: 2677 (Erie Railroad)

Passengers
- 2006: 170

Services
Preceding station	Metro-North Railroad	Following station
Terminus	Port Jervis Line	Otisville toward Hoboken
Location

Port Jervis station is an active commuter railroad station in the city of Port Jervis, Orange County, New York. Located north of Pike Street (U.S. Route 6 and U.S. Route 209), the station serves as the western terminus of the eponymous Port Jervis Line of Metro-North Railroad. All service is operated by NJ Transit under contract from Metro-North Railroad, running southeast to Hoboken Terminal in Hoboken, New Jersey on the shores of the Hudson River. The station is located at the edge of Port Jervis Yard, which currently services all trains going along the line. Port Jervis station contains a single high-level side platform that is handicap accessible.

The current Port Jervis station sits on the former Erie Railroad main line and next to its former turntable. It replaced the former Erie station, which closed on November 17, 1974. The current version was opened on August 10, 2021.

== Station layout ==
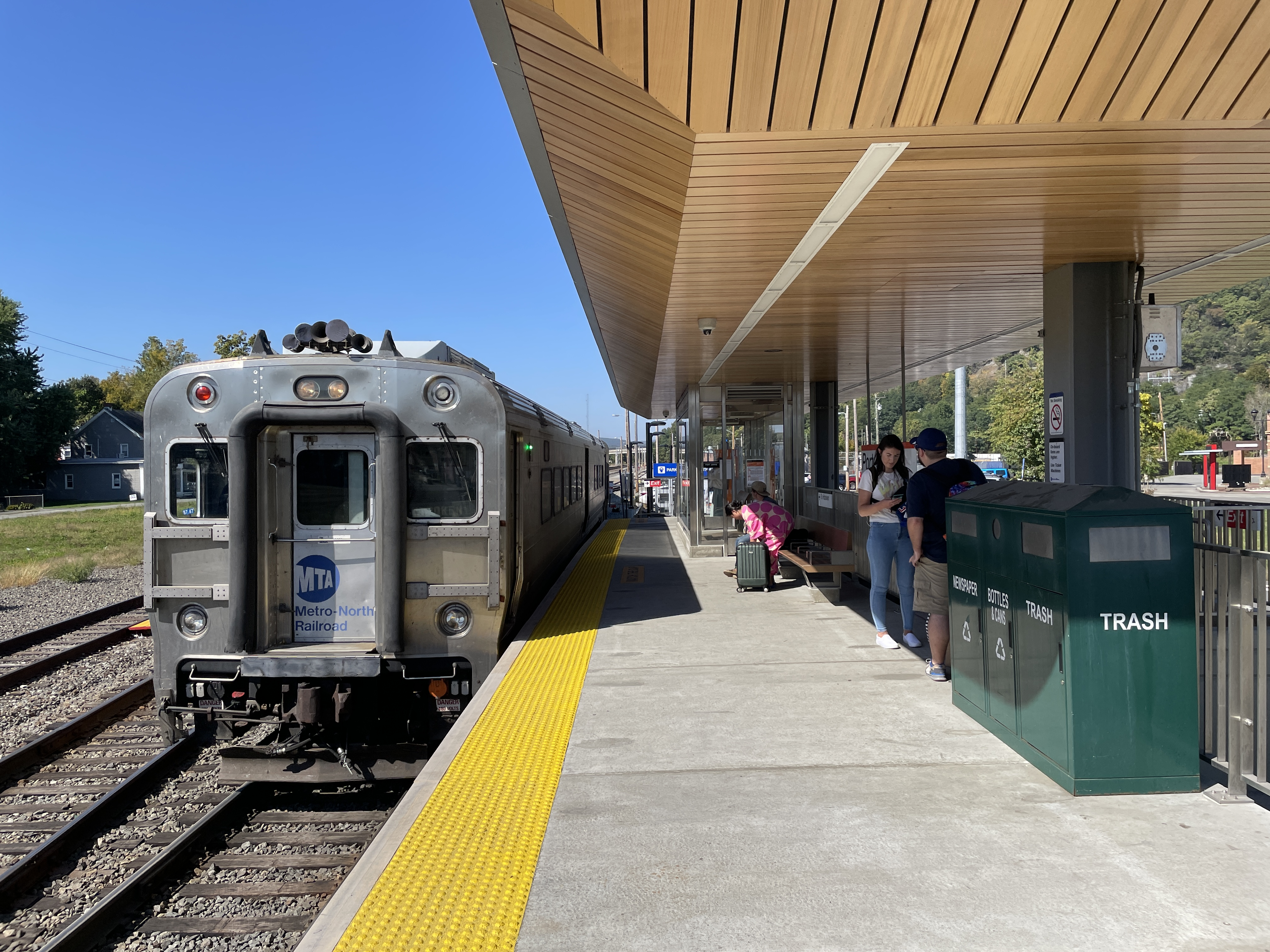
A Hoboken-bound train at Port Jervis station

The station consists of a short concrete platform, a shelter, ticket machine, and a posted schedule. There are 92 parking spaces. Renovations to the station were completed and a high level platform was built and opened on August 10, 2021, with a ribbon cutting ceremony held on October 4.

The vicinity of the station contains a former Erie Railroad yard. The tracks continue upriver, but only carry freight as the Southern Tier Line. Various features of the once extensive facilities that existed here when it was a division point on the Erie can be seen, including a still-working turntable.

The station has two tracks and a high-level side platform with a pathway connecting the platform to the bypass tracks.

== Erie Depot ==
A short distance down the tracks from the station is the Erie Depot, which served as the city's passenger station for much of the 20th century. Built by the Erie Railroad in 1892, when passenger service continued on to Binghamton, it remained in service through the mid-1970s. In 1982 it was redeveloped, and today, it houses medical offices and some small shops.
