= List of WFMU hosts =

A List of WFMU hosts on the listener-supported, independent community radio station, licensed to East Orange, New Jersey. Since 1998, it has been headquartered in Jersey City, New Jersey.

== List of notable hosts ==
Hosts and DJs – past and present – who have had programs on WFMU.

- Daniel Blumin, host of the self-titled show. Former DJ on WNYU-FM (New York University's radio station) "New Afternoon Show" from 1996 to 2006.
- Andy Breckman, film and TV comedy writer. Creator of the USA Network TV series Monk as well as a former writer for Late Night with David Letterman and Saturday Night Live.
- Sheila Burgel, host of "Sophisticated Boom Boom" from 2015 to 2022, music writer who has produced and provided liner notes for box sets and compilations focused on women in music, for Rhino Records, Ace (UK), Big Beat and other labels.
- Laura Cantrell, host of "The Radio Thrift Shop" from 1993 to 2009, recording artist and program hostess on SiriusXM's Beatles Channel.
- Bronwyn C. (b. Bronwyn Carlton), comic-book writer (Catwoman, The Big Book of Death, The Books of Faerie).
- Andy (Andrew) Cohen, original co-host of "Shut Up, Weirdo" from 2008 to 2012. Former Associate Editor of Newsweek.
- Gerard Cosloy, co-founder of Matador Records and former manager of Homestead Records.
- Hearty White (b. David Morris), is a radio host and musician best known as the frontman for Cold Water Army and his band Bag We Bag. Morris is also the creator of two radio personalities, Lee Harvey and Hearty White.
- Irwin Chusid, author, record producer and business manager/administrator for various artists.
- Jace Clayton (a.k.a. DJ /rupture), musician, DJ, writer, and producer.
- Jeff Conklin, host of "The Avant Ghetto" from 2014 to 2020. New music buyer for NYC record shop Academy Records.
- DA the DJ (b. Dave Amels), organist for the garage-rock band The Reigning Sound and co-founder of music technology companies Voce musical instruments and Bomb Factory Digital.
- Lou D'Antonio, host of "Hour of the Duck" from 1962 to 1990.
- Dave the Spazz (b. Dave Abramson), long-time host of "Music to Spazz By".
- Evan "Funk" Davies former Director of Business and Operations for Digital Media at VH1; currently Senior Product Manager at ASCAP.
- Dennis Diken, drummer for The Smithereens, record producer and music historian.
- Pat Duncan, hosted the punk rock focused "The Pat Duncan Show" from 1979 to 2009.
- Bob Fass, pioneering freeform radio host whose "Radio Unnameable" program originated from WFMU from 1977-1982, starting during one of many internal disputes at Fass's usual flagship, WBAI.
- Danny Fields, influential music industry manager, publicist, journalist and author from the 1960s to the 1980s.
- Donna Summer (b. Jason Forrest), electronic-music recording artist.
- Gaylord Fields, longtime WFMU DJ from 1992 to present. Rolling Stone editor. Writer for Spin and Spy. Former editor, AOL Music.
- Jo Firestone, film and TV comedy writer, producer and actress.
- Lamin Fofana, electronic music artist, producer and DJ who hosted a show on WFMU from 2011 to 2015.
- George Flores, host of WFMU's "The David & Goliath Show" from 1976 to 1994, later a top-rated DJ in Christian radio, hosting for many years a program at STAR 99.1 FM, now broadcasting at The Gate radio ministries.
- Otis Fodder (b. Larry McCort), member of mash-up recording artists The Bran Flakes.
- Ken Freedman, DJ and general manager who saved WFMU by coordinating the purchase of the station's broadcast license in 1994 when former license holder (Upsala College) faced bankruptcy.
- The Good Doctor / Dr. Bop (b. Michael D. Anderson), former musician in Sun Ra's Arkestra and former radio host on WBGO and SiriusXM. Executive director of the Sun Ra Music Archive.
- Devon E. Levins (b. Devon Goldberg), member of Morricone Youth, Pretendo and Creedle.
- Kenny G (b. Kenneth Goldsmith), artist, author, poet, journalist, exhibitionist and professor. Founder of archival website UbuWeb.
- Kurt Gottschalk, author and music journalist.
- Jason Grote, co-host of WFMU's "The Acousmatic Theater Hour"), playwright and television writer.
- Duane Harriott, host of "The Duane Train" and nephew of Jamaican singer and record producer Derrick Harriott.
- Dave Hill, comedian, actor, musician.
- Nicholas Hill, host from 1987-1997 of "The Live Music Faucet" (a.k.a. "The Music Faucet") from WFMU’s East Orange studios, various New York City clubs and his Brooklyn backyard; selected fill-in shifts through 2005. Also a producer and A&R man for Koch Records and the Singles Only Label (1988-1994); and host/co-producer of Radio Free Song Club (2009-2014).
- Mark Hurst, journalist, author, broadcaster, game designer and Internet entrepreneur.
- The Immigrant (b. Dan Behrman), founder of Immigrant Music, Inc. and DJ on from 1979 to 1991. Managed the musical artists such as Boukman Eksperyans, Dissidenten, Malicorne, Kristi Stassinopoulou and Saltarello. Program manager of The Montreal International Jazz Festival and Les Francos de Montréal and producer-host on CBC/Radio-Canada.
- Billy Jam, music journalist, host of "Put the Need On The Record" and founder of the Hip Hop Slam record label.
- Jesse Jarnow, journalist and author of Big Day Coming: Yo La Tengo and the Rise of Indie Rock (Gotham Books, 2012), and Heads: A Biography of Psychedelic America (Da Capo Press, 2016).
- Glen Jones, holder of the world record for the longest continuous radio broadcast by an individual (over 100 hours, set May 28, 2001).
- Ira Kaplan, singer and guitarist for Matador recording artists Yo La Tengo, and former rock journalist.
- Alex Kish, producer of "Sick Sounds" a semi-annual compilation CD.
- Johan Kugelberg, author, music historian, and former drummer for the band Action Swingers.
- Monica Lynch, longtime president of Tommy Boy Records and A&R advisor for Queen Latifah and Martina McBride.
- Dave Mandl, writer and editor (Semiotext(e)/Autonomedia, The Wire, The Brooklyn Rail).
- Jeff Mangum, founder and frontman of Neutral Milk Hotel.
- The Hound (b. Jim Marshall), longtime host of rockabilly, chitlin R&B and musical rarities, former co-owner of Manhattan's Lakeside Lounge
- Michele with One "L" (b. Michele Colomer), host of "Feelings" since 2019 and former co-host of "Shut Up Weirdo". Also Assistant Station Manager.
- Belinda Miller, co-host of Greasy Kid Stuff from 1994 to 2006 on WFMU and from 2006 to 2017 on XRAY.FM.
- R. Stevie Moore, Nashville-born pioneer of DIY home recording.
- Hova Najarian, co-host of Greasy Kid Stuff from 1994 to 2006 on WFMU and from 2006 to 2017 on XRAY.FM.
- Nick Name, host of the self-titled show from 2010 to 2020. Producer and proprietor of record label collective Care In The Community Recordings.
- Meredith Ochs, host of “Trash, Twang and Thunder” for more than a decade; music journalist, author, NPR commentator, Sirius XM Radio host, and singer-songwriter/guitarist with The Damn Lovelys.
- Frank O'Toole, former guitarist for the band Speed the Plough.
- People Like Us (b. Vicki Bennett), experimental musician/recording/video artist.
- Clay Pigeon (b. Kacy Ross), host of breakfast show "Wake" since 2017. Pigeon formerly hosted a street interview programme called "The Dusty Show", as shown in the documentary film "One October", filmed in October 2008.
- The Professor (b. Michael Pool), radio zealot and host of WFMU's "The Audio Kitchen with the Professor" from 2001 to 2003.
- Bob Rixon, host of "Rix" from 1981 to 2008.
- Mike Rogers (a.k.a. "Mike in Tokyo Rogers"), lead singer of the Rotters. Producer, writer of Ghostroads – A Japanese Rock N Roll Ghost Story.
- Douglas Rushkoff, New York–based writer, columnist, and lecturer on technology, media, and popular culture.
- Jeff Sarge (b. Jeff Sargeant), longtime reggae record producer since the 1970s who has hosted the show Sunday morning show "Reggae Schoolroom" for over 30 years.
- Vin Scelsa, longtime NYC broadcaster who has hosted shows on WNEW-FM, WLIR, WBAI, WABC-FM, WPLJ, WXRK, and WFUV.
- Tom Scharpling, writer and executive producer of the TV series Monk, voice actor on Steven Universe and music video director. Has been running The Best Show independently since 2014 after 13 years on WFMU.
- Nachum Segal, host of Jewish Moments in the Morning from 1983 to 2016
- Michael Shelley, singer/songwriter who runs the Confidential Recordings label.
- Steve Stein (a.k.a. Steinski), influential hip hop sampler and mixmaster, hosted a show called A Rough Mix with Steinski, first in the mid 90s and later in 2007 and 2014; the Mid-'90s shows were rebroadcast in 2012.
- Todd-O-Phonic Todd (b. Todd Abramson), former co-owner and booking agent of music venue Maxwell's in Hoboken, NJ. Proprietor of the Telstar Records label.
- Irene Trudel, program host who also engineered Jeff Buckley's first radio performances and Daniel Johnston via phone with Yo La Tengo in the studio for Nicholas Hill's "The Music Faucet"; Technical Director for WNYC's 'Soundcheck".
- Chris Tsakis (a.k.a. Chris T), host of the Sirius radio call-in show 'Freewheelin with Meredith Ochs and Chris T".
- Amedeo Turturro, founder of the comic book magazine INK.
- "weev" (b. Andrew Alan Escher Auernheimer), controversial media hacker and political commentator, formerly imprisoned for identity fraud and conspiracy. Banned from WFMU after two broadcasts of "Christian Living" in 2011.
- Mr. Fine Wine (b. Matt Weingarden), internationally known soul DJ and CD compiler.
- Wildgirl (b. Ericka Peterson), host in the 1980s and early 1990s of the Saturday night "Wildgirl's Rockin' Racing" as well as creator of the popular "Wildgirl's Go-Go-Rama" live shows at the Coney Island Sideshow.
- Frederick (Fred) Wisniewski, a DJ in the 1980s who, in February 1988, pleaded guilty and was convicted of manslaughter with a deadly weapon in Burlington County Superior Court in Mount Holly, New Jersey for the November 25, 1987 prearranged murder of his boss, scuba shop owner Julius Bittman in Wharton State Forest in exchange for $40,000 and a Mercedes-Benz 560SL automobile valued at $60,000.
- Douglas Wolk, host of the show Rhubarb Cake from 1999 to 2003. Owner of Dark Beloved Cloud records since 1992 and freelance writer for TIME, the New York Times, the Washington Post, Rolling Stone and other places.
- Bill Zebub (a.k.a. "Professor Dum-Dum"), publisher of the quarterly death metal magazine The Grimoire of Exalted Deeds and director of an extensive catalog of independent films.
