= Sir Loin =

Sir Loin, sirloin, or variant, may refer to:

== Sir Loin ==
=== Food ===
- sirloin (UK), a cut of meat
- sirloin (US), a cut of meat
- Sir Loin, a knighted cut of beef, see sirloin#Etymology
  - King James I of England's cut of beef, see Hoghton Tower
  - King Charles II of England's cut of beef, see Chingford#Landmarks
  - King Charles II of England's cut of beef, see Friday Hill, London

=== People ===
- Larry Lamb (newspaper editor) (1929-2000) UK newspaper editor, while working as a journalist at "The Australian", was nicknamed Sir Loin

==== Characters ====
- Sir Loin (mascot) an Angus Beef character mascot for the indoor football team of American football, the Omaha Beef

===== Fictional characters =====
- Sir Loin, a fictional character created by Thomas Hervey as the child of Father Christmas
- Sir Loin (fictional knight), a fictional character from the Japanese manga series (Japanese: 格闘料理伝説ビストロレシピ) Fighting Foodons
- Sir Loin (fictional bodyguard), a fictional character from the webseries New Stage
- Sir Loin (anthropomorphic steak), a fictional character from the webseries Oscar's Hotel for Fantastical Creatures
- Sir Loin (weasel), a fictional character from the French children's series Dynamo Duck
- Sir Loin of Beef (fictional title), a fictional title for the Sheriff of Nottingham from the Bugs Bunny cartoon Rabbit Hood
- Sir Loin of Beef (fictional knight), a fictional black knight from the Bugs Bunny cartoon Knighty Knight Bugs
- Sir Loin of Lamb (fictional knight), a fictional character from the UK children's cartoon Henry's Cat

== Sirloin ==
=== Food ===
- Sirloin (US), a cut of steak taken from the top of the (UK) rump steak
- Sirloin (UK), a cut of meat, from between the ribs and the pelvis
- Top sirloin (UK), a sirloin missing the tenderloin and bottom
- Bottom sirloin (UK), a sirloin missing the top sirloin
- Sirloin tip (UK), a triangular cut taken from the bottom sirloin

=== Other ===
- Super Sirloin, an episode of Aqua Teen Hunger Force

== See also ==
- Sir-Loin-A-Lot, a fictional item from the Simpsons episode Maximum Homerdrive
- To Sirloin with Love, an episode of King of the Hill
- Sirloin
- Loin
- Sir (disambiguation)
- Striploin
- Tenderloin (disambiguation)
