= Sir (disambiguation) =

Sir is a respectful form of address for a man, and a formal title used in the United Kingdom for knights and baronets.

Sir, SIR or SiR may also refer to:

== Places ==
=== Iran ===
- Sir, Iran, Fars Province
- Sir, Razavi Khorasan
- Sir, West Azerbaijan

=== Palestine ===
- Sir, Jenin
- Sir, Tulkarm

=== Elsewhere ===
- Sir Creek, on the India–Pakistan border
- Sır Dam, Turkey
- Saskatchewan International Raceway, Canada

== People ==
- Sir (singer), American singer, songwriter, record producer
- Jaroslav Šír (born 1923), Czechoslovak former skier
- József Sir (1912–1996), Hungarian sprinter
- Sedat Sir (born 1975), Turkish-Australian former Australian Rules footballer

== Entertainment ==
=== Characters ===
- Sir (A Series of Unfortunate Events), a fictional character in A Series of Unfortunate Events
- Sir, or Mark Thackeray, the title character of the 1967 film To Sir, with Love

=== Film ===
- Sir (1993 film), an Indian Hindi-language crime drama film
- Sir (2018 film), an Indian Hindi-language romantic drama film
- Sir (2023 film), an Indian Telugu-language version of Vaathi
- Sir (2024 film), an Indian Tamil-language action drama film
- Sir (2025 film), an Indian Odia-language drama film

=== Music ===
- Sir (album), by Fischerspooner, 2018
- "Sir", a song by Nicki Minaj from Queen, 2018

== Organizations ==
- Security Industry Registry, a corporate service provided by the New South Wales Police Force
- Sigma Iota Rho, a collegiate honour society for international studies
- Singapore Infantry Regiment, the main formation of the Singapore Army
- Society of Interventional Radiology, an American organization of health professionals
- Sons In Retirement, a fraternal organization of retired men

== Science and technology ==
- SIR model, a compartmental model of the progress of an epidemic
- Secondary image registration, a type of passive autofocus in cameras
- Sequential Importance Resampling, a particle filtering algorithm
- Serial Infrared, the physical layer of the IrDA standard for data transmission
- Short interest ratio, a metric signalling prevailing investors' sentiment
- Signal-to-interference ratio, the ratio of useful signal versus co-channel interference received
- Silent information regulator protein involved in regulating gene expression
- Supplemental inflatable restraint or airbag, a vehicle safety device

== Transportation ==
- Siantar railway station, Pematang Siantar, Indonesia
- South Indian Railway, an early Indian railway company
- Staten Island Railway, rapid transit line in the borough of Staten Island, New York, United States
- Surrey Iron Railway, a horse-drawn plateway that linked the former Surrey towns of Wandsworth and Croydon
- Sion Airport, the airport in Sion, Switzerland whose IATA code is SIR

== Other uses ==
- Sirene (Sir in Serbian), a type of cheese
- Statutory Invention Registration, a publication of an invention by the United States Patent and Trademark Office
- Special Intensive Revision, an exercise undertaken by the Election Commission of India to prepare the voters list

== See also ==
- Siir (disambiguation)
