= WMFU =

Repeater of WFMU, East Orange
- Mount Hope, New York; United States
- Frequency: 90.1 MHz
- Branding: 91.1 WFMU

Programming
- Format: Freeform radio

Ownership
- Owner: Auricle Communications

History
- Former call signs: WEXX (1990–1990); WDHZ (1990–1990); WXHD (1990–2009)
- Call sign meaning: Anagram of WFMU

Technical information
- Licensing authority: FCC
- Facility ID: 60031
- Class: A
- ERP: 1,100 watts
- HAAT: 183 meters
- Transmitter coordinates: 41°25′36″N 74°34′54″W
- Translator: 91.9 W220EG (New City)

Links
- Public license information: Public file; LMS
- Website: wfmu.org

WMFU (90.1 FM) is a radio station broadcasting a Variety format, licensed to Mount Hope, New York, United States. The station is owned by Auricle Communications.

Since 1996, WMFU has been a repeater station of WFMU, a radio station that is based in Jersey City, New Jersey, after Auricle (the owners of WFMU) received the station as a donation.

== History ==
The station went on the air as WEXX on April 3, 1990. On July 9, 1990, the station changed its call sign to WDHZ, again on September 3, 1990, to WXHD, and on May 10, 2009, to the current WMFU.

== See also ==
- WFMU/91.1 FM, licensed to East Orange, New Jersey
- List of WFMU Radio Hosts
- List of community radio stations in the United States
