= Wild Girl =

Wild Girl or The Wild Girl(s) or Wildgirl may refer to:

== Films ==
- The Wild Girl (1917 film), an American comedy drama film directed by Howard Estabrook
- The Wild Girl (1925 film), an American drama film directed by William Bletcher
- The Wild Girl (1928 film), a Polish silent drama film directed by Henryk Szaro
- The Wild Girl, a 2010 Hallmark Movie Channel original movie
- Wild Girl (film) (1932), an American pre-Code historical drama western film

== Printed media ==
- Wild Girl (comics) (2000s)
- Wild Girl (2009), novel by Patricia Reilly Giff
- The Wild Girl (novel) (1984), novel by Michèle Roberts
- The Wild Girl (2006), children's book by Christopher Wormell
- The Wild Girl (2006), novel by Jim Fergus
- The Wild Girls (2011), a short story collection by Ursula K. Le Guin
- The Wild Girls (2008), children's novel by Pat Murphy

== Other uses ==
- Wildgirl, artist and former WFMU DJ
