= Tribeca Film Institute =

American arts organisation founded 2001

- Location: 32 6th Ave 27 fl, New York, NY 10013
- Official language: International
- Website: www.tfiny.org

The Tribeca Film Institute (TFI) is a non-profit arts organization based in New York City, founded in 2001 by Robert De Niro, Jane Rosenthal and Craig Hatkoff following the September 11 attacks as a means to revitalize the arts community in lower Manhattan. TFI launched its first program in 2002, the Tribeca Film Festival.

In 2003, the founders spun off the Tribeca Film Festival from TFI into a new for-profit entertainment company they established: Tribeca Enterprises. TFI then shifted focus to emerging filmmakers, launching several funding and mentorship programs over the next 17 years.

In September 2020, TFI paused its programming in the wake of the COVID-19 pandemic. Less than 10 staff members were laid off, while the rest of TFI's staff were placed at Tribeca Enterprises.

In July 2021, TFI announced the launch of STAR, the Storefront Arts Recovery Initiative. The program is intended to foster collaboration between property owners and artists to allow storefronts left vacant due to the COVID-19 pandemic to transform through art.

== Program history ==
Timeline of TFI programming:

=== 2002 ===
TFI launched the Tribeca Film Festival, which spun off into Tribeca Enterprises the following year.

=== 2003 ===
TFI partnered with the Alfred P. Sloan Foundation to launch the TFI Sloan Filmmaker Fund, its first funding and mentorship program for emerging filmmakers.

=== 2004 ===
TFI launched Tribeca All Access, a film program for creators who experience inequality based on factors such as race, gender, class, sexuality, age, ethnicity, citizenship, and/or ability.

=== 2005 ===
TFI launched Our City, My Story, a competition for films by New York City students, celebrating the work of the city's youth filmmakers.

=== 2007 ===
TFI launched the TFI Screening Series as a media literacy program that provided New York City youth, educators, and community partners with free access to relevant programming and discussions.

=== 2008 ===
TFI launched the Gucci Tribeca Documentary Fund, its first annual fund focused on documentaries that tackle social issues around the world.

=== 2010 ===
TFI branded the annual networking event for Tribeca All Access at the Tribeca Film Festival as the TFI Network. It provided an opportunity for filmmakers to meet with industry representatives.

=== 2011 ===
TFI launched Tribeca Film Fellows, a year-round fellowship program for young filmmakers from historically underserved communities.

=== 2014 ===
TFI expanded the TFI Screening Series to include a program at Otisville Correctional Facility in Upstate New York in partnership with John Jay College of Criminal Justice and the New York State Department of Corrections and Community Supervision. TFI also created its Interactive Department to embrace new ways of storytelling emerging through technologies such as virtual reality.

=== 2015 ===
TFI launched the TFI/ESPN Future Filmmaker Prize for emerging filmmakers whose perspectives and backgrounds have been historically underrepresented on both sides of the camera. TFI also launched the Camden/TFI Filmmaker Retreat in partnership with the Camden International Film Festival, which granted documentary filmmakers a retreat in Maine for a series of mentoring sessions.

=== 2016 ===
TFI launched IF/Then Shorts, which awards project funding and mentorship to storytellers creating short documentary films that reflect one's community and perspective.

=== 2020 ===
TFI launched the Emergency Artist Support Fund to provide financial assistance to artists who lost work due to the COVID-19 pandemic.

=== 2021 ===
TFI launched STAR, the Storefront Arts Recovery Initiative, to foster collaboration between property owners and artists to allow storefronts left vacant due to the COVID-19 pandemic to transform through art.

== Youth initiatives ==
TFI worked with the City of New York Department of Education (DOE) on the filmmaking component of their Summer Arts Institute. TFI also partnered with the DOE to develop the Blueprint for the Teaching and Learning of the Moving Image, a curriculum guide for the study of film, television, and animation from grades K – 12 that sets a citywide standard for teaching media arts.

TFI ran multiple youth programs in New York City, including Tribeca Teaches: Films in Motion, an in-school and after-school filmmaking residency; the Tribeca Youth Screening Series, which aimed to integrate film into the classroom curricula; Tribeca Film Fellows, which brought NYC high-school students behind-the-scenes of the Tribeca Film Festival; the Summer Arts Institute; and Our City, My Story, an annual showcase of youth-made films.

== Board of Directors ==
The Tribeca Film Institute Board of Directors is composed of Robert De Niro, Co-chair, Jane Rosenthal, Co-chair, Alberta Arthurs, Vice Chair, Serena Altschul, Martin Edelman, Eli Evans, Craig Hatkoff, Lisa Hsia, Jennifer Maguire Isham, Sheila Nevins, Norman Pearlstine, Sam Pollard, Laurie Racine, Scott Rechler, John G. Roche, Martin Scorsese, Judy Tabb, Jonathan Tisch, Todd Wagner, and Jeffrey Wright.
