= Michael Sorrentino =

American television personality (born 1981)

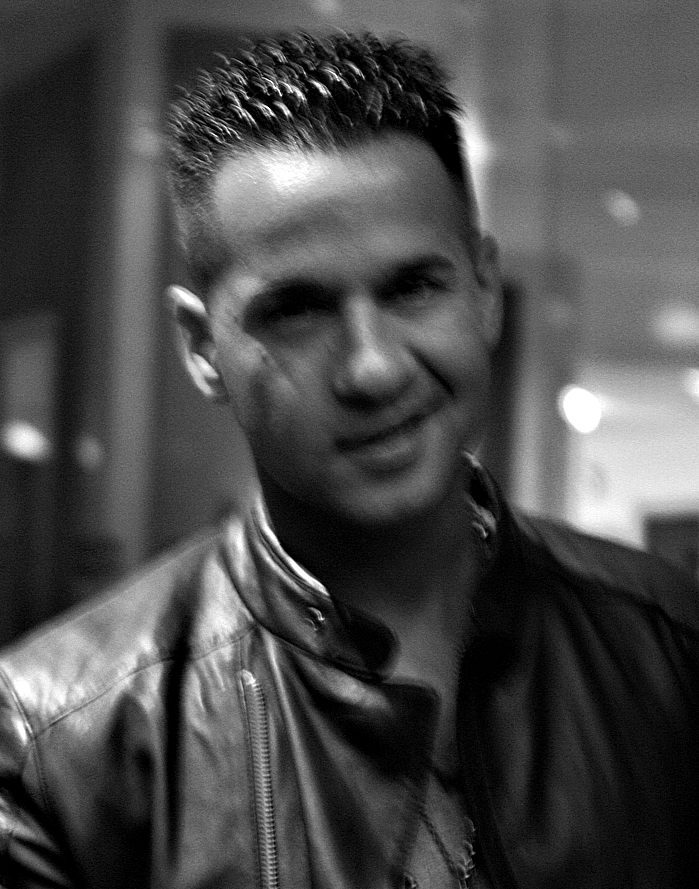
- A shaky image of Sorrentino in 2012
- Born: Michael Paul Sorrentino; July 4, 1981 (age 45); New York City, U.S.
- Other name: The Situation
- Education: Brookdale Community College
- Occupation: Television personality
- Years active: 2009–present
- Known for: Jersey Shore; Dancing with the Stars; Celebrity Big Brother; Jersey Shore: Family Vacation; The Roast of Donald Trump
- Spouse: Lauren Pesce (m. 2018)
- Children: 3

Michael Paul Sorrentino (born July 4, 1981), also known by his nickname The Situation, is an American reality television personality. He appeared on all six seasons of the MTV reality show Jersey Shore from 2009 through 2012, and has since returned to the franchise with Jersey Shore: Family Vacation.

== Early life ==
Sorrentino was born in West New Brighton, Staten Island, New York, and raised in Manalapan, New Jersey, where he graduated from Manalapan High School in 1999. He obtained an associate degree from Brookdale Community College and attended Kean University and Monmouth University. Before his time on Jersey Shore, Mike was a stripper. He also was an underwear model and fitness model.

== Career ==
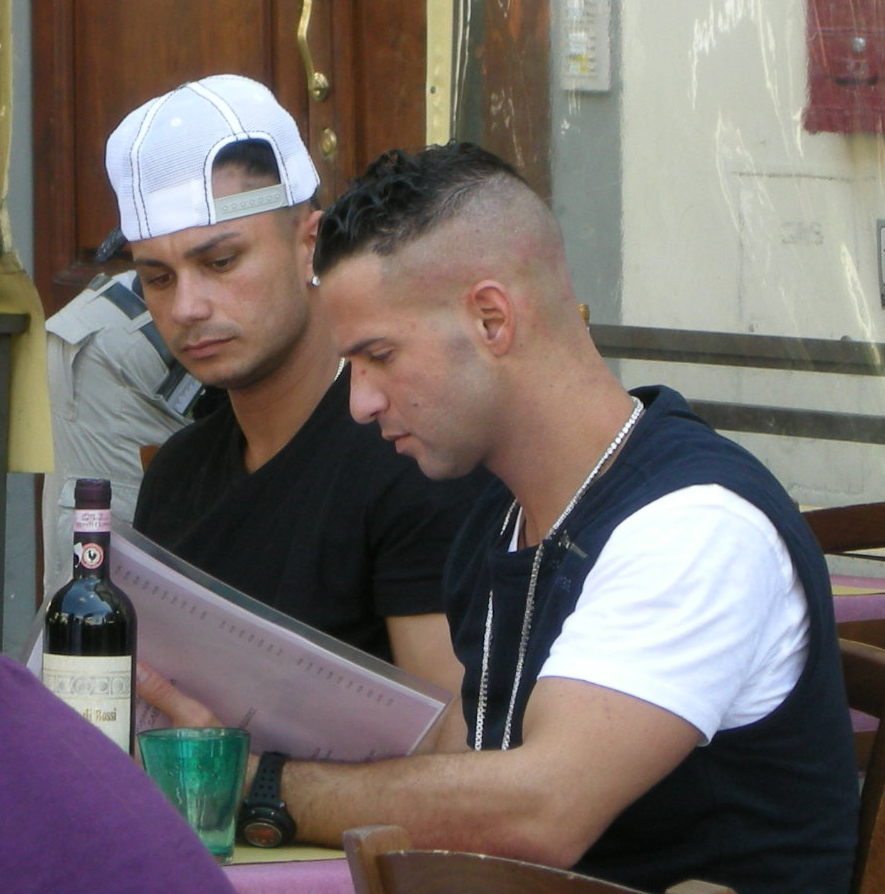
Sorrentino (right) with Jersey Shore cast member Pauly D, 2011

Sorrentino was a cast member of Jersey Shore, which ran from 2009 to 2012. Since appearing on that show, Sorrentino has been a guest on TV series including The Howard Stern Show, The Tonight Show with Conan O'Brien, The Jay Leno Show, Lopez Tonight, SportsNation, Chelsea Lately, The Ellen DeGeneres Show, and Conan.

In 2010, Sorrentino made more than $5 million, the second highest of any other reality star after Kim Kardashian. This money was accrued through endorsements with Devotion Vodka, Reebok Zigtech shoes, as well as a ghost-written autobiography, a rap song, a workout DVD, a vitamin line for GNC, a clothing line, and appearances on Jersey Shore and season 11 of Dancing with the Stars. His partner was Karina Smirnoff. He made it to the 4th week before being eliminated. That year, he also appeared with Bristol Palin in a public service announcement for The Candie's Foundation, as part of its Pause Before You Play campaign to prevent teen pregnancy.

In January 2011, Sorrentino signed on to star as a judge in the YOBI.tv talent-show web series New Stage. In March 2011, Sorrentino appeared on the Comedy Central Roast of Donald Trump. His performance was poorly received by audiences and critics. During his set, Sorrentino's jokes elicited jeers from the audience, prompting veteran roaster Jeff Ross to intervene. In August of that year, Sorrentino was offered $10,000 by fashion retailer Abercrombie & Fitch not to wear the company's clothes. A spokesman for the company explained that "Mr. Sorrentino's association with our brand could cause significant damage to our image." In November 2011, Sorrentino filed a lawsuit against A&F after they made shirts that read "The Fitchuation" and "GTL...You Know The Deal." This case, however, was dismissed before proceeding to trial.

In 2012, On February 22, 2012, Sorrentino appeared in a small cameo role on ABC's Suburgatory. Sorrentino made a cameo in The Three Stooges, released in April 2012, alongside his fellow Jersey Shore cast members such as Ronnie Ortiz-Magro, Sammi “Sweetheart” Giancola, and Nicole “Snooki” Polizzi LaValle. In June 2012, he participated in FOX's dating game show The Choice. On August 15, 2012, he became a housemate on the tenth series of Celebrity Big Brother on Channel 5 and on September 7, 2012, he came in fourth on the series final. In October 2012, he appeared in a PETA advertising campaign promoting the spaying and neutering of pets.

In 2014, he appeared on a reality show with his family, which aired on the TVGN network. In the following year in 2015, he was a participant on the fifth season of Marriage Boot Camp: Reality Stars with his partner, Lauren Pesce.

In April 2017, Sorrentino appeared on We TV's Marriage Boot Camp: Reality Stars Family Edition with his brothers Marc and Maximo Sorrentino.

In 2018, Sorrentino reunited with most of his Jersey Shore cast members in Jersey Shore: Family Vacation, a reboot of the series. The first and second seasons aired in 2018 with Sorrentino as a main cast member. It was confirmed in May 2019 that he will “be a huge part” of the third season, including documentation of his wedding, court sentencing, and events leading up to his jail time.

== Personal life ==
Sorrentino has claimed his nickname "The Situation" came from when he was complimented regarding his physique while in public, causing a "situation" between an unnamed couple.

Sorrentino worked as an assistant manager of a fitness center on Staten Island. When he was 25, he lost this job and began underwear modeling.

=== Legal troubles ===
On June 17, 2014, Sorrentino was arrested for assault after a fight with his brother at their family's tanning salon in Middletown, New Jersey. He completed a 12-week anger management program in connection with the incident.

=== Marriage and family ===
On April 26, 2018, Sorrentino announced he had become engaged to Lauren Pesce, his college sweetheart since 2004. They married on November 1, 2018. Sorrentino said in November 2019 that Pesce had suffered a miscarriage approximately seven weeks into her pregnancy. On November 24, 2020, Sorrentino announced they were again expecting a child. Their son was born on May 26, 2021. On August 1, 2022, Sorrentino announced they were expecting their second child. Their daughter was born on January 24, 2023. Their third, a daughter was born on March 6, 2024.

In addition to his brothers, he has a younger sister, Melissa, who appeared as a bride in Say Yes to the Dress. His brother Marc also served as The Situation's manager and partner in MPS Entertainment, LLC, and Situation Nation, Inc.

=== Struggle with addiction ===
On March 21, 2012, Sorrentino publicly acknowledged that he had been struggling with an addiction to oxycodone, a prescription opioid pain medication. His addiction developed during his time on Jersey Shore. He described smuggling pills in his sneakers during the Italian season and had also bought $550,000 worth of drugs. At that time, he confirmed that he had entered rehab. He checked out of the Cirque Lodge treatment center in Utah on April 4, 2012. Sorrentino was in and out of rehab from 2012 to 2015. In November 2023, he told Entertainment Tonight, "I was into everything. I had everything on me at all times in my Louis Vuitton bag. Everything -- from a couple hundred Roxicet, which are 30 milligram oxycodone, then I'd have probably 150 Percocets on me, which are 10 milligram oxycodone. Then I would have about 100 Xanax on me, 100 Valium, and if I wasn't traveling on a plane, maybe I would have some weed and cocaine as well, 'cause I knew that if I traveled on a plane, not a good idea to try and go through security with cocaine and weed on you."

In 2023, Sorrentino stated he has been sober since December 2015. In December 2023, he released his memoir, Reality Check: Making the Best of The Situation -- How I Overcame Addiction, Loss, and Prison about his struggles and personal issues.

=== Tax evasion case ===
In September 2014, Sorrentino was charged with tax fraud for not paying taxes on $8.9 million. In April 2017, further charges were levied against Sorrentino and his brother Marc, alleging tax evasion and the structuring of bank deposits to avoid reporting thresholds.

On January 19, 2018, Sorrentino pleaded guilty to one count of tax evasion as part of a plea bargain with prosecutors. Sentencing occurred October 5, 2018, at the United States District Court for the District of New Jersey in Newark. Sorrentino was sentenced to eight months in prison. He also received two years of supervised probation, to begin after his release, and was ordered to perform 500 hours of community service and pay $123,913 in restitution and a criminal fine of $10,000. Sorrentino began his sentence on January 15, 2019, at the Federal Correctional Institution, in Otisville, New York. He was released on September 12, 2019.

On January 17, 2019, Sorrentino's brother Marc began serving a two-year prison sentence at the Federal Correctional Institution in Fairton, New Jersey, approximately 200 miles (320 km) away from the Otisville Federal Correctional Institution. He was given an early release date of September 28, 2020.

== Filmography ==
Year	Program	Role	Notes
2009–12	Jersey Shore	Himself	Cast member
2010	Dancing with the Stars	Himself	Contestant (9th place)
2011	New Stage	Angel Adonis	
2011	The Roast of Donald Trump	Himself	Roaster
2012	Suburgatory	D.J.	
2012	Celebrity Big Brother	Himself	Housemate (4th place)
2012	The Three Stooges	Himself	
2012	The Choice	Himself	
2014	The Sorrentinos	Himself	
2015	Marriage Boot Camp: Reality Stars	Himself	
2016	Worst Cooks in America: Celebrity Edition	Himself	Contestant (4th place)
2017	Marriage Boot Camp: Reality Stars Family Edition	Himself	
2018–2026	Jersey Shore: Family Vacation	Himself	Cast member
2019	Hollywood Medium with Tyler Henry	Himself	Season 4, Episode 5
2020	Celebrity Family Feud	Himself	Season 7, Episode 4
2021	Ron's Gone Wrong	Biker	(voice)
2022	Buckhead Shore	Himself	Episodes 11 & 12
