= Meredith Ochs =

Meredith Ochs is an American radio commentator, DJ, author, journalist and musician. She is a Gracie Award honoree for her work in radio.

Ochs is a commentator for National Public Radio's All Things Considered and has appeared on Talk of the Nation. She was a frequent guest on All Songs Considered.

Ochs is the author of three books, Rock-and-Roll Woman (Sterling, 2018), Aretha: The Queen of Soul, and Bruce Springsteen: An Illustrated Biography (Quarto, 2018). She contributed to the Belmont award-winning Woman Walk the Line: How the Women in Country Music Changed Our Lives (UT Press, 2017).

Ochs is a talk show host at Sirius XM Satellite Radio. Her program Freewheelin aired weekdays 11 am – 2 pm ET (replayed weeknights 8–11 pm ET, Saturday and Sunday 11 am – 2 pm ET). Ochs also hosts a music show on the Outlaw Country channel, Mondays and Tuesdays 8 pm – midnight ET.

Ochs was a contributing editor and writer at Guitar World magazine. Her writing has appeared in numerous other publications, including Entertainment Weekly, Rolling Stone, Salon.com, the Boston Phoenix, the Houston Chronicle and New York Magazine. Her photographs have appeared in Guitar World, Experience Hendrix and other publications.

Ochs plays guitar, sings and writes songs for the Damn Lovelys. Their debut, Trouble Creek, was released on Philadelphia indie label, Dren Records, in 2004 and earned them an appearance on "Mountain Stage", the internationally syndicated PRI radio program, the following year. She also played bass and sang with New Orleans-born R&B/soul singer Jesse Thomas (known as "Young Jesse" when he worked with Huey "Piano" Smith, Earl King and other New Orleans performers). She periodically performs with blues/R&B band Miss Lucy & Walker Blue, along with Brazilian harmonica player Alex "Pardal" Siclari and members of Eaglemania, The Porchistas and the Zydeco Revelators.

For more than a decade, Ochs hosted a weekly show, "Trash, Twang and Thunder," on freeform radio station WFMU. The show focused on American roots music: country, blues, soul, R&B and bluegrass, and often featured live performances by artists including Son Volt's Jay Farrar, country singer Pam Tillis, and Allman Brothers alumnus Derek Trucks. Ochs later co-hosted with and filled in for WFMU alum Vin Scelsa at WFUV, where she worked part-time as a DJ. Ochs also worked at WNYC and WXRK (K-Rock) in New York City, as well as the ABC Radio Network.

Two characters in the children's book series The Trouble with Chickens by author Doreen Cronin, are named after Ochs and her husband.
