= Menzelet Dam =

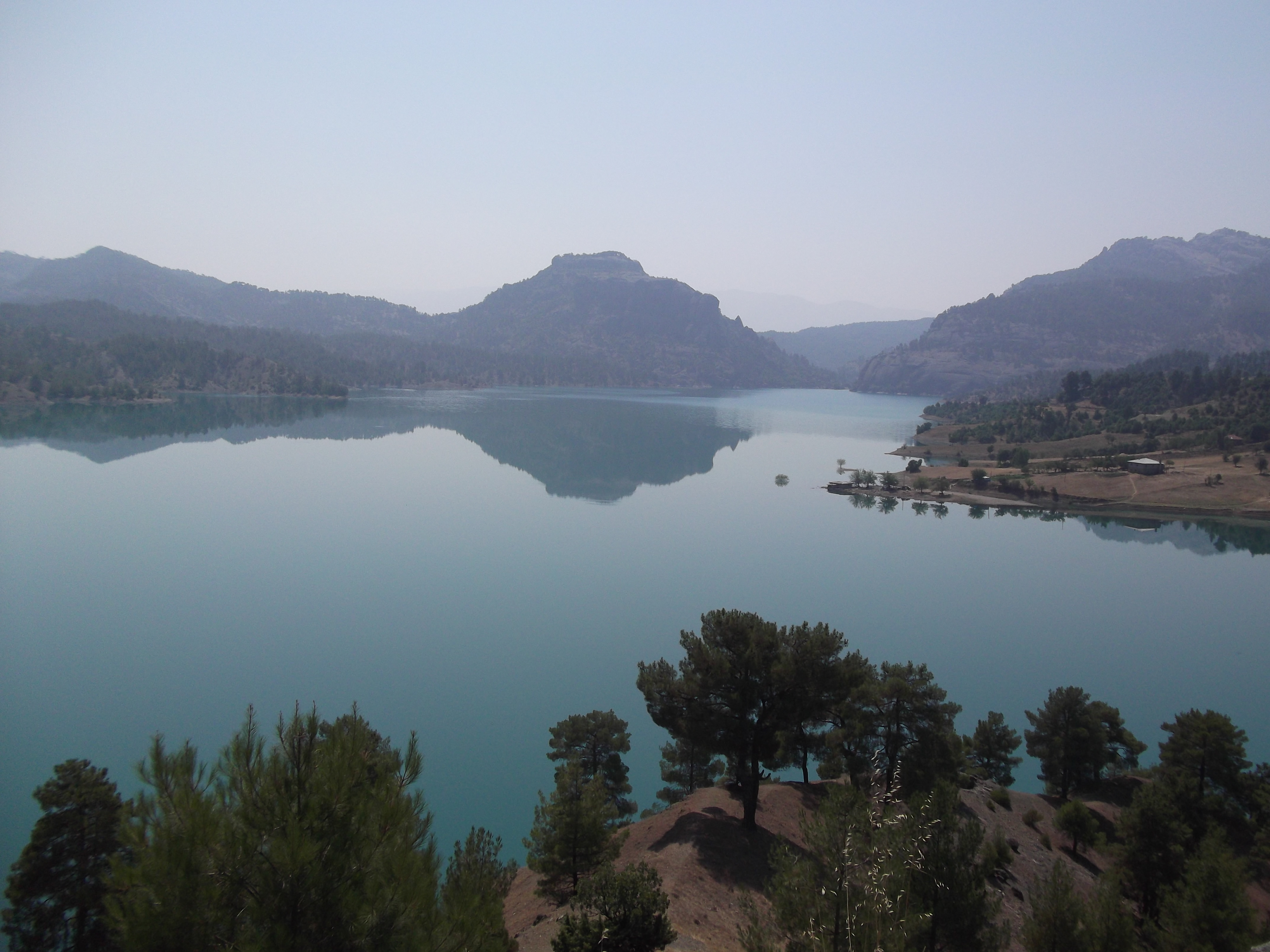
- Location: Turkey
- Coordinates: 37.6761°N 36.8508°E
- Construction began: 1980
- Opening date: 1989

Dam and spillways
- Impounds: Ceyhan River
- Height: 151 m (495 ft)
- Dam volume: 8,700,000 m^{3} (11,379,170 cu yd)

Reservoir
- Total capacity: 1,950,000,000 m^{3} (1,580,891 acre⋅ft)
- Surface area: 42 km^{2} (16 sq mi)

Power Station
- Installed capacity: 124 MW
- Annual generation: 515 GWh

Menzelet Dam is an embankment dam on the Ceyhan River in Kahramanmaraş Province, Turkey. The development was backed by the Turkish State Hydraulic Works.

== See also ==
- List of dams and reservoirs in Turkey
