= Bill Zebub =

American film maker

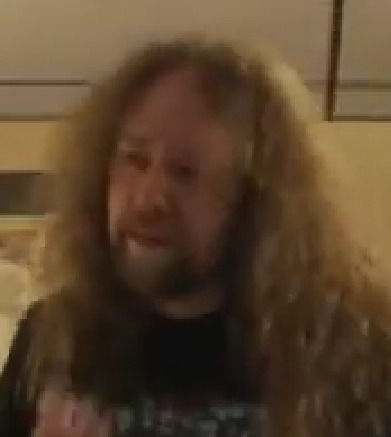
Bill Zebub in 2006

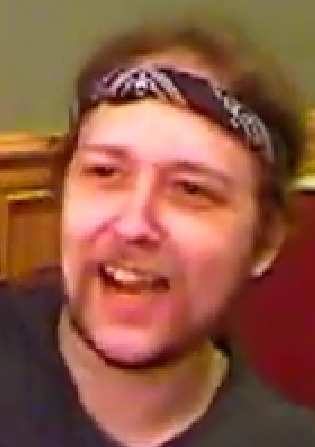
Bill Zebub in the 1990s

Bill Zebub is the manager of Bill Zebub Productions. His production company publishes a quarterly magazine titled The Grimoire of Exalted Deeds, mainly about death metal music and independent movies. He has made an array of low-budget films, and also is the host of a radio show on WFMU in the New Jersey area. He hosts the show under the alias 'Professor Dum Dum'. His stage name is a pun on the Hebrew demon, named Beelzebub.

== The Grimoire of Exalted Deeds ==
The Grimoire of Exalted Deeds is a metal magazine published by Bill Zebub. Each issue consists of interviews with metal bands, CD and DVD reviews. The interviews are generally comedic with a sarcastic nature. The magazine contains non-pornographic nudity, and is available in print and on-line.

It was originally published starting in 1991 as a photocopied fanzine, and as the magazine grew more popular within the heavy metal community, it was later published with a glossy cover. By 1997, the magazine was chosen as the official magazine and program of the Milwaukee Metalfest. It is now published approximately quarterly, in an all-glossy format.

The magazine features interviews of various heavy metal musicians, which Bill Zebub frequently conducts in Elizabethan English, for comedic effect. Occasionally, the magazine offers brief fiction pieces, and articles on various subjects relating to fantasy or mysticism. Criticism of organized religion, particularly Christianity, is another recurring topic. The magazine also includes a feature called "Grimoire Girls", female metal fans who submit photographs of themselves in varying states of undress.

== Professor Dum Dum's Lab ==
Bill Zebub has a weekly radio show on 91.1 FM WFMU, airing Monday nights at midnight until 3 am Tuesday morning Eastern time. Zebub plays the character 'Professor Dum Dum: Scientist of Music and Human Behavior' who hails from Germany. The Professor plays heavy metal music and discusses topics with callers.

== Filmography ==
- Metalheads (2001)
- Dirtbags: The Armpit of Metal (2002)
- Death metal: A Documentary (2002)
- Metal Radio KCUF (2003)
- Skits-O-Phrenia (2003)
- Jesus Christ: Serial Rapist (2003)
- Kill the Scream Queen (2004)
- The Crucifier (2004)
- The Worst Horror Movie Ever Made (2005)
- Bad Acid (2005)
- Rape is a Circle (2006)
- Girls of Bill Zebub's Movies (2006)
- Dolla Morte (2006)
- Assmonster: The Making of a Horror Movie (2006)
- Spooked (2007)
- Frankenstein The Rapist (2008)
- Forgive Me for Raping You (2008)
- Zombiechrist (2010)
- Antfarm Dickhole (2011)
- Indie Director (2013)
- Dickshark (2016)
- Clowna Nostra (2019)
