= Kılavuzlu Dam =

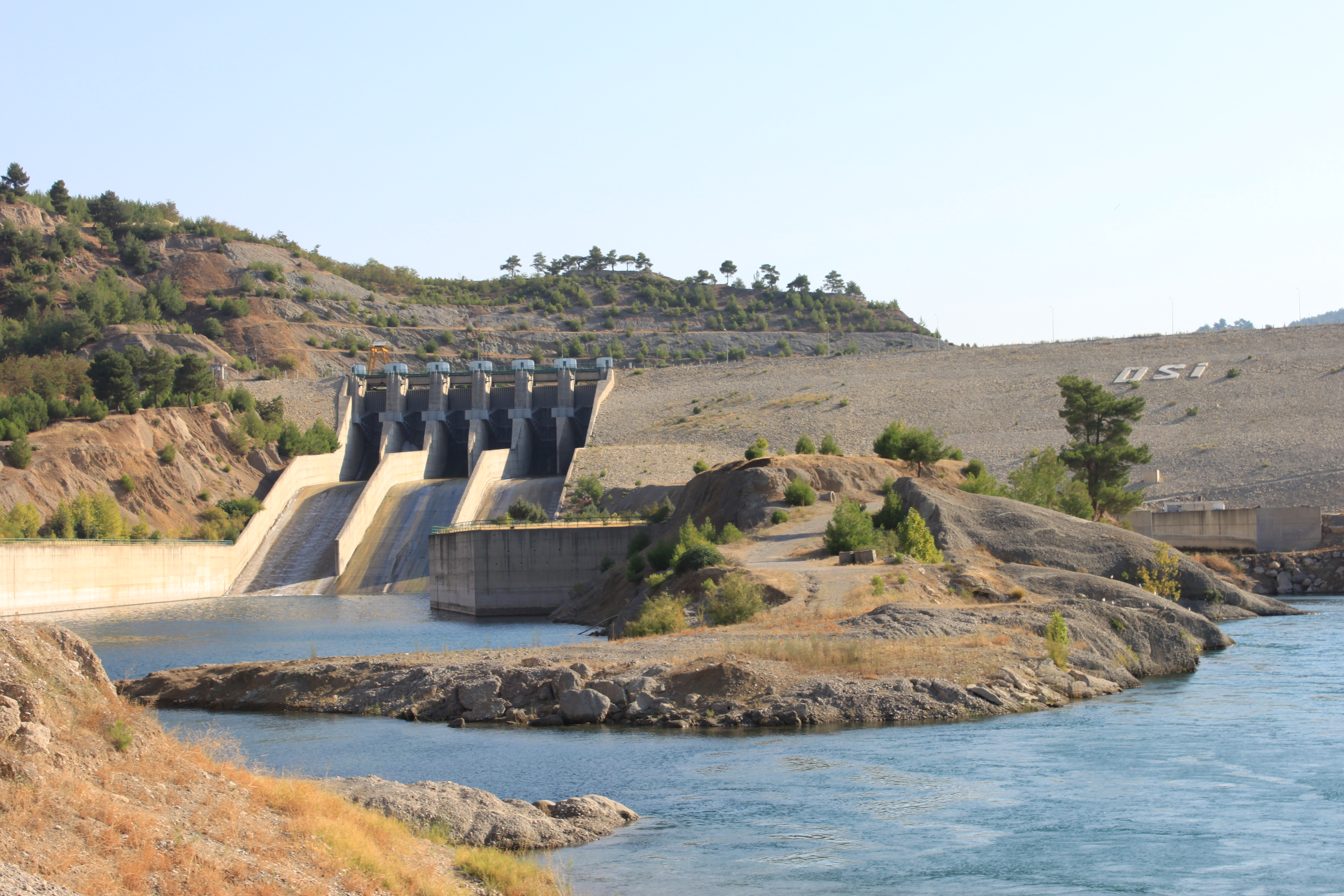
- Dam of the Kılavuzlu Reservoir (Baraj); River Ceyhan, in Kahramanmaraş
- Location: Turkey
- Coordinates: 37.6268°N 36.8045°E
- Construction began: 1996
- Opening date: 2001

Dam and spillways
- Impounds: Ceyhan River
- Height: 59 m (194 ft)

Reservoir
- Total capacity: 69,000,000 m^{3} (55,939 acre⋅ft)
- Surface area: 3 km^{2} (1 sq mi)

Power Station
- Installed capacity: 54 MW
- Annual generation: 100 GWh

The Kılavuzlu Dam is an embankment dam on the Ceyhan River in Kahramanmaraş Province, Turkey. Constructed between 1996 and 2001, the development was backed by the Turkish State Hydraulic Works. The dam supports a 54 MW power station and supplies water for the irrigation of 178,000 hectares (440,000 acres).

== See also ==
- List of dams and reservoirs in Turkey
