= Greasy Kid Stuff =

Greasy Kid Stuff was an American radio show that aired Saturday mornings from 9-10 AM (Pacific Time) on KXRY 91.1 FM and 107.1 FM, and live and archived at XRAY.FM in Portland, Oregon. It was hosted by Belinda Miller, Hova Najarian, and their daughter Georgia (a/k/a "DJ Georgia"; f/k/a "DJ Waah Waah"). The program was known for playing non-traditional and offbeat music from many genres that children could appreciate, much of it rock and roll that was not originally created with children in mind. From 1994 to 2006 the show was on WFMU, the New York/New Jersey area freeform station.

Based in Portland since 2004, Belinda and Hova continued to produce Greasy Kid Stuff remotely for a couple of years, running the show from their home and sending a live feed to WFMU's Jersey City studios through the phone line. In 2006, they launched the Portland version of Greasy Kid Stuff on KNRK 94/7 Alternative Portland.

Three compilation CDs of Greasy Kid Stuff favorites have been issued on the Confidential Recordings record label, all with art by Rodney Alan Greenblat.

They Might Be Giants featured a song on their podcast entitled "Greasy Kid Stuff" in honor of the radio show. . Caspar Babypants (a.k.a. Chris Ballew from PUSA) also wrote and recorded a song called "Hova and Belinda" for Greasy Kid Stuff.
