= Ceyhan River =

River in Turkey

Coordinates: 36.5652°N 35.5609°E

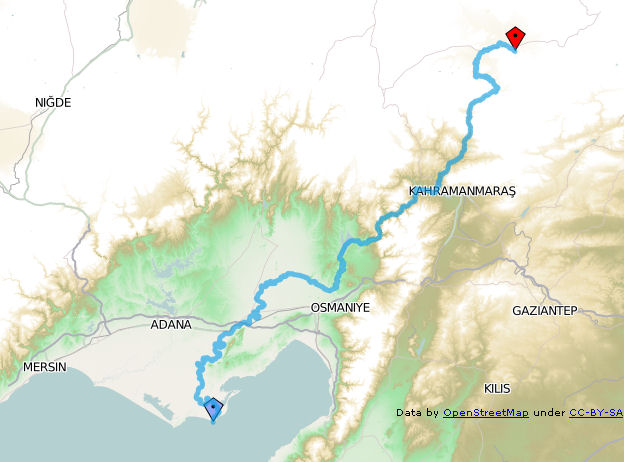
Ceyhan River from its source to Mediterranean Sea

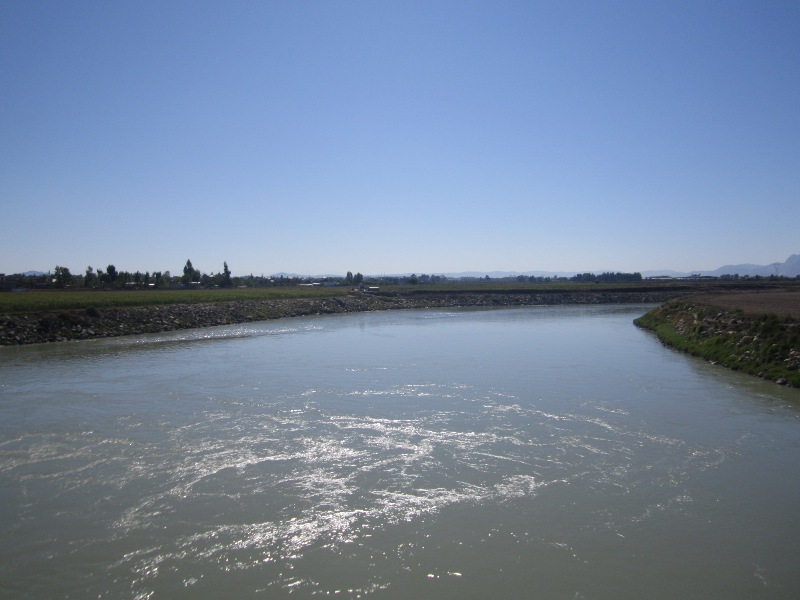
A view from Ceyhan River

The Ceyhan River (historically Pyramos or Pyramus (Greek: Πύραμος), Leucosyrus (Greek: Λευκόσυρος) or Jihun) is a river in Anatolia in the south of Turkey.

== Course of the river ==
The Ceyhan River (Pyramus) has its source (known as Söğütlü Dere) at a location called Pınarbaşı 3 km (1.9 mi) on the Nurhak Mountains of the Eastern Taurus Mountains range, southeast of the town of Elbistan in the Kahramanmaraş province of Turkey. According to classical references its source is at Cataonia near the town of Arabissus. Its main tributaries are called Harman, Göksun, Mağara Gözü, Fırnız, Tekir, Körsulu, Aksu (which joins Ceyhan at the outskirts of Kahramanmaraş), Çakur, Susas, and Çeperce. Its total length is 509 kilometres (316 mi).

In classical times for a time it passed under ground, but then came forward again as a navigable river, and forced its way through a glen of Mount Taurus, which in some parts was so narrow that Strabo claims a dog or hare could leap across it. Its course, which to this point had been south, then turned to the southwest, and reached the sea. The river was deep and rapid; its average breadth was 1 stadium.

At present, because of the narrow deep valleys that used to exist, the Ceyhan River has been dammed for hydroelectric generation, for flood control and for providing irrigation to the fertile Çukurova region. The main hydroelectric generating dams are at Menzelet, Kılavuzlu, Aslantaş, Sır and Berke. Of the deep valleys, only the one called Kısıklı Canyon exists in its natural form, south of the location the Menzelet Dam.

The quantity of water flow on the Ceyhan River changes greatly season by season. During August and September the river is at its lowest flow. During November and December the autumn rains temporarily raise the water flow rate from 50 to 380 cubic metres per second (1,800 to 13,400 cu ft/s). In January the flow rate decreases until mid-February. As the snows melt in the Taurus Mountains during spring and early summer months, the flow increases and, periodically caused flooding prior to its damming. During the last quarter of the 20th century, during the floods, the two rivers of the Çukurova plain, the Ceyhan River and the Seyhan River, joined at least 6 times.

In classical times the Ceyhan River reached the Mediterranean Sea at Mallus. Currently this location is inland a few miles from the Mediterranean coast on an elevation in the Karataş Peninsula, Adana Province, Turkey, a few miles from the town of Karataş. In classical times it carried with it such a quantity of mud, that, according to an ancient oracle, its deposits would one day reach the island of Cyprus, and thus unite it with the mainland. The delta formed at the mouth of the Ceyhan River is a refuge for wetlands birds and some years their numbers reach a few million. The sand bank in front is famed for nesting ground for sea turtles.
