= Berke Dam =

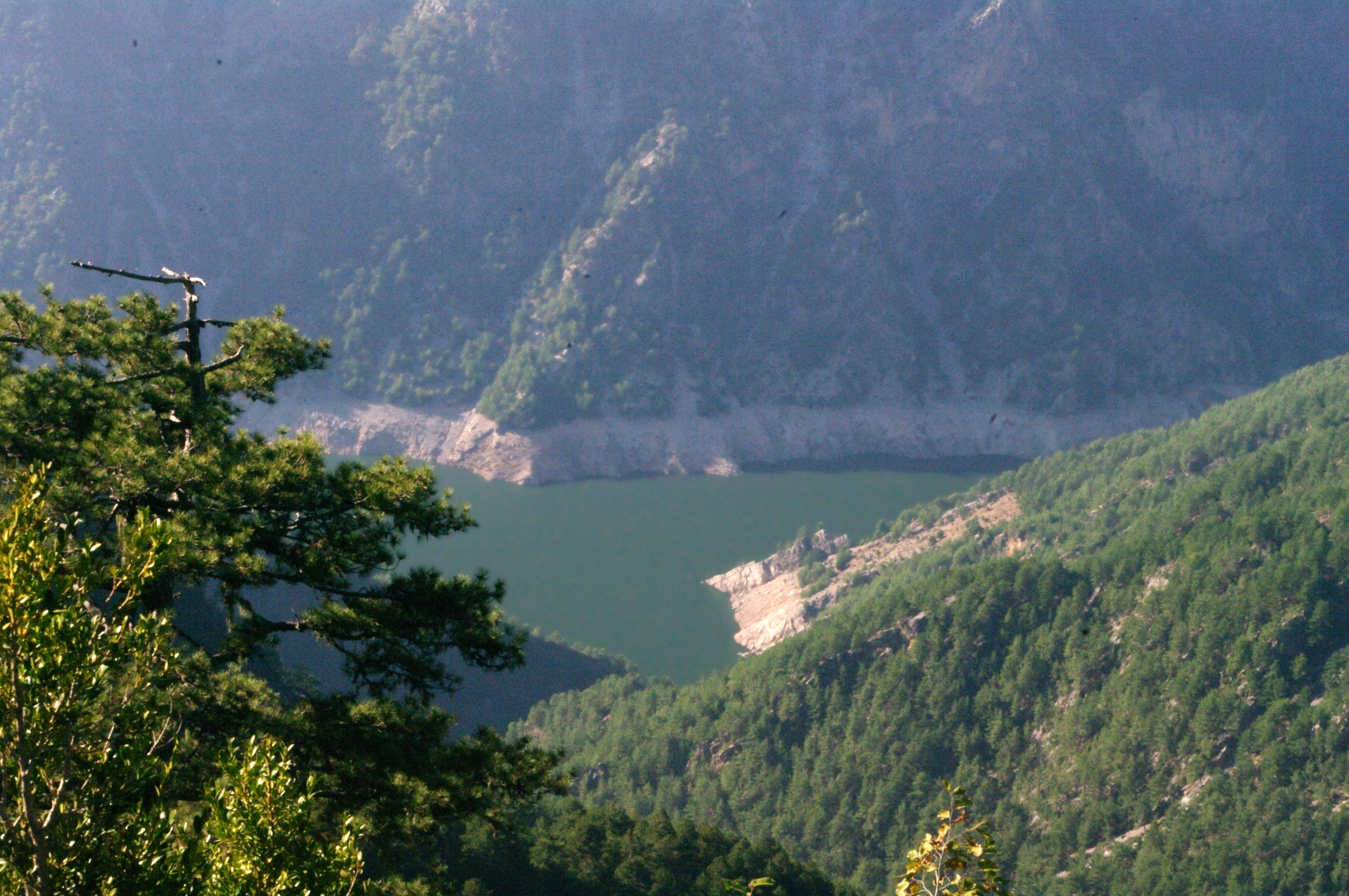
- Interactive map of Berke Dam
- Location: Turkey
- Coordinates: 37.373256°N 36.461347°E
- Construction began: 1995
- Opening date: 1999

Dam and spillways
- Impounds: Ceyhan River
- Height: 201 m (659 ft)

Reservoir
- Total capacity: 427,000,000 m^{3} (346,175 acre⋅ft)

Power Station
- Turbines: 3 x 170 MW
- Installed capacity: 510 MW
- Annual generation: 1670 GWh

Berke Dam (Turkish: Berke Barajı) is concrete arch-gravity dam built on the Ceyhan river in southern Turkey. There is a hydroelectric power plant, established in 2001 at the dam, with a power output of 510 MW (three facilities at 170 MW each). "Technical Data" Tunnels = Water Intake Tunnel: 7200 meter; Highway Access Tunnel: 4300 meter & Grouting galleries; HRT: 6200 meter
