= A Piece of the Night =

1978 novel by Michèle Roberts

- First edition
- Author: Michèle Roberts
- Language: English
- Publisher: The Women's Press
- Publication date: 1978
- Publication place: United Kingdom
- Media type: Print

A Piece of the Night is Michèle Roberts' first published novel, released in 1978. The novel is semi-autobiographical. It was described by Valentine Cunningham in New Statesman as "a runaway chaos of inchoate bits", and Blake Morrison wrote in The Times Literary Supplement that much of A Piece of the Night "gives the same impression of a book written under the stern eye of a women's workshop group". The novel won the Gay News Book Award 1979.
