= Indie Director =

- Directed by: Bill Zebub
- Starring: Angelina Leigh, Stephanie Anders, Clover St. Claire
- Cinematography: Bill Zebub
- Release date: May 25, 2013
- Running time: 135 minutes
- Country: United States
- Language: English

Indie Director is a 2013 independent film directed by Bill Zebub. The movie was released to DVD on May 25, 2013, and is a pseudodocumentary of Zebub's experiences with filmmaking and his creative process.

== Synopsis ==
Bill (Bill Zebub) is a struggling independent filmmaker who wants to create movies by his own rules. He has nothing but disdain for people who compromise their own values in order to succeed and vows never to fall into the trap that has lured other directors away from their own creative visions. However, when one of Bill's films becomes wildly popular in the porn industry- despite Bill never intending it to be seen as such- he finds himself preparing another movie in order to take advantage of his newfound success, essentially compromising his own strict standards.

== Cast ==
- Bill Zebub as Bill
- Angelina Leigh as Angela
- Stephanie Anders as Jessica
- Clover St. Claire as Svetlana
- Sheri Medulla as Olga
- Terra Incognita as Marissa
- Tiffany Loretta Carroll as Chrystal
- Donna Sheridan as Dave's Wife
- Ellie Church as Joyce Heckel
- Scarlett Storm as Giggling Actress
- Valerie Barattucci as Melanie
- Jeremiah Shaffer as Fan of toe tag
- Mike O'Mahony as Mike
- Steve Nebesni as Steve
- Adam P. Murphy as Belladonna

== Reception ==
Critical reception for Indie Director has been mostly positive. Fangoria and Ain't It Cool News both praised the film for its offbeat nature and sense of humor and Fangoria's Chris Alexander commented that the movie would not appeal to all audiences. Film Threat gave a mostly positive review as they felt that it "may not be great, but by God, it’s true, it’s insightful, and it’s fun." In contrast, DVD Talk panned the film overall and stated that although the movie did have some elements that "could have made for something interesting", it was "pretty painful to sit through" and it could have been improved with more editing.
