= Michèle Roberts =

British writer, novelist and poet (born 1949)

Michèle Roberts FRSL
- Born: Michèle Brigitte Roberts; 20 May 1949 (age 76); Bushey, Hertfordshire, England
- Education: Somerville College, Oxford; University College London
- Occupations: Novelist and poet
- Notable work: Daughters of the House (1992)
- Awards: WH Smith Literary Award
- Website: www.micheleroberts.co.uk

Michèle Brigitte Roberts FRSL (born 20 May 1949) is a British writer, novelist and poet. She is the daughter of a French Catholic teacher mother (Monique Caulle) and English Protestant father (Reginald Roberts), and has dual UK–France nationality.

== Early life ==
Roberts was born to a French Catholic mother and English Protestant father in Bushey, Hertfordshire, England, but was raised in Edgware, Middlesex. She was educated at a convent, expecting to become a nun, before reading English at Somerville College, Oxford, where she lost her Catholic faith. She also studied at University College London, training to be a librarian. She worked for the British Council in Bangkok, Thailand, in this role from 1973 to 1974.

== Career ==
Active in socialist and feminist politics (the Women's Liberation Movement) since the early 1970s, she formed a writers' collective with Sara Maitland, Michelene Wandor and Zoe Fairbairns. At this time, Roberts was the Poetry Editor (1975–77) at Spare Rib, the feminist magazine, and later at City Limits (1981–83). Her first novel, A Piece of the Night, was published in 1978. Her 1992 novel Daughters of the House was shortlisted for the Booker Prize, and won the 1993 WH Smith Literary Award.

Paper Houses, a memoir of her life since 1970, was published in 2007: "Drawing on her diaries of the period, she brings back a more political, though also hedonistic era of radical feminism, communes and demonstrations. And the friendships she made and has kept ever since, notably with fellow feminist writers such as Sara Maitland, Micheline Wandor and Alison Fell. Roberts also self-analyzes the effects of her Anglo-French family’s Catholicism ('the nun in my head, that monstrous Mother Superior'), which have remained a fertile source, even as she reacted against its overt doctrines. Her exploration of London, the various areas and houses that she lived in, went alongside her development as a writer. For her, writing 'meant voyaging into the unknown and having adventures' though also 'bearing witness to other people’s stories as well as my own'."

In her 2020 work, Negative Capability: A Diary of Surviving, Roberts documents a period of crisis following the rejection of a novel she was writing by her publisher and agent. The title is taken from a quotation by Keats.

Roberts is an Emeritus Professor of Creative Writing at the University of East Anglia and was visiting professor in Writing at Nottingham Trent University for several years.

== Honours and recognition ==
Roberts was elected as a Fellow of the Royal Society of Literature in 1999. She is a Chevalier de l'Ordre des Arts et des Lettres, awarded by the French government, but turned down an OBE as a consequence of her republican views.

== Publications ==
=== Essays ===
- Food, Sex & God: on Inspiration and Writing, 1998, Virago Press

=== Novels ===
- A Piece of the Night, 1978, Women's Press
- The Visitation, 1983, Women's Press
- The Wild Girl (also known as The Secret Gospel of Mary Magdalene), 1984, Methuen
- The Book of Mrs Noah, 1987, Methuen
- In the Red Kitchen, 1990, Methuen
- Daughters of the House, 1992, Virago and Morrow (USA)
- Flesh & Blood, 1994, Virago
- Impossible Saints, 1998, Ecco Press
- Fair Exchange, 1999, Little, Brown
- The Looking Glass, 2000, Little, Brown
- The Mistressclass, 2002, Little, Brown
- Reader, I Married Him, 2006, Little, Brown
- Ignorance, 2012, Bloomsbury Publishing
- The Walworth Beauty, 2017, Bloomsbury
- Cut Out, 2021, Sandstone Press, ISBN 978-1913207472

=== Poetry ===
- Touch Papers: Three Women Poets (with Michelene Wandor and Judith Kazantzis), 1982, Allison and Busby
- The Mirror of the Mother, 1986, Methuen
- Psyche and the Hurricane , 1991, Methuen
- All the Selves I Was, 1995, Virago

=== Short stories ===
- Your Shoes, 1991
- During Mother's Absence, 1993, Virago
- How Maxine Learned to Love her Legs: And Other Short Stories, 1995, Aurora Metro Books
- Playing Sardines, 2001, Virago
- Mud: Stories of Sex and Love, 2010, Virago

=== Memoir ===
- Paper Houses: A Memoir of the 70s and Beyond, 2007, Virago, ISBN 978-1844084074; paperback 2008, ISBN 978-1844084081
- Negative Capability: A Diary of Surviving, 2020, Sandstone Press, ISBN 978-1913207144

== Bibliography ==
- Maria Soraya García-Sánchez: Travelling in Women's History with Michèle Roberts's Novels: Literature, Language and Culture. Bern: Lang, 2011, ISBN 978-3-0343-0627-0
- Susanne Gruss: The Pleasure of the Feminist Text: Reading Michèle Roberts and Angela Carter. Amsterdam: Rodopi, 2009, ISBN 978-90-420-2531-8
- Nick Rennison: Contemporary British Novelists. London: Routledge, Taylor & Francis, 2005, ISBN 0-415-21708-3, p. 137–140.
