= Red Dillard Morrison =

American mobster

"Red" Dillard Morrison Sr.
- Born: 1919; Alabama, U.S.
- Died: 1989 (aged 69–70)
- Other names: Red, Red Dillon
- Occupations: Drug trafficker, bootlegger, mob boss, pimp, extorter, and numbers runner
- Children: Dillard Morrison Jr.

Dillard Morrison Sr. (1919–1989) — known as "Red" Dillard — was an American mob boss and enforcer in New York City's Harlem neighborhood. Once called the "most dangerous man in the country" by federal law enforcement agents, Morrison's underworld résumé includes running a multimillion-dollar heroin ring, enforcing, pimping, extortion, and engaging in shootouts with rivals like Bumpy Johnson. A Robin Hood like figure in the Harlem community, Morrison's exploits with crime, women, and music are legendary. Though he would spend decades behind bars over the course of his life, Morrison was never convicted of murder.

== Biography ==
=== Early life ===
Born in Alabama in 1919, Morrison gained notoriety early for the use of violence while beating up bigger bullies of friends as a school-child. He picked up his nickname when he accidentally turned his hair red while trying to straighten it. As a teen in 1937 he migrated to New York by way of South Carolina to live with his mother who had come years before.

=== Criminal career ===
After deciding menial labor was not for him, Morrison quickly earned underworld credibility by robbing craps players and numbers runners in Harlem, growing into a bona fide gangster in the late 1930s. Before long, Morrison became a major force within the Harlem criminal world. His early criminal enterprises showed no shortage of ambition: disappointed with the take of one heist at Woolworth's, he immediately robbed a check-cashing shop. Even more than his appetite for illegal activity, it was Morrison's toughness that would become the stuff of legend. In one case, he was ambushed by a pair of assailants who shot him in the leg, but he turned around and chased the gunmen all the way back to their getaway car. Although he was always conservatively dressed, unobtrusive, and soft-spoken, Red had gained a fabled reputation of a man "not to be messed with."

Morrison came to the attention of the shot callers of that time, Women like "Mae," who ran the biggest brothel in town, and had a dozen shoplifters on her payroll. Men like "Big" Joe Richards, undisputed boss of the seaboard negro rackets.

"Big Joe" ruled varied crime "Kingdoms" with an iron hand, yet succeeded by remaining an anonymity to all but his "lieutenants" and a few select friends. He ran an efficient enterprise, with every man and woman trained and chosen to do a particular job. Eventually when Morrison was asked to become the right-hand man for Big Joe, he agreed. Due to his violent ways, Morrison was arrested for the first time and on April 29, 1940; he appeared in Special Sessions on the charge of 3rd degree assault, but the maimed, bandaged man who had filed the charges refused to testify. The court had no choice but to discharge Morrison on his own recognizance. The beaten man's reluctance to testify was the first indication of the "reign of terror' which was to follow.

On May 4, 1940, in Babylon, Long Island, Morrison received a suspended sentence on a 3rd degree assault charge. On June 4, 1940, in a Manhattan court, Morrison again drew a suspended sentence on a 3rd degree assault charge.

In the mid-1940s, Morrison split with Big Joe and began buying heroin wholesale from Italian mobster Lucky Luciano, who imported it from Turkey via Sicily. Morrison then handed off the product to drug runners who resold it in points further south and west of New York. Morrison also worked as a pimp and earned a reputation as both a dashing ladies' man and a philanderer. Then for three years he had no problems with the law. He learned to intimidate victims so well that many of the assaults credited to him never reached the police. He learned a lot of other things too, as the record will show.

- On October 6, 1943, a charge of armed robbery was dismissed against him in Felony Court.
- On July 24, 1944, he drew his first "time", a 1-year sentence and costs for the possession of narcotics (marijuana) in North Bergen, New Jersey. He served 'six months on the County Farm.
- On July 2, 1945, a felonious assault charge was dismissed against him in Felony Court.
- On March 31. 1946, Morrison drew "$35 or 20 days" for disorderly conduct (shooting dice). He paid the fine.
- On April 5, 1946 Dillard Morrison, 26, was charged with driving after his license had been revoked. A fine of $50 was imposed.
- On April 29, 1946, a felonious assault charge against him was discharged in Felony Court
- On November 18, 1946, a gambling charge drew a $100 fine.
- On January 18, 1947 a charge of grand larceny was dismissed against him in Felony Court .
- On April 11, 1947 a new charge of compulsory prostitution was added to the familiar felonious assault charges which had been filed against him but all charges were dismissed in Felony Court.
- On December 3, 1947, two minor raps cost him 20 days when he was convicted on two charges of reckless driving in Traffic Court.
- On Dec. 21st, 1948, he was arrested, and released on bail, on a felonious assault charge (knife).

Although an assistant district attorney called him "notorious" and a magistrate refused him bail because of his record, Morrison was released again when he appeared in court to face two charges. The assistant DA's charge that Morrison was a "pimp" was given somewhat credence when, as he left the hearing, Morrison was immediately followed from the premises by some 15 women. Morrison was already due in Felony Court along with Louis (Fees) Taylor and (Bumpy) Johnson for a hearing on felonious charges filed against all three for an earlier stabbing. "This man has had many cases in this court, where the witnesses or complainants fail to appear. It is felt that if he is released he may intimidate other witnesses", Assistant District Attorney Paul Reilly said. Magistrate Samuel Orr then refused bail but Morrison's attorney, Matthew H. Brandenberg, went before General Sessions Judge Jacob G. Schurman and asked for bail. The latter released Morrison on $2,500 bail.

"Red Gets Bail" was an expected headline in the 1940s & 1950s, the release of the dangerous redhead would regularly electrify Harlem. This pattern of arrests and subsequent dismissals is typical of the early days of any prominent mobster. Few Negroes, however, ever achieved the "distinction" of being identified in that class. At all times Morrison's hands were clean, and had it not been for his code of violence, he would have remained as unobtrusive as the many who have grown fat and respectable from the profits of the lucrative dope trade. His exploits put him in the spotlight, in the eyes of the people, and because of this his most secret operations became public property also.

=== 1950 drug conviction ===
As Morrison's business grew, so too did his profile. His name began to turn up in local newspapers, both for the opulent parties he threw–and for his criminal activities.

On April 10, 1949 Morrison was arrested after he allegedly fired four shots through the door and window of Sheps Bar and Grill, 303 W. 146th St. It has never been established at whom he was shooting.

In their last ditch effort to capture the elusive Morrison, the authorities imported a young wise agent from the midwest to work himself into the web of Harlem narcotics operations.

On May 4, 1950, Morrison was arrested by federal officers along with Robert "Gator" Lee and a white woman on charges of possession and sale of narcotics. Morrison was sentenced to five years in prison. The arrests came after Morrison allegedly delivered a half ounce package of heroin to Lee. Morrison and Lee both pleaded not guilty in Federal Court to three counts of "unlawful sale of heroin" and was said to be the Harlem contact source for heroin which was being smuggled into the United States from Turkey. At the time Garland H. Williams, district supervisor of the U.S. Bureau of Narcotics, said "they are probably the most notorious narcotics dealers in this part of the United States. They have supplied a large percentage of dope distributed from Boston to Chicago." The amount of narcotics found in possession was relatively small. "However," he charged that "the men have been selling huge amounts for a long time". Bail was made at $10,000.

=== Release from prison ===
Morrison returned in 1955 with promises of going straight. Paralyzed in both legs due to prison fight in 1953, it was obvious right away that he didn't lose a step. When two mafiosos showed up at his house with a brand-new red Cadillac El Dorado for him–a token of gratitude for not "snitching" on them in prison, he respectfully declined. He eyed the real estate business and considered opening a dry cleaning shop. But months after his return, another event shook him from his path: the sudden death of his wife at age 33 of an allergic reaction to a penicillin injection.

Trying to cope with the death of his wife, he spent his nights at clubs like Birdland, Savoy, and Minton's . During this time, Morrison grew increasingly fond of cocaine, and his behavior became erratic. There were more shootouts, bar brawls, and a drug deal set up by a federal agent that landed him back in jail for ten more years. Once again, his musical friends stood by him. Billy Eckstein and Sarah Vaughan even visited and performed for him at Otisville.

Released in 1974, Morrison moved to Los Angeles and continued his life as a drug dealer even as he approached his 60th birthday. Still, he maintained his support for musicians. Ernie Andrews remembers Morrison sending money to help pay for the funeral of Sonny Payne, a drummer who played with Harry James and Count Basie. "Red sent me $1000," says Andrews. "He was that kind of a guy."

By 1979, Morrison was back in jail for the last time, after a girlfriend testified against him and he was convicted of drug charges.

=== Personal life ===
He was in a relationship with Carrole Drake, wife of Billy Eckstine, and with singer Etta James.

=== Death ===
He died of bladder cancer in prison in 1989.

== In popular culture ==
=== Books ===
- Harlem Godfather – The Rap on My Husband, Ellsworth "Bumpy" Johnson, by Mayme Hatcher Johnson
- Meet Me at the Theresa: The Story of Harlem's Most Famous Hotel, by Sondra K. Wilson
