= Tenderloin district =

Tenderloin district may refer to:

- Tenderloin, Manhattan
- Tenderloin, San Francisco

== See also ==
- Tenderloin
