= Hearty White =

American singer-songwriter

David Morris
- Morris performing as Hearty White in 2019

Background information
- Born: January 3, 1964 (age 62)
- Origin: Bermuda
- Genre: Alternative rock
- Instruments: Vocals, bass guitar
- Years active: 1987–present
- Label: Manufacture Sound Output

David Morris (born January 3, 1964), known professionally as Hearty White, is a radio host and musician who is best known as the frontman for Cold Water Army, and his band Bag We Bag. Morris, who was born in Bermuda, is also the creator of two radio personalities, Lee Harvey and Hearty White.

The Hearty White Radio Show, also known as the Miracle Nutrition Hour, aired weekly on WVFS on Tuesday nights at 9 p.m. EST in Tallahassee, Florida, for years.

On June 12, 2012, the "Hearty White" persona came out of retirement and resumed his show on WFMU. It is called Miracle Nutrition with Hearty White and aired on Thursdays for 14 years. The last show was June 4, 2026.

On Record Store Day April 20, 2013, the band MGMT released the Alien Days cassette single with Side B by Morris, entitled "Message 7 from Hearty White".

In November 2014, Morris, in his Hearty White persona, filmed a series of station identification clips for Cartoon Network's Adult Swim adult-oriented nighttime programming block of programming.
