= Mike Rogers (producer) =

Director and radio host (born 1956)

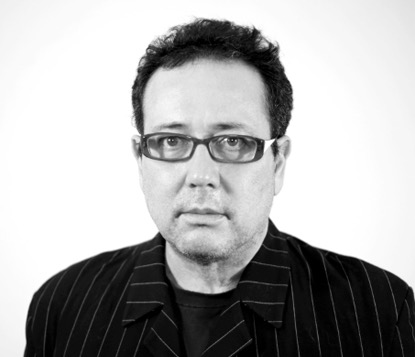
- Born: November 1, 1956 (age 69)
- Occupations: Radio host, producer
- Years active: 1977–present
- Website: modernmarketingjapan.blogspot.jp

Mike Rogers (sometimes referred to as Mike "in Tokyo" Rogers) is a director, producer, and radio host. In 2006, he became the first foreigner in Japanese history to hold a senior position at a major Japanese broadcasting station, when he was appointed as a program director, then general manager at TV Tokyo's InterFM channel. Currently, he hosts the "Mike Rogers Show" internationally. The program previously broadcast exclusively on InterFM channel in Tokyo and on Radio Neo in Nagoya, Japan. He was also a director and co-host of InterFM's weekday morning program "Good Morning Garage". He currently hosts two programs at Love FM 76.1 Kyushu and three regular weekly programs at WFMU in New York.

Rogers has been a radio/TV host/producer in Japan since 1983. He is also the writer, producer, and co-director of the 2017 feature film, Ghostroads – A Japanese Rock N Roll Ghost Story which premiered at the Raindance Film Festival 2017. He is a founding member of the Mt. Fuji Film & VR Festival. He was the lead singer of the Los Angeles punk band The Rotters between 1977 and 1979 under the pseudonym "Nigel Nitro".

Rogers was a Jury member for the 2018 Raindance Film Festival in London, England. He is the first person from Japan to be given a seat on the Jury in the history of the Raindance Film Festival. Rogers also won an award for his film "Matsuchiyo – Life of a Geisha" at the Raindance Film Festival in London, 2018.

Rogers is also the co-writer for the film Meet the Pumps directed by Stephen David Brooks with musical score by Linda Perry.

Rogers is also a DJ at WFMU "Sheena's Jungle Room" in New Jersey.

Rogers is the founder and program director at the JIFF Japan Indies Film Awards and the Japan Ninja Indies Music Awards show, which is the first international indies music awards show from Tokyo.

== Career ==
=== Producer/director ===
- Ghostroads – A Japanese Rock N Roll Ghost Story.
- Director/Producer of Matsuchiyo – Life of a Geisha.

=== Radio host ===
- Mike Rogers Show on InterFM in Tokyo and Radio Neo in Nagoya, Japan. The program is also aired nationally on Radiko.jp
- Mike Rogers Show and Color Red Radio with Mike Rogers on Love FM 76.1 in Kyushu, Japan.
- Mike Rogers Show on air in 19 nations (internet) and 39 stations worldwide.
- Mike Rogers on Mike Rogers Show, Color Red Radio, Sounds From Space WFMU Sheena's Jungle Room.

=== Music ===
- Lead singer of Los Angeles punk band The Rotters (1977~1979)
