= Federal Correctional Institution, Otisville =

Medium-security prison in New York State, US

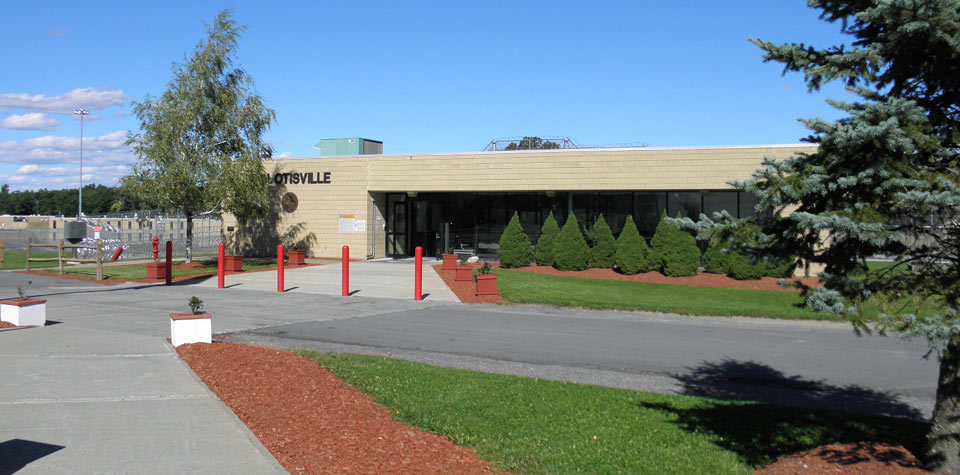
- Interactive map of Federal Correctional Institution, Otisville
- Location: Town of Mount Hope, Orange County, near Otisville, New York; 41°29′47″N 74°31′38″W
- Status: Operational
- Security class: Medium-security (with minimum-security prison camp)
- Population: 584 (60 in prison camp)
- Opened: 1977
- Managed by: Federal Bureau of Prisons
- Warden: J. L. Jamison

The Federal Correctional Institution, Otisville (FCI Otisville) is a medium-security United States federal prison for male inmates located near Otisville, New York. It is operated by the Federal Bureau of Prisons (BOP), a division of the United States Department of Justice. It also includes a satellite prison camp for minimum-security male offenders.

== Location ==
FCI Otisville is located in southeastern New York State, near the Pennsylvania and New Jersey borders, and 70 miles (110 km) northwest of New York City. It is 1/4 mile (400 m) from the Otisville Correctional Facility, a medium-security state prison. It is 22 miles (35 km) from Monticello, New York, 28 miles (45 km) from Kiryas Joel, and 51 miles (82 km) from Monsey.

== Notable incidents ==
On August 11, 2009, former correction officer Hope Spinato (assigned to FCI Otisville) was sentenced to eight months in prison after pleading guilty to aiding and assisting an inmate serving a 17-year drug trafficking sentence, in briefly escaping the facility. An investigation by the Federal Bureau of Investigation found that Spinato became involved in a relationship with the inmate (not identified by the Bureau of Prisons) and drove the inmate between the facility and her home, on several occasions.

== In popular culture ==
George Jung, the basis for the 2001 film Blow, served time at FCI Otisville, but was later transferred to the Federal Correctional Institution in Fort Dix, New Jersey, before being released in 2014.

In the Spike Lee film 25th Hour, the protagonist Montgomery "Monty" Brogan spends his final day commiserating with friends and family before reporting to Otisville for a seven-year sentence.

In the opening of the 2010, film Wall Street: Money Never Sleeps, the sequel to the 1987 film Wall Street, Gordon Gekko, played by Michael Douglas, is released after serving an eight-year sentence for insider trading and securities fraud for his actions as a corporate raider in the first movie. Although the scene was actually shot at Sing Sing state prison, Gekko mentions in the film that he served his sentence at FCI Otisville.

In The Mindy Project, nurse Morgan refers to his time in Otisville for the theft of cars with his cousin.

In 2019, Mike "The Situation" Sorrentino, who is famous from the MTV show Jersey Shore, was sentenced to eight months for tax fraud.

In the 7th season’s second episode of Billions, the prison is featured as the place where former New York Attorney General and United States Attorney for the Southern District of New York Chuck Rhoades visits former US Attorney General Jock Jeffcoat, who is incarcerated there.

In Season 3 Episode 4 of Succession, Tom Wambsgans mentions Otisville as "the Jewish jail" while looking through a list of prisons where he will potentially be incarcerated.

== Jewish demographics ==
Aleph Institute's prison outreach director, Rabbi Menachem Katz, stated that the BOP is "unofficially designated it to meet the needs of Orthodox Jews" due to the proximity to the Jewish population of New York City. Circa 2008 the warden of the prison stated 58 prisoners were Jewish, while Jewish Prisoner Services International chairman Gary Friedman stated that about 120 prisoners were Jewish. FCI Otisville offers Passover Seders, done in the prison cafeteria. Until other prisons began offering seders, prisoners at those institutions took buses to Otisville to partake in seders. Peter Hyman of New York magazine wrote "Otisville still offers one of the more traditional Seders in the prison system." Religious Jewish inmates request assignment to FCI Otisville for these reasons.

== Notable inmates (current and former) ==
=== Current ===
Inmate Name	Register Number	Photo	Status	Details
Deryl Dedmon	16507-043		Serving a 50 year sentence; scheduled for release in 2054. Currently at FCI Marianna.	Pleaded guilty in 2012 for hate crime stabbing an African American to death
Eric Hafner	00932-005		Serving a 20-year sentence; scheduled for release in 2036.	Known as a perennial candidate, standing for United States House of Representatives elections in various states. Convicted of threatening to kill or injure elected officials, police officers, lawyers, judges, and their families, trying to extort $350,000, and making bomb threats to an elected official's office, a county courthouse, a police department, two law firms, and a commercial establishment.
Darren Mallory Sharper	34209-034		Serving a sentence of 20 years; scheduled for release in 2028. Currently at FCI Miami.	Sentenced to 20 years after pleading guilty to multiple rape and drug-related charges

=== Former ===
Inmate Name	Register Number	Photo	Status	Details
Zvonko Bušić†	03941-158		Released from custody in 2008 after serving 32 years.	Member of a terrorist group seeking Croatian independence from Yugoslavia; planted a bomb at Grand Central Terminal in New York City that killed NYPD officer Brian Murray and hijacked TWA Flight 355 in 1976; briefly escaped from FCI Otisville in 1987.
Michael Cohen	86067-054		Sentenced to two years. Was released in May 2020 on a prison furlough due to the ongoing COVID-19 pandemic. In July 2020, Cohen was taken back into custody after refusing to comply with a term of his release, and sent back to Otisville. Federal District Court Judge Alvin Hellerstein ordered Cohen's release later in July, citing the government's attempt to suppress publication of Cohen's forthcoming book.	Former Trump Organization lawyer. Pled guilty in 2018 to tax evasion, making false statements to a financial institution, willfully causing an unlawful corporate contribution, an excessive campaign contribution, and making false statements to a congressional committee.
Walter Forbes	23905-050		Served a 12-year sentence; released in 2018.	Former Chairman of Cendant Corporation convicted in 2007 of conspiracy to commit securities fraud and making false statements for masterminding the largest accounting fraud of the 1990s; Forbes was also ordered to pay $3.275 billion in restitution.
Douglas Hodge	01457-138		Served a 9-month sentence; released in March 2021.	Former CEO of Pacific Investment Management Company (PIMCO), the world's largest bond manager. Pled guilty in October 2019 to conspiring to commit fraud and money laundering.
Billy McFarland	91186-054		Released on August 30, 2022.	Sentenced to 6 years in October 2018 after pleading guilty to two counts of wire fraud amounting to more than $26 million that occurred during his promotion of the fraudulent Fyre Festival music festival.
Sholom Rubashkin	10755-029		Originally sentenced in 2010 to a 27-year sentence. Released in December 2017 per a presidential commutation.	Former CEO of Agriprocessors, once the largest kosher slaughterhouse in the United States; convicted of fraud for deceiving his lender, First Bank Business Capital, to receive loans totaling $26 million.
Sheldon Silver	71915-054		Served a sentence of 6 years and 6 months; furloughed in May 2021 until his death in January 2022.	Former Speaker of the New York State Assembly for 21 years convicted of money laundering.
Michele Sindona	00450-054		Originally sentenced to 25 years in June 1980 but extradited on September 25, 1984, to Italy to face murder charge	Sicilian banker and Propaganda Due boss with clear connections to the Mafia. Following the failure of the Franklin National Bank, was sentenced on 65 counts of fraud, perjury, false bank statements and misappropriation of $45,000,000 in bank funds. Was sentenced to life imprisonment in Italy in 1986 on charge of murdering lawyer Giorgio Ambrosoli but committed suicide four days subsequently.
Dean Skelos	72196-054		Released on January 13, 2022.	Former Majority Leader of the New York State Senate convicted of public corruption.
Michael "The Situation" Sorrentino	66910-050		Served a sentence of 8 months; released September 2019.	Sentenced to 8 months in prison after pleading guilty to tax fraud in October 2018
Kenneth I. Starr	63552-054		Served a 7-year sentence; released in 2016.	Former financial adviser for Al Pacino, Martin Scorsese and Sylvester Stallone, pleaded guilty in 2010 to fraud and money laundering for diverting $33 million of his clients' money to pay for personal expenses.
Sholam Weiss	32610-054		Served a sentence of 835 years, earliest possible release November 13, 2754. Sentence commuted to time served on January 20, 2021, by President Donald Trump	Convicted in 2000 of fraud, racketeering and money laundering.
Chuck Zito	12032-054		Served the final portion of a ten-year drug conspiracy sentence at FCI Otisville before his release from federal custody on April 13, 1990	President of the New York Nomads chapter of the Hells Angels; pleaded guilty to conspiracy to distribute methamphetamine in 1986

== See also ==
- List of United States federal prisons
- Federal Bureau of Prisons
- Incarceration in the United States
