= Otisville Correctional Facility =

Medium-security state prison located in New York, US

Coordinates: 41°29′16″N 74°31′29″W

- Interactive map of Otisville Correctional Facility
- Location: 57 Sanitorium Avenue Otisville, New York
- Status: open
- Security class: medium
- Capacity: 700
- Opened: 1976
- Managed by: New York State Department of Corrections and Community Supervision

Otisville Correctional Facility is a medium-security state prison located in Orange County, New York, United States. It is located adjacent to the federal system prison (Federal Correctional Institution, Otisville), but each facility operates separately from the other and they are otherwise unrelated. Both are in the Town of Mount Hope.

The site was used as a tuberculosis sanitarium (1906–1955), a Division of Youth facility (Otisville Training Facility, up to 1972), and briefly a drug treatment center, before it became a state prison. A sawmill for lumber and maple syrup production were soon introduced for prisoner work. Due to the length of the prison fence and rough terrain, exterior guards are mounted on horses.

== Notable inmates ==
- James Ida ("Little Guy"), mobster and former consigliere of the Genovese crime family
- Sean Ludwick, convicted of vehicular homicide
- Red Dillard Morrison, mob boss and enforcer
