= Wildgirl =

Artist and DJ

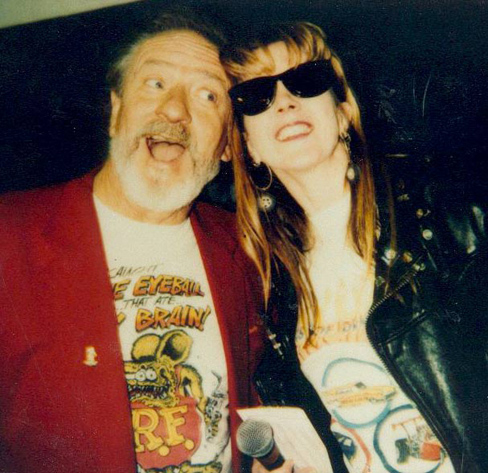
- A photo of Ed "Big Daddy" Roth and Wildgirl on April 27, 1991
- Born: Ericka Peterson

Ericka Peterson, known professionally as Wildgirl, is an artist and former WFMU DJ. Through the late 1980s and early '90s, her Saturday night radio show Wildgirl's Rockin' Racing and her Wildgirl's Go-Go-Rama live shows at the Coney Island Sideshow are credited with giving birth to the go-go and burlesque revivals.

In the mid-1980s, she began performing under the name "Wildgirl", and in 1986 also assisted in the reopening of the Coney Island sideshow, performing for a season as Serpentina, snake handler and contortionist. In 1987 she produced the first Wildgirl's Go-Go-Rama at the Sideshow by the Seashore.

In 1996, filmmakers Addison Cook and Annie Ballard produced Wildgirl's Go-Go-Rama, a documentary on the last Coney Island show, which won several awards, including best documentary at the Chicago Underground Film Festival.
