= Tenderloin =

Tenderloin may refer to:

== Food ==
- Beef tenderloin
- Pork tenderloin

== Neighborhoods ==
- Tenderloin, Manhattan
- Tenderloin, San Francisco

== Entertainment ==
- Tenderloin (film), a 1928 film
- Tenderloin (musical), a musical from 1960
- Tenderloin (novel), by Samuel Hopkins Adams
- "Tenderloin", a song by Blue Öyster Cult from Agents of Fortune, 1976
- "Tenderloin", a song by Rancid from Let's Go
- The Tenderloins, an American improv comedy troupe, creators of Impractical Jokers

== See also ==
- Tenderloin district
