= Ghostroads – A Japanese Rock N Roll Ghost Story =

2017 comedy film

- Theatrical release poster
- Directed by: Enrico Ciccu; Ken Nishikawa; Les Decidous; Mike in Tokyo Rogers
- Written by: Mike in Tokyo Rogers; James Honeycutt
- Produced by: Mike in Tokyo Rogers
- Starring: Mr. Pan; Kansas Bowling; Darrell Harris
- Cinematography: Les Deciduous
- Edited by: Ken Nishikawa
- Music by: Various artists; Ken Nishikawa
- Production company: Robot55
- Distributed by: King Records Japan
- Release date: September 30, 2017
- Running time: 78 minutes
- Country: Japan
- Languages: English; Japanese

Ghostroads – A Japanese Rock N Roll Ghost Story is a 2017 Japanese rock n roll comedy film conceived and produced by Mike "in Tokyo" Rogers and written by Rogers and James Honeycutt. It was directed by Enrico Ciccu and co-produced and edited by Ken Nishikawa. It stars Japanese Rock musicians Mr. Pan of The Neatbeats, Tatsuji Nobuhara of the Privates, Danny of the 50 Kaitenz, Darrell Harris, Los Angeles cultural icon and radio DJ Rodney Bingenheimer, and American filmmaker Kansas Bowling.

Ghostroads – A Japanese Rock N Roll Ghost Story received widespread acclaim, and enjoyed its World Premiere at the 25th Annual Raindance Film Festival in London in 2017. It also enjoyed nationwide theatrical release in Japan through King Records.
