= Siir =

Siir or spelling variations thereof may refer to:

- Refik Osman Top (1897–1957), nicknamed Şiir, Turkish footballer, referee, coach and sports columnist
- Şiir Eloğlu (born 1965), Turkish-German actress
- Johannes Siir (1889–1941), Estonian colonel and sport shooter
- Sa'ir, also spelled Si'ir, a village in the State of Palestine
