= Sır Dam =

- Location within Turkey
- Official name: Sır Baraji
- Country: Turkey
- Location: Kahramanmaraş Province
- Coordinates: 37°30′2.9″N 36°35′45.35″E
- Status: Operational
- Construction began: 1987
- Opening date: 1991

Dam and spillways
- Type of dam: Concrete arch
- Height: 116 m (381 ft)
- Dam volume: 494,000 m^{3} (646,128 cu yd)

Reservoir
- Total capacity: 1,120,000,000 m^{3} (907,999 acre⋅ft)
- Surface area: 48 km^{2} (19 mi^{2})

Power Station
- Type: Conventional
- Turbines: 3 x 95 MW Francis-type
- Installed capacity: 285 MW
- Annual generation: 725 GWh

The Sır Dam is an arch dam on the Ceyhan River in Kahramanmaraş Province of southern Turkey. There is a hydroelectric power plant, established in 1991, at the dam, with a power output of 285 MW.

== Involuntary Resettlement ==
According to Terminski (2013), the construction of the dam resulted in involuntary resettlement of approximately 45,000 people.
