= Sons In Retirement =

California social welfare organization for seniors

SIR Inc.
- Sons In Retirement
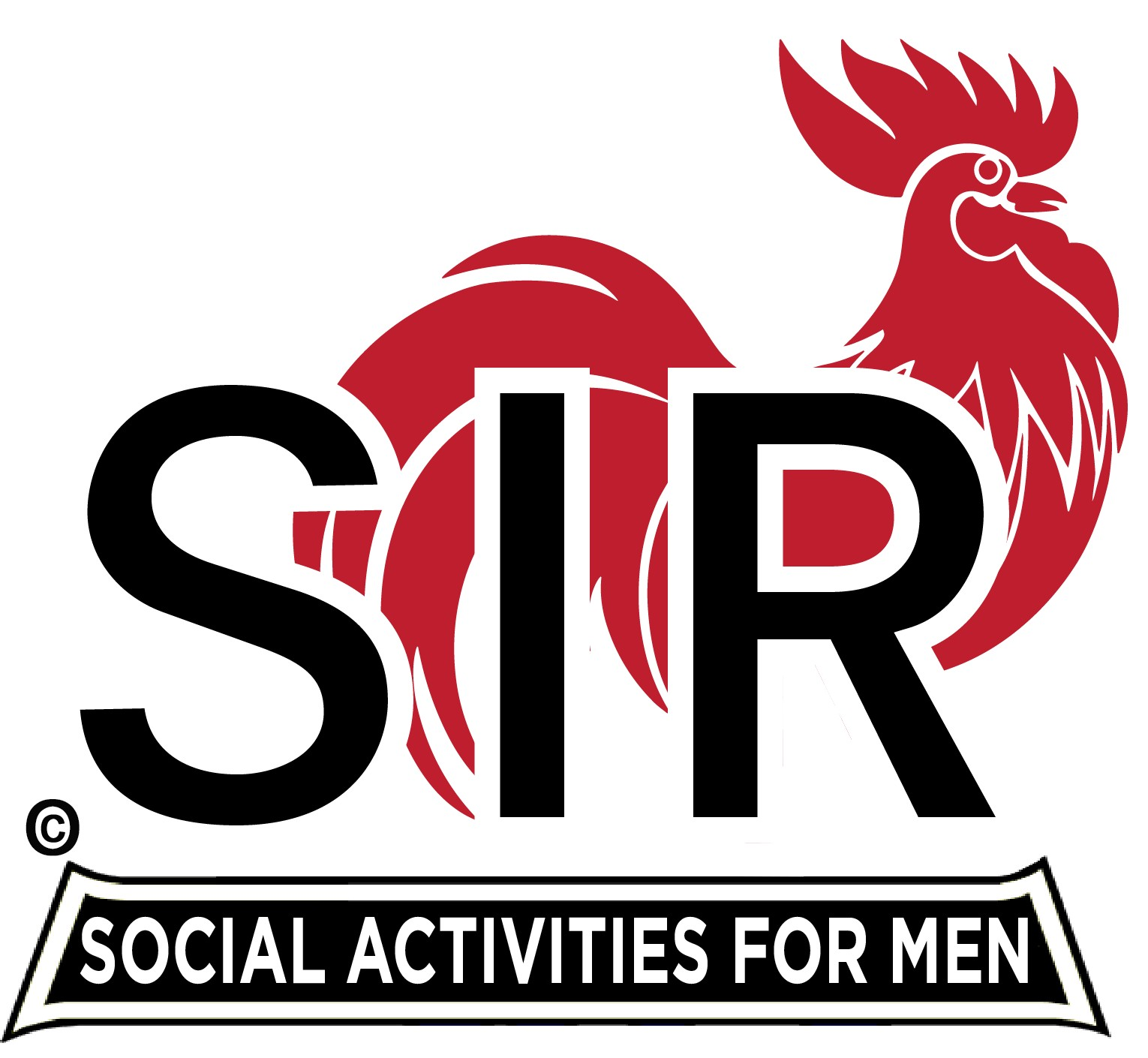
- Formation: 1958; 68 years ago
- Founder: Damian L. Reynolds
- Type: Public-benefit nonprofit corporation
- Legal status: 501(c)(4)
- Purpose: Welfare for retired and Senior men
- Location: California, United States
- Region served: Northern California and Central California
- Services: Social activities and events, such as golf, hiking, biking and lunches
- Members: 91 clubs with 10,000 members (2023)
- Funding: Voluntary contributions to cover costs
- Website: sirinc.org

SIR, formerly Sons In Retirement, is an American social welfare organization for senior men based in California. It has about 91 branches and 10,000 members in Northern California and Central California.

== History ==
SIR Inc. was originally founded for retired men. Today, Senior men of all ages are welcomed, whether they are retired or not. By 2013, SIR had about 84 branches and 8,600 members in Northern California and Central California. SIR was founded in San Mateo, California, in 1958 and subsequently incorporated as a 5501(c)(4) public-benefit nonprofit corporation.

In February 2019, by a vote by the State Board of Directors, it was passed that the word SIR be adopted and used as a pronoun within the Branch membership and in public use.

The network chose the rooster as the hallmark of the SIR logo.
