= New Stage =

- Created by: Dianne Victor
- Directed by: Joshua David Evans
- Starring: Mike "The Situation" Sorrentino; Dom Chizzoniti; Ashley Gerke; Ben Green; Mykell
- Country of origin: United States
- Original language: English
- No. of episodes: 13

Production
- Producer: YOBI.tv

Original release
- Release: September 27 – December 20, 2011

New Stage is a 2011 web series starring Mike "The Situation" Sorrentino as Angel Adonis, a hip-hop star and the lead judge on a reality television singing competition. Directed by Joshua David Evans and produced by YOBI.tv, the series follows Producer Frank Rossi (Dom Chizzoniti) as he works to placate his judges, Angel-A (Sorrentino), Lola Lathers (Ashley Gerke) and Rufus Middleton (Ben Green), cast and crew to ensure the show's success. Sorrentino is surrounded by winners of the YOBI.tv talent contests.

In the New Stage cast are YOBIAct winners Dom Chizzoniti and Ashley Gerke; YOBILaugh winners Ben Green, Albion Gray, and Kandyce Gabrielsen; YOBISing winners Mykell, Gregory Douglass, Meggan Archey, and Tebby Phyllise; and YOBIPics winner Abrey Adams. New Stage crew members include YOBIFilm winners David Kilgo, James Domroe, and Justin Patten; and YOBIPics winners Abrey Adams, Bruce Peerson, and Paul Blackburn.

== Production ==
New Stage was filmed in early September 2011 at the Wharton Center on the campus of Michigan State University.

Alternate Endings

The ending of the series was shot three different ways—once with each of the three featured musicians winning the New Stage competition—so that viewer votes could determine the ending of the series. As a result of those votes, Gregory Douglass edged out Meggan Archey and Tebby Phyllise, and was named the winner of New Stage as well as the winner of the June 2011 YOBISing Mini-Contest.

== Episodes ==
Episode 1 - Culture Shock

English talent show creators Rufus and James get a wake-up call from Frank Rossi and hip-hop star Angel A. It appears that America has a different way of doing things.
Release date, 27 September 2011

Episode 2 - Funny Business

New Stage starts pre-production in East Lansing, MI. Uneasy with the changes, James tries to play by Frank's rules, while Rufus has his sights set on Angel's girlfriend and the show's third judge, Lola.
Release date, 4 October 2011

Episode 3 - Identity Crisis

Rufus discovers a new side of himself when the Official Situation clothing line becomes a sponsor of New Stage. During music rehearsals for the show, the contestants prove to be a handful for the host, Mykell.
Release date, 11 October 2011

Episode 4 - Sticky Situations

Rufus is confused when he begins receiving unprompted attention from women on set. Angel's demanding work schedule has a negative effect on his relationship with Lola.
Release date, 18 October 2011

Episode 5 - Behind Closed Doors

Contestants prepare for eliminations, and the talent competition picks up steam. Rufus has some unconventional promotional ideas, while Frank and James are focused on more serious business.
Release date, 25 October 2011

Episode 6 - Top Five

The talent competition judges and producers celebrate the continued success of the show. Lola seeks comfort in her friendship with Rufus after she has a falling out with Angel.
Release date, 1 November 2011

Episode 7 - Photo Shoot

A guest photographer joins the remaining five contestants for an exclusive behind-the-scenes photo shoot. The shoot becomes awkward when Angel and Lola are forced into proximity during the judges' photo session.
Release date, 8 November 2011

Episode 8 - Public Relations

The judges and producers hold a meeting to review audience feedback and marketing strategies for the show. Frank and Kandy keep the five remaining contestants busy with an intense day of EPK filming.
Release date, 15 November 2011

Episode 9 - British Charm

Rufus and James are pleased to learn that Rufus has become a hit with the show's fans, and their excitement don't go unnoticed by Angel. The remaining contestants face another elimination round.
Release date, 22 November 2011

Episode 10 - Cause for Concern

Angel receives more attention than usual when he returns to the set after an unexplained trip out-of-town. The top three contestants undergo extended rehearsals to prepare for their upcoming final performances.
Release date, 29 November 2011

Episode 11 - Trepidation

Frank holds a meeting with the show's top three finalists to discuss their future in the music business. Rufus takes extreme precaution to keep himself safe from a lurking stalker.
Release date, 6 December 2011

Episode 12 - Rumours

Rufus looks to Angel's bodyguard, Sir Loin, to keep him safe from his stalker, Tabitha. The show's top three finalists face an elimination round. The judges and producers experience a tense meeting when they confront several rumours that have been circling.
Release date, 13 December 2011

Episode 13 - Finale

The two remaining contestants have reached the final elimination round. The successful first season comes to a close, but it opens up several discussions regarding the future for the careers of Angel, Lola, Rufus, James, Frank, and Mykell.
Release date, 20 December 2011

== Soundtrack ==
The New Stage soundtrack was released on 19 September 2011. Both volumes feature winners of the YOBISing contest and other musicians from the New Stage cast.

Volume 1

- "New Stage" by Mykell
- "My Life" by Mykell
- "Hope is You" by Mykell
- "Hang Around" by Gregory Douglass
- "Naysayer" by Gregory Douglass
- "Inspired" by Gregory Douglass
- "Endless Insane" by Meggan Archey
- "Worth the Wait" by Tebby Burrows
- "Here’s to You" by Tebby Burrows
- "Bye Bye" by Stryve
- "Bowties" by Tyler Howe

Volume 2

- "Woozy" by Mykell
- "Perfect Love" by Mykell
- "My Heart" by Mykell
- "Wild" by Gregory Douglass
- "I Wanted to Run" by Gregory Douglass
- "Another Point of View" by Meggan Archey
- "Simplify" by Meggan Archey
- "Twisted Wishes" by Tebby Burrows
- "Summer Time" by Tebby Burrows
- "Pretty Girls" by Stryve
- "Flight" by Tyler Howe

== Crew ==
- Producers: Dianne Victor, executive producer; Danielle Ryan, assistant producer
- Cinematography by Peter Johnston
- Film editing by Jessica Grabowski
- Makeup: Katelyn Deck and Michaela Thornburg, makeup artist
- Second Unit first assistant director: Randy Holloway,
- Ben Rickert, production sound mixer
- Abrey Adams, still photographer
- Paul Blackburn, still photographer
- James Domroe, camera operator
- Chris Ford, camera operator
- David Kilgo, camera operator
- Justin Patten, first assistant camera
- Bruce Peerson, still photographer
- Danielle Ryan, wardrobe supervisor
- Joshua David Evans, assistant editor
- Randy Holloway, additional editor
- Jen O'Meara, production assistant
- Jerry O'Meara, production assistant
- Danielle Ryan, talent coordinator
