= Cold Water Army (rock band) =

American rock band

- Origin: Tallahassee, Florida, United States
- Genres: Pop Music; Disco; R&B/soul music Punk rock Funk rock
- Years active: 1988–1995, 2011
- Label: Manufacture Sound Output Co.

Cold Water Army was an American rock band that existed for several years in Tallahassee, Florida, and broke up over the summer of 1995. The band had two recordings that were released, the first a cassette-only release entitled Eliot Ness, and the second (released by Manufacture Sound Output Company on cassette and compact disc) entitled Cold Water Army. The second release was remastered in 2007, and is available on iTunes. The band's sound combined elements of disco, punk rock, funk rock, pop and big harmonies.

== Formation ==
Lead Singer David Morris (a.k.a. Man Baby) was initially in a band called 'Das Bellows,' which broke up after playing a party for the Florida Flambeau, a student newspaper. He met the editorial staff of the paper at that party, who, coincidentally, were all musicians. Cold Water Army formed, essentially, to fill in at the last minute for a Das Bellows gig, since Bellows had broken up and clearly weren't going to be able to play the show.

Thus Cold Water Army, or "CWA" were formed. They usually got done with working on the paper around 10 or 11 at night, and then they and David would practice until two in the morning, fueled by beer, thus explaining the ironic origin of their name. (The original Cold Water Army was a temperance movement, back in the days before prohibition.) Also, the size of the band lent itself to the 'army' designation.

== Members ==
According to the group's guitarist Steve MacQueen, the original members of the band in those days were:

- David Morris (a.k.a. Man Baby) (Bass, Vocals);
- Pete Butler (Drums);
- Steve MacQueen (Rhythm Guitar);
- Kati Kairies-Schardl (Backing Vocals);
- Jim Richardson (Lead Guitar);
- Heidi Altman (Backing Vocals).

Though the band would go through many different lineups, Morris, Butler, MacQueen, and Kairies-Schardl would form the core of every subsequent incarnation of the band. In 1989, Richardson and Altman left the band, and were replaced by

- Jen Kermeen (vocals – her cover of the Jackson 5's "I Want You Back" was a longtime show stopper.);
- Paul Barnes (Lead Guitar);
- Kim MacQueen (Backing Vocals, and Steve's wife.) Then, in 1991, Paul left the band and was replaced by
- Kevin Alexander (Lead Guitar).

It was this version that recorded their lone album.

== Influences ==
Cold Water Army was influenced by Camper Van Beethoven, Glass Eye, They Might Be Giants, the B-52s, Oingo Boingo, Talking Heads, Jackson 5 and Motown. Cold Water Army was known for having elaborate stage shows, with mock fist-fights between members, including surprise appearances by Jeff Lynne's even-more-evil twin.

== History ==
Cold Water Army's performances included:

- Showcase in Austin, Texas at the South By Southwest Music Festival in 1989
- Show at the Warehouse with the Wild Seeds in 1989
- Halloween Bash in 1989 attended by the members of Pylon and R.E.M. who were playing at the Leon County Civic Center the following night.
- Show in Auburn, Alabama in 1990. The promoter for the show was a teenager named Brian Teasley, who went on to play drums in Man or Astroman as Birdstuff, and is the current percussionist for Polyphonic Spree.
- Show with Dick Dale at the Cow Haus. Cold Water Army had to play an extended set because Dick Dale refused to come out until he found his special feather, which had been blessed by a Shaman.
- Show with The Lemonheads in 1990
- Show at the Warehouse with Dumptruck in 1990
- Multiple shows between 1989 - 1993 with the Swimming Pool Qs
- Multiple shows between 1989 - 1993 with Glass Eye

As listed in the liner notes, the members of the band were:

Kevin Alexander (Lead Guitar), Paul Barnes (At this point an ex-member, but he came back to play session guitar on Marty, Love Balm, and Dicksie), Pete Butler, Ann Fleet (Played Flute on 'Ann B. Davis' and gave the scream at the beginning of 'nice car' and is, coincidentally, David's wife), Kati Kairies (Backing vocals), Jennifer Kermeen (Vocals), Emily Kurtz (Played Cello on 'Pepper Angel'), Bland Lawson (an on-again/off-again member who played Keyboards), Kim MacQueen (Backing vocals), Steve MacQueen (Rhythm guitar), David Morris (Bass, lead vocals), Mark Morse (Helped the band go "hoo" and "ho" on 'South Dakota'), Pat Puckett (Of the Tallahassee band 'Casual T's', who played session guitar on Nice Car.), Stan Rosenthal. (Played Trombone on 'Jeffersons.')

Dave Murphy, the bassist for the Tallahassee band 'Casual-Ts,' produced the album. The band lineup stayed pretty much the same until '94, when Kevin Alexander left, and was replaced by Danny Foster.

The post-album incarnation of the band was when two additional percussionists were added, Joe Williams and Tim Schardl. MacQueen says, "With the three backup singers, two guitars, keyboard, bass, drum and percussionists, we had too many people on stage and it was just cacophony when the percussionists played in a small club. Seems like this lasted less than a year, and peaked with a pretty dreadful experience in Pensacola, FL." (E-mail 1/23/03)

Then the on-again/off-again Bland Lawson was replaced by full-time Keyboardist Ben Wilcox at about the same time. Ben was a Tallahassee rock legend, the keyboardist and 'only sane member' of the proto-punk 'Slut Boys', and member emeritus of a dozen other bands. Kim MacQueen left the band around then, because she 'preferred being in the audience to being on stage,' and she was not replaced.

== The Breakup ==
In summer, 1995, the band broke up for a variety of reasons. David Morris (and his wife Ann) headed off to France for two years, but there was a one-shot-deal reunion on new years '97/'98, and that, as they say, is that.

== Re-Release ==
In the summer of 2007, David Morris, Pete Butler, and Steve MacQueen formed a new band called Bag We Bag , and decided to completely re-master the Cold Water Army album.
