= The Wild Girl (novel) =

1984 novel by Michèle Roberts

- Author: Michèle Roberts
- Language: English
- Publication date: 1984

The Wild Girl (later issued as The Secret Gospel of Mary Magdalene) is a 1984 novel by Michèle Roberts. This work tells a fictional story about the discovery of an apocryphal fifth Gospel in Provence, France. This gospel tells the tale of Jesus Christ and the period before his crucifixion, known as the Passion, from the perspective of Mary Magdalene. The story incorporates elements of a Gnostic tradition that speak of a sexual relationship between Jesus and Mary. For this reason, the book has been considered controversial and even blasphemous.

The central theme of the work is androgyny. Roberts attempts to incorporate the female perspective into a largely male-dominated tradition. The author wrote of her book that, "I imagined Mary Magdalene as Christ's lover because I wanted to imagine a Christianity that might have developed differently, and valued women equally with men." Some feminist critics of the work have panned the romantic interaction between Mary and Jesus, with Patricia Duncker calling it laughable.
