= Otisville, New York =

- Village
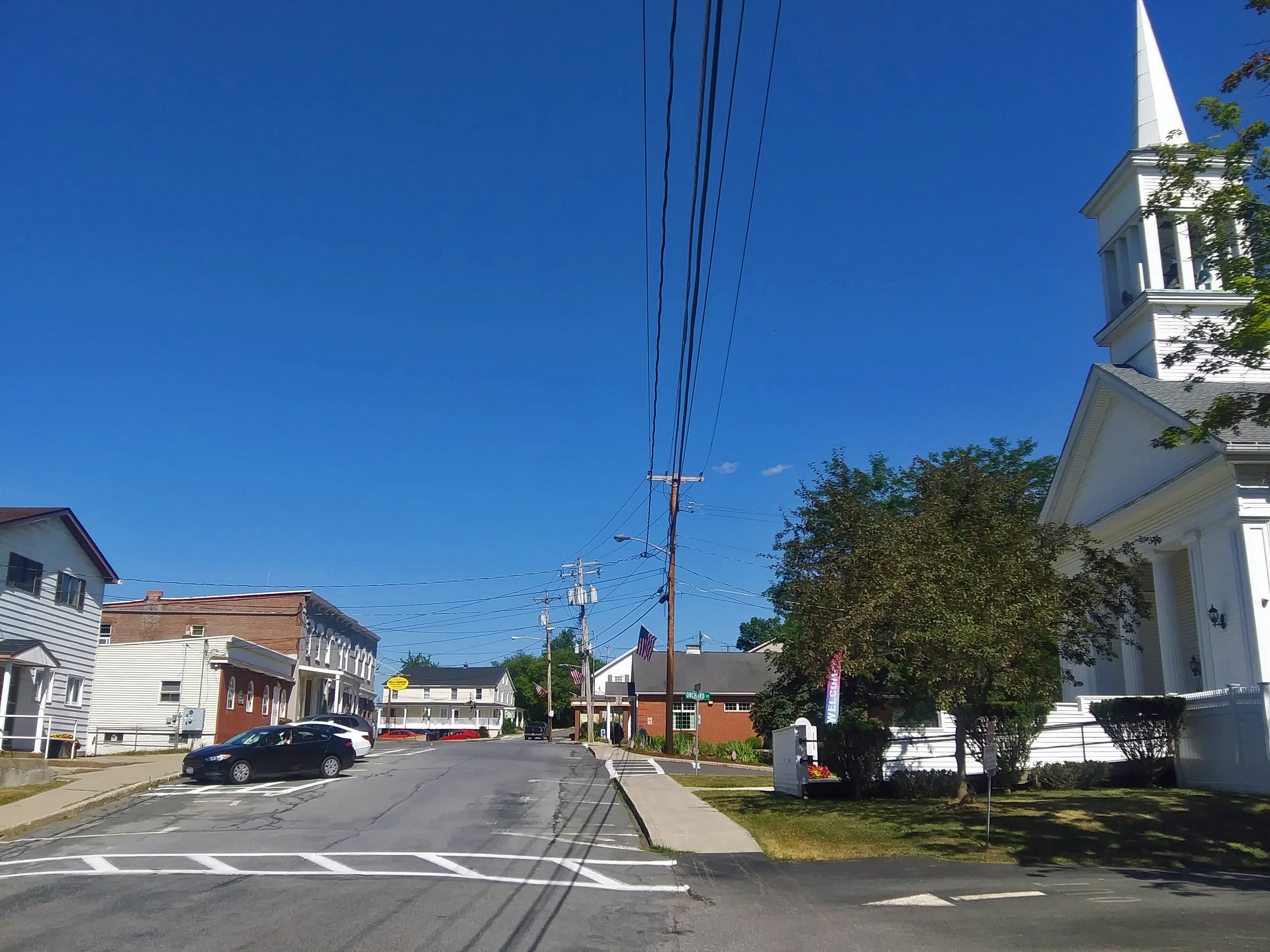
- Main Street, Otisville in 2022

- Location in Orange County and the state of New York.

- Location within the state of New York
- Coordinates: 41°28′N 74°32′W
- Country: United States
- State: New York
- County: Orange

Area
  - Total: 0.76 sq mi (1.98 km^{2})
  - Land: 0.76 sq mi (1.98 km^{2})
  - Water: 0 sq mi (0.00 km^{2})
- Elevation: 850 ft (260 m)

Population (2020)
  - Total: 969
  - Density: 1,268.0/sq mi (489.59/km^{2})
- Time zone: UTC-5 (Eastern (EST))
  - Summer (DST): UTC-4 (EDT)
- ZIP code: 10963
- Area code: 845
- FIPS code: 36-55673
- GNIS feature ID: 0959548

Otisville is a village in Orange County, New York, United States. The population was 969 at the 2020 census. It is part of the Kiryas Joel–Poughkeepsie–Newburgh, NY Metropolitan Statistical Area as well as the larger New York–Newark–Bridgeport, NY-NJ-CT-PA Combined Statistical Area.

The village of Otisville is in the town of Mount Hope, located near the western town line.

The mayor of Otisville is Brian Carey.

The name "Otisville" also refers to Federal Correctional Institution, Otisville and Otisville Correctional Facility, a state prison, both located nearby. There is also the station on Metro-North's Port Jervis Line.

== History ==
The community was settled in 1816. The community was named after Isaac Otis, an early settler and local merchant.

A former sanitarium located near the village is now a New York state prison. The sanitarium became a boys' training school for the state, and served as such until some time in the 1970s, when it was transformed into a N.Y. State prison facility. A boys' training school was another name for a reform school for male juvenile delinquents.

== Geography ==
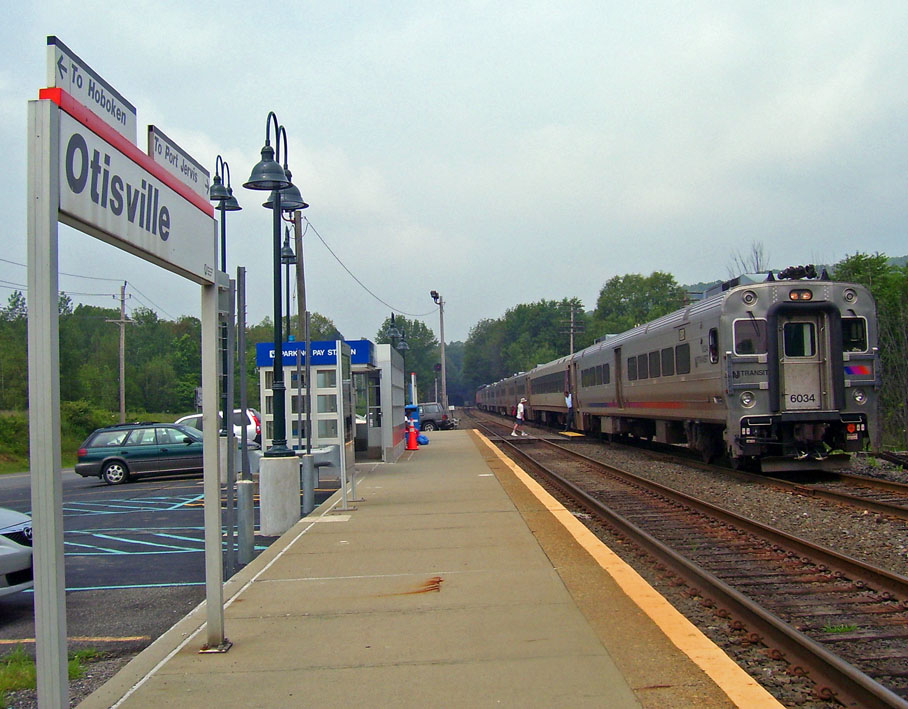
Otisville station is part of Metro-North Railroad's Port Jervis Line

Otisville is located at 41°28′15″N 74°32′22″W (41.470714, -74.539463).

According to the United States Census Bureau, the village has a total area of 0.7 square miles (1.8 km^{2}), all land.

Otisville is located at the intersection of New York State Route 211 and County Route 11.

== Demographics ==
Historical population
Census	Pop.	Note	%±
1880	471		—
1930	809		—
1940	889		9.9%
1950	911		2.5%
1960	896		−1.6%
1970	933		4.1%
1980	953		2.1%
1990	1,078		13.1%
2000	989		−8.3%
2010	1,068		8.0%
2020	969		−9.3%
U.S. Decennial Census

At the 2000 census there were 989 people, 356 households, and 250 families in the village. The population density was 1,425.9 inhabitants per square mile (550.5/km^{2}). There were 373 housing units at an average density of 537.8 per square mile (207.6/km^{2}). The racial makeup of the village was 89.48% White, 5.97% African American, 0.30% Native American, 0.61% Asian, 0.10% Pacific Islander, 0.51% from other races, and 3.03% from two or more races. Hispanic or Latino of any race were 6.67%.

Of the 356 households 37.6% had children under the age of 18 living with them, 51.1% were married couples living together, 15.4% had a female householder with no husband present, and 29.5% were non-families. 24.7% of households were one person and 12.6% were one person aged 65 or older. The average household size was 2.78 and the average family size was 3.33.

The age distribution was 28.2% under the age of 18, 8.8% from 18 to 24, 27.3% from 25 to 44, 24.9% from 45 to 64, and 10.8% 65 or older. The median age was 37 years. For every 100 females, there were 90.2 males. For every 100 females age 18 and over, there were 87.8 males.

The median household income was $49,500 and the median family income was $56,875. Males had a median income of $41,023 versus $31,023 for females. The per capita income for the village was $19,752. About 5.7% of families and 7.5% of the population were below the poverty line, including 9.4% of those under age 18 and 0.9% of those age 65 or over.

== Education ==
Minisink Valley Central School District, which covers the village, operates Otisville Elementary School.

== Notable person ==
- Dorothy Young, entertainer.

== Other locations ==
- Dragon Springs is in the area
