= Mount Hope, New York =

- Town
- Town of Mount Hope
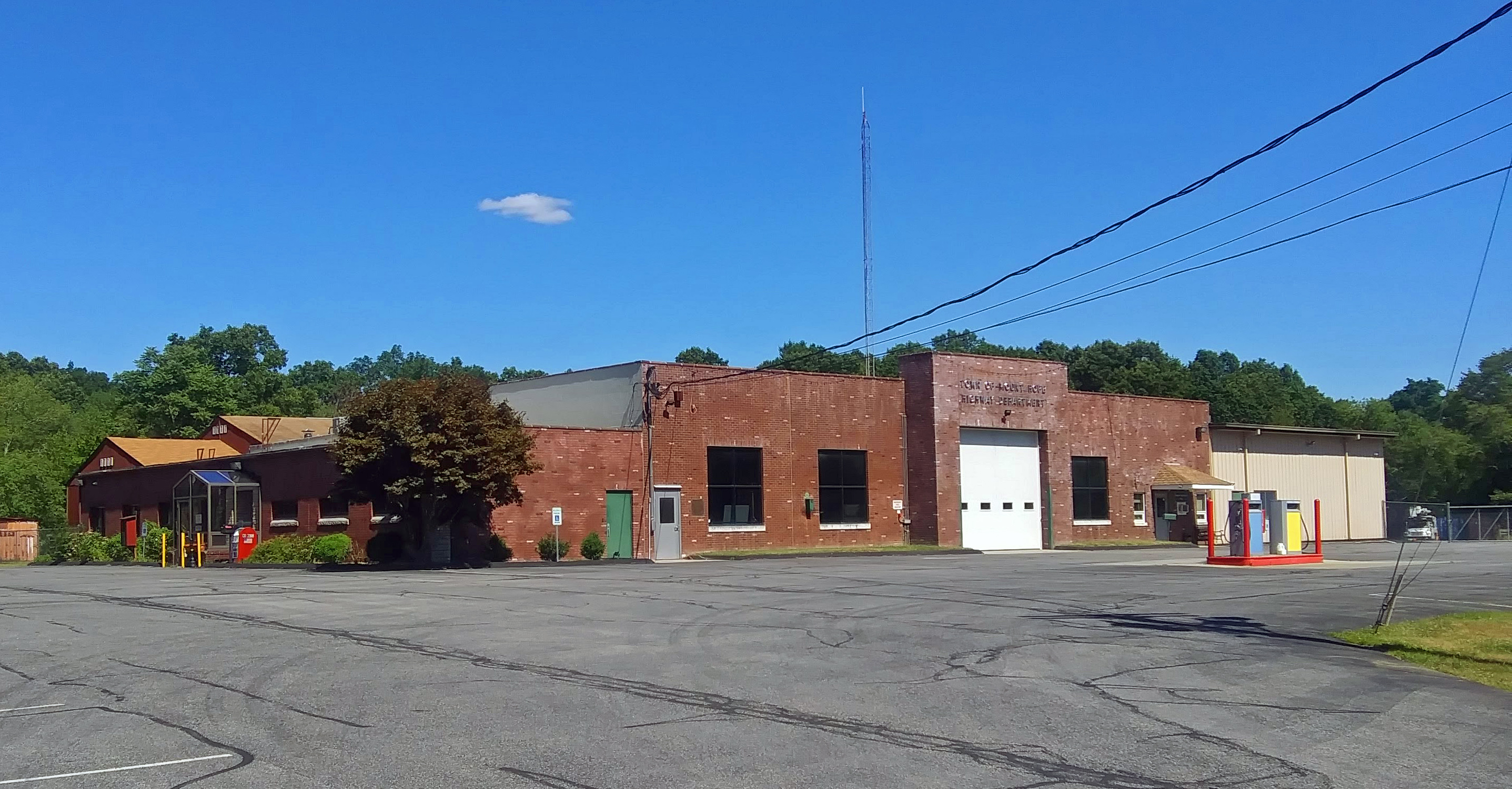
- Mount Hope Town Hall in July 2022.

- Location in Orange County and the state of New York.

- Location within the state of New York
- Coordinates: 41°27′58″N 74°31′37″W
- Country: United States
- State: New York
- County: Orange

Area
  - Total: 25.49 sq mi (66.03 km^{2})
  - Land: 25.14 sq mi (65.10 km^{2})
  - Water: 0.36 sq mi (0.94 km^{2}) 1.22%
- Elevation: 738 ft (225 m)

Population (2020)
  - Total: 6,537
  - Density: 260.1/sq mi (100.41/km^{2})
- Time zone: UTC-5 (Eastern (EST))
  - Summer (DST): UTC-4 (EDT)
- FIPS code: 36-48857
- GNIS feature ID: 0979241
- Website: mounthopeny.gov

Mount Hope is a town in the northwestern part of Orange County, New York, United States, west of Middletown. The northern town line is the border of Sullivan County. The population was 6,537 at the 2020 census.

== History ==
The first known settler of European descent arrived circa 1733.

The town of Mount Hope was created from the towns of Deerpark and Wallkill in 1825.

== Geography ==
According to the United States Census Bureau, the town has a total area of 25.5 square miles (66 km^{2}), of which 25.2 square miles (65 km^{2}) is land and 0.3 square miles (0.78 km^{2}) (1.22%) is water.

The Shawangunk Mountains lie on the western town line, and Shawangunk Creek flows through Mount Hope.

== Transportation ==
New York State Route 211 is an east–west highway in the town.

Metro-North Railroad's Port Jervis Line has a station at nearby Otisville.

== Demographics ==
Historical population
Census	Pop.	Note	%±
1830	1,535		—
1840	1,565		2.0%
1850	1,512		−3.4%
1860	1,575		4.2%
1870	1,842		17.0%
1880	1,549		−15.9%
1890	1,437		−7.2%
1900	1,236		−14.0%
1910	1,786		44.5%
1920	1,708		−4.4%
1930	1,847		8.1%
1940	1,817		−1.6%
1950	2,298		26.5%
1960	2,291		−0.3%
1970	2,966		29.5%
1980	4,398		48.3%
1990	5,971		35.8%
2000	6,639		11.2%
2010	7,018		5.7%
2020	6,537		−6.9%
U.S. Decennial Census

As of the census of 2000, there were 6,639 people, 1,582 households, and 1,218 families residing in the town. The population density was 263.5 inhabitants per square mile (101.7/km^{2}). There were 1,714 housing units at an average density of 68.0 per square mile (26.3/km^{2}). The racial makeup of the town was 78.63% white, 16.51% African American, 0.27% Native American, 1.48% Asian, 0.03% Pacific Islander, 1.84% from other races, and 1.25% from two or more races. Hispanic or Latino of any race were 14.61% of the population.

There were 1,582 households, out of which 40.5% had children under the age of 18 living with them, 63.3% were married couples living together, 9.3% had a female householder with no husband present, and 23.0% were non-families. 18.6% of all households were made up of individuals, and 8.0% had someone living alone who was 65 years of age or older. The average household size was 2.93 and the average family size was 3.34.

In the town, the population was spread out, with 20.6% under the age of 18, 7.3% from 18 to 24, 42.0% from 25 to 44, 23.1% from 45 to 64, and 7.0% who were 65 years of age or older. The median age was 36 years. For every 100 females, there were 186.2 males. For every 100 females age 18 and over, there were 216.1 males.

The median income for a household in the town was $56,948, and the median income for a family was $65,183. Males had a median income of $36,765 versus $30,208 for females. The per capita income for the town was $17,562. About 3.5% of families and 5.2% of the population were below the poverty line, including 7.0% of those under age 18 and 3.3% of those age 65 or over.

== Communities and locations in Mount Hope ==
- FCI Otisville – a federal prison near Otisville village.
- Finchville – a hamlet in the southwestern part of Mount Hope on County Road 35, named after the earliest known settler in the town.
- Guymard – a hamlet in the southwestern part of the town on the town line.
- Mount Hope – the hamlet of Mount Hope on County Road 11, south of Otisville.
- Otisville – a village located near the western town line on NY 211.
- Otisville Correctional Facility – a New York medium-security prison near Otisville village.
- Shawangunk Lake – a lake at the eastern town line.
