= WFMU =

Radio station in East Orange, New Jersey

- East Orange, New Jersey; United States
- Broadcast area: New York metropolitan area
- Frequency: 91.1 MHz
- Branding: 91.1 WFMU

Programming
- Format: Free-form radio

Ownership
- Owner: Auricle Communications

History
- First air date: April 1958
- Call sign meaning: FM Upsala College (former owner)

Technical information
- Licensing authority: FCC
- Facility ID: 3249
- Class: A
- ERP: 1,250 watts
- HAAT: 151 meters (495 ft)
- Transmitter coordinates: 40°47′19.3″N 74°15′18.5″W
- Translator: 91.9 W220EJ (Weehawken)
- Repeater: 90.1 WMFU (Mount Hope, New York)

Links
- Public license information: Public file; LMS
- Webcast: Listen live
- Website: wfmu.org

WFMU (91.1 MHz) is a non-commercial, listener-supported, independent community radio station licensed to East Orange, New Jersey, with studios in Jersey City. It is owned by Auricle Communications, broadcasting a free-form radio format. The station holds periodic on-air fundraisers and seeks donation on its website.

WFMU is a Class A station. It has an effective radiated power (ERP) of 1,250 watts. The station's transmitter is on Marcella Avenue in West Orange. Programming is also heard on 10-watt FM translator W220EJ at 91.9 FM in Weehawken. The lower Catskills, parts of Northern New Jersey and Eastern Pennsylvania can receive sister station WMFU's simulcast on 90.1 MHz, licensed to Mount Hope, New York, with its transmitter in Otisville. That station also has a 10-watt translator at 91.9 MHz in New City, New York, serving Rockland County.

== Philosophy and awards ==
WFMU does not belong to any public broadcasting network. Most programming is done in-house by volunteer DJs. Its website says that "experimentation, spontaneity and humor are among the station's most frequently noted distinguishing traits."

"WFMU is a place where the Singing Dogs are just as important as Elvis; a place where you will, in fact, hear Elvis, but in close proximity to ritual disinterment music from Sumatra, the soundtrack from Mothra, a theremin band called Lothar and the Hand People, and the intergalactic jazz improvisations of Sun Ra's Arkestra," wrote Jaime Wolf in a 1999 New York Times station profile.

WFMU was named "Best Radio Station in the Country" by Rolling Stone magazine for four consecutive years: 1991 to 1994. WFMU has also been dubbed the best radio station in either NYC or the US by The Village Voice, New York Press, and CMJ, among others. The station also won three awards ("Best Specialty Programming", "Most Eclectic Programming", and "Music Director Most Likely to Never Sell Out") at the 2006 CMJ College Radio Awards.

== History ==
=== Upsala College ===
WFMU signed on the air in April 1958. WFMU was owned by Upsala College in East Orange, New Jersey, a small, independent college in the suburbs of New York City. Initially it was a student-staffed and faculty-administered college radio operation. But as time went on, the station only had a loose association with the college. By the 1980s most of the station's staff were not students and the station's management, though hired by the college, had little involvement with the academic community.

In December 1983, Ken Freedman joined WFMU as a DJ and succeeded Bruce Longstreet as general manager in August 1985.

Ken Freedman talks about frequency disputes and WFMU (1990)

In 1989, WFMU successfully fended off a challenge to the station's license from four rival broadcasters, who claimed that WFMU was broadcasting above its legal power limit.

A 1990 telephone performance on WFMU by Daniel Johnston was the primary inspiration for filmmaker Jeff Feuerzeig to create the documentary film, The Devil and Daniel Johnston.

In late 1991, Jeff Buckley made his radio debut on WFMU and returned numerous times before signing with Columbia Records.

=== Auricle Communications ===
In 1992, the non-profit organization Auricle Communications was founded. Auricle purchased WFMU's license from Upsala College in 1994, one year prior to the college's bankruptcy in 1995.

In 1993, the station launched its website, and in 1997 it began streaming its broadcasts full-time.

In August 1998, listener donations funded a new studio and office in Jersey City.

In May 2001, WFMU received worldwide attention when both national and international media outlets covered DJ Glen Jones's successful attempt to break the Guinness World Record for longest consecutive radio broadcast. Jones stayed on the air a full 100 hours and 42 seconds.

In 2005, WFMU expanded its online broadcasting efforts by offering 15 hours a week of Internet-only live programming, as well as an independent 24-hour-a-day webcast of Nachum Segal's Jewish Moments in the Morning program.

=== Streaming ===
In January 2006, WFMU announced the availability of the station's live stream and archives to mobile devices running the operating systems Windows Mobile (Pocket PC) and Palm OS.

In November 2007, WFMU became the first radio station in the world to offer live streaming to the Apple iPhone.

From 2014 to 2015, a documentary on WFMU, Sex and Broadcasting: A Film About WFMU, screened at American film festivals and independent cinemas nationwide.

=== Monty Hall ===
In 2014, WFMU acquired the building at 43 Montgomery Street, that has housed their studios and offices since 1998. That same year the station built out and opened a performing arts venue called Monty Hall.

== The Audience Engine ==
Congera Corporation
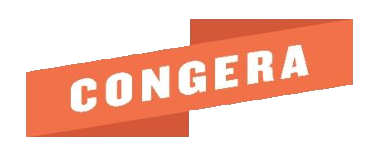
- Type: Public Benefit Corporation
- Industry: Internet, broadcasting
- Founded: 2015
- Headquarters: Jersey City, New Jersey, USA,
- Key people: Ken Freedman and Liz Berg, Founders
- Website: http://www.audienceengine.net

The Audience Engine is announced open-source, customizable suite of fundraising tools for public radio being developed by the Congera Corporation, a subsidiary of WFMU Radio. It was conceived by and is being developed under the supervision of WFMU management, but as of November 2020 no product has been announced, demoed or released thus rendering the project as effectively vaporware.

The platform is based on WFMU's own model of fundraising and listener-community relations, a project that began development in 1998 and WFMU claims helps raise 70% of its annual $2.5 million operating budget via its website. The developers explain that "by pairing online content, real-time playlist information, social media, and community interaction tools directly with crowdfunding campaigns, WFMU has not only built a positive and intelligent online community, but also a sustainable model that can be adopted by other organizations." Besides radio, Audience Engine has potential usage for online television and journalism. The goal is to "enable organizations ... to build audiences and become self sufficient."

A large part of Audience Engine's potential appeal is its tightly integrated fundraising capabilities. "Audience Engine comes with a set of tools that integrates crowdfunding-inspired donation tools throughout a publisher's site, with on and off-site widgets for donations as well as gift reward management, and a full suite of analytics underlying it all for that publisher to gain insight on what is and isn't raising money," noted Flanagan. Freedman observed that "Kickstarter did a great job of borrowing or stealing the concept of the pledge drive, and vastly improved it as well. Public media hasn't borrowed it back yet! That's what we're trying to do."

Although aimed primarily towards small and mid-sized radio stations, larger public radio stations such as WBUR and WNYC have considered harnessing the platform's possible uses in their operations.

A draft of the platform was publicly debuted at a launch event held on November 5, 2015.

=== Platform ===
The platform is supposedly being built in modular APIs that utilize JavaScript and XML feeds, but will include modules that integrate into Drupal, which is used by many small news organizations.

Part of the Audience Engine's philosophy is to retain the listener's or reader's attention on the station website, rather than redirect them to external social media. "Community based radio stations have to start thinking about online platforms that don’t effectively abandon discussion and networking to Twitter, Facebook, Reddit, or LinkedIn, and the rest of the usual suspects," said Matthew Lasar at Radio Survivor. "[O]nce your listeners and/or website readers are off to Twitter/Facebook-land, they’re all but gone. They’re not commenting on your podcast or stream or blog post in your house. They’re far far away, helping Mark Zuckerberg bring in that advertisement and audience data cash."

Radio World described the mocked up Audience Engine dashboard as featuring "a responsively designed social content page for radio and news sites, engineered for live, positive audience feedback and created with self-sustaining crowdfunding in mind. Both Web and mobile pages have a built-in, interactive second screen, with incentives for positive contributions, and tools for stopping disruptive behavior."

The project’s proposed first module, a crowdfunding app called Mynte, was scheduled to launch in 2018 but nothing has appeared as of November 2020.

Besides WFMU, potential early adopters of Audience Engine include WWOZ-FM, a New Orleans–based jazz and blues station; WSOU-FM (Seton Hall University), and WPRB-FM (Princeton University).

=== Development team ===
Early development of Audience Engine was undertaken by Bocoup, a developer of open-source web technologies which has collaborated with Google, Microsoft, Walmart, eBay, and Apple. Bocoup's involvement ended in January 2016, and the project was turned over to a team of independent developers under the supervision of WFMU.

WordPress developers Joey Dehnert and Andrew Nealon at InsertCulture, a now defunct development firm, have helped develop the foundation of Audience Engine’s web platform.

The Audience Engine project has received $500,000 in grant money over several years from the Geraldine R. Dodge Foundation to undertake development of the software.

As of March 2021, WFMU remains the sole user of Audience Engine, as development has gone "much slower than expected" and due to the fact that it remains incomplete, despite its original target release date of 2020.

=== Spinitron ===
In 2016, Audience Engine's parent company Congera merged with Boston-based Spinitron LLC, a music tracking software, for SoundExchange, airplay playlist, and other copyright-compliance reporting, company.

== See also ==
- List of community radio stations in the United States
- List of WFMU hosts
- WMFU – 90.1 FM, licensed to Mount Hope, New York
