= National Register of Historic Places listings in Susquehanna County, Pennsylvania =

Location of Susquehanna County in Pennsylvania

This is a list of the National Register of Historic Places listings in Susquehanna County, Pennsylvania.

This is intended to be a complete list of the properties on the National Register of Historic Places in Susquehanna County, Pennsylvania, United States. The locations of National Register properties for which the latitude and longitude coordinates are included below, may be seen in a map.

There are nine properties listed on the National Register in the county.

== Current listings ==
	Name on the Register	Image	Date listed	Location	Municipality	Description
1	Bridge in Gibson Borough	Bridge in Gibson Borough	June 22, 1988 (#88000839)	Legislative Route 57045 over Tunkhannock Creek; 41°44′32″N 75°37′51″W	Gibson Township	
2	Dennis Farm	Dennis Farm	September 30, 2014 (#14000816)	Creek Road, 0.4 miles (0.64 km) south of the Zicks Hill Road junction 41°43′54″N 75°45′23″W	Brooklyn Township	
3	Erie Railroad Station	Erie Railroad Station	June 19, 1972 (#72001177)	South bank of the Susquehanna River; 41°56′43″N 75°36′30″W	Susquehanna	
4	Montrose Historic District	Montrose Historic District	June 8, 2011 (#11000342)	Roughly bounded by Wyalusing, Owego, Spruce and Chenango Streets; Lake Avenue; High and Turrell Streets; Grow Avenue; and Jessup Street; 41°50′02″N 75°52′38″W	Montrose	
5	Sylvanus Mulford House	Sylvanus Mulford House	May 22, 1978 (#78002473)	65 Church Street; 41°49′55″N 75°52′34″W	Montrose	
6	Silver Lake Bank	Silver Lake Bank	March 7, 1975 (#75001666)	75 Church Street; 41°49′55″N 75°52′34″W	Montrose	
7	Silver Lake Schoolhouse #1	Silver Lake Schoolhouse #1	September 9, 2024 (#100010759)	1340 Wilkes Barre Turnpike; 41°54′14″N 75°54′58″W	Montrose	
8	Starrucca Viaduct	Starrucca Viaduct	October 29, 1975 (#75001665)	Pennsylvania Route 57058 over Starrucca Creek; 41°57′51″N 75°35′02″W	Lanesboro	
9	Susquehanna County Courthouse Complex	Susquehanna County Courthouse Complex	June 28, 1996 (#96000706)	Town Green, junction of Public Avenue and Maple Street; 41°50′04″N 75°52′35″W	Montrose	

== See also ==
- List of Pennsylvania state historical markers in Susquehanna County
