= Starrucca =

Starrucca may refer to:

In Pennsylvania:

- Starrucca, Pennsylvania, a borough in Wayne County
- Starrucca Creek, a tributary of the North Branch Susquehanna River
- Starrucca Viaduct, a stone arch bridge that spans Starrucca Creek near Lanesboro
