= Susquehanna Community School District =

School district in Pennsylvania

Susquehanna School District

Location
- 3192 Turnpike St. Susquehanna, PA 18847 Susquehanna, Pennsylvania USA

District information
- Type: Public
- Schools: 2

Other information
- Website: www.scschools.org

Susquehanna Community School District is a third-class school district in Susquehanna and Wayne Counties in Pennsylvania. The district's population was 5,195 at the time of the 2010 United States Census.

The district covers approximately 101 square miles (260 km^{2}). According to federal census data, its population has decreased by 299 residents from 5,494 residents in 2000. The district students are 97% white, 1% Asian, 1% black and 1% Hispanic.

The district operates one elementary school and one combined junior-senior high school.

== Regions and constituent municipalities ==
The district is divided into three regions, which include the following municipalities (labeled by county):

=== Region I ===
- Susquehanna Depot Borough (Susquehanna)

=== Region II ===
- Lanesboro Borough (Susquehanna)
- Oakland Borough (Susquehanna)
- Oakland Township (Susquehanna)

=== Region III ===
- Ararat Township (Susquehanna)
- Harmony Township (Susquehanna)
- Starucca Borough (Wayne)
- Thompson Borough (Susquehanna)
- Thompson Township (Susquehanna)
