= Lanesborough =

Lanesborough or Lanesboro may refer to:

- Earl of Lanesborough

== Places etc. in the United States ==
- Lanesboro, Iowa, a city
- Lanesborough, Massachusetts, a town
- Lanesboro, Minnesota, a city
- Lanesboro, Pennsylvania, a borough

== Places etc. elsewhere ==
- The Lanesborough, a hotel in central London, England
- Lanesborough–Ballyleague, County Longford, Ireland, a town
  - Lanesborough (Parliament of Ireland constituency), named after the town
