= List of Erie Railroad structures documented by the Historic American Engineering Record =

This is a list of Erie Railroad structures documented by the Historic American Engineering Record.

== Structures ==
Survey No.	Name (as assigned by HAER)	Built	Documented	Type	Location	County	State	Coordinates
NJ-21	Erie Railway, Clifton Station	1889		Station	Clifton	Passaic	New Jersey	40°53′24″N 74°08′57″W
NJ-22	Erie Railway, Bergen Hill Open Cut	1910	1978	Cut	Jersey City	Hudson	New Jersey	40°44′13″N 74°03′34″W
NJ-23	Erie Railway, Ferryboat Susquehanna	1864		Ferry	Jersey City	Hudson	New Jersey	
NJ-24	Erie Railway, Pier 5 Immigrant's Waiting Room			Pier	Jersey City	Hudson	New Jersey	
NJ-25-A	Erie Railway, New York Division, Bridge 8.04 (c.1875)	1871		Bridge	Newark and Kearny	Essex and Hudson	New Jersey	40°45′16″N 74°09′52″W
NJ-25-B	Erie Railway, New York Division, Bridge 8.04 (c.1900)	1922		Bridge	Newark and Kearny	Essex and Hudson	New Jersey	40°45′16″N 74°09′52″W
NJ-38	Erie Railway, Paterson Station			Station	Paterson	Passaic	New Jersey	40°54′53″N 74°10′02″W
NJ-42	Erie and Lackawanna Railroad Bridge	1920	1984	Bridge	Kearny and Jersey City	Hudson	New Jersey	40°44′35″N 74°04′37″W
NJ-59	Delaware, Lackawanna and Western Railroad and Ferry Terminal, Ferry Slips and Bridges	1907	1983	Ferry terminal	Hoboken	Hudson	New Jersey	40°44′06″N 74°01′40″W
NY-21	Erie Railway, Otisville Tunnel	1908	1971	Tunnel	Otisville	Orange	New York	41°28′33″N 74°32′44″W
NY-22	Erie Railway, Port Jervis Station			Station	Port Jervis	Orange	New York	
NY-23	Erie Railway, Port Jervis Roundhouse			Roundhouse	Port Jervis	Orange	New York	41.3762454°N 74.695061°W
NY-24	Erie Railway, Port Jervis Rock Cut			Cut	Port Jervis	Orange	New York	
NY-26	Erie Railway, Deposit Station			Station	Deposit	Broome	New York	
NY-27	Erie Railway, Oquaga Creek Bridge		1971	Bridge	Deposit	Broome	New York	42°03′4″N 75°26′33″W
NY-28	Erie Railway, Delaware Division, Bridge 175.53		1971	Bridge	Deposit	Broome	New York	42°03′31″N 75°25′16″W
NY-29	Erie Railway, Clear Creek Viaduct		1971	Bridge	Lawtons	Erie	New York	42°31′18″N 78°55′53″W
NY-30	Erie Railway, Binghamton Station			Station	Binghamton	Broome	New York	
NY-31	Erie Railway, Binghamton Freight Station			Station	Binghamton	Broome	New York	
NY-32	Erie Railway and Pennsylvania Railroad, Horseheads Interlocking Tower			Tower	Horseheads	Chemung	New York	
NY-33	Erie Railway, Hornell Station		1971	Shop	Hornell	Steuben	New York	
NY-34	Erie Railway, Hornell Erecting Shop		1971	Shop	Hornell	Steuben	New York	
NY-35	Erie Railway, Corning Side Hill Cut		1971	Cut	Corning	Steuben	New York	
NY-36	Erie Railway, Elmira Station		1971	Station	Elmira	Chemung	New York	
NY-37	Erie Railway, Salamanca Station			Station	Salamanca	Cattaraugus	New York	
NY-38	Erie Railway, Salamanca Turntable			Turntable	Salamanca	Cattaraugus	New York	
NY-42	Erie Railway, Allegany Division, Bridge 367.33 (demolished)		1971	Bridge	Fillmore	Allegany	New York	42°26′57″N 78°05′09″W
NY-43	Erie Railway, Allegany Division, Bridge 375.41 (demolished)		1971	Bridge	Belfast	Allegany	New York	42°21′34″N 78°07′16″W
NY-46	Erie Railway, Dayton Tunnel		1971	Tunnel	Dayton	Cattaraugus	New York	42°25′16″N 78°58′32″W
NY-47	Erie Railway, Hancock Station			Station	Hancock	Delaware	New York	
NY-48	Erie Railway, Hancock Freight Station			Station	Hancock	Delaware	New York	
NY-49	Erie Railway, Warsaw Passenger and Freight Station		1971	Station	Warsaw	Wyoming	New York	
NY-52	Erie Railway, Avon Station		1972	Station	Avon	Livingston	New York	
NY-53	Erie Railway, Avon Freight Station		1972	Station	Avon	Livingston	New York	
NY-54	Erie Railway, Buffalo Division, Bridge 361.66	1875	1971	Bridge	Portageville	Wyoming	New York	42°34′40″N 78°02′58″W
NY-55	Erie Railway, Goshen Station			Station	Goshen	Orange	New York	
NY-56	Erie Railway, Middletown Station	1896	1971	Station	Middletown	Orange	New York	41°26′50″N 74°25′12″W
NY-59	Erie Railway, Jamestown Station	1930	1972	Station	Jamestown	Chautauqua	New York	42°07′24″N 77°56′54″W
NY-62	Erie Railway, Moodna Creek Viaduct	1909	1971	Bridge	Salisbury Mills	Orange	New York	41°25′49″N 74°05′57″W
NY-65	Erie Railway, Callicoon Passenger and Freight Station		1971	Station	Callicoon	Sullivan	New York	
NY-71	Erie Railway, East Buffalo Station			Station	Buffalo	Erie	New York	
NY-72	Erie Railway, Kensington Avenue Station			Station	Buffalo	Erie	New York	
NY-73	Erie Railway, Main Street Station			Station	Buffalo	Erie	New York	
NY-74	Erie Railway, Walden Avenue Station			Station	Buffalo	Erie	New York	
NY-76	Erie Railway, Corning Station			Station	Corning	Steuben	New York	
NY-78	Erie Railway, Central Avenue Pier			Pier	Dunkirk	Chautauqua	New York	
NY-85	Erie Railway, Chambers Street Ferry Terminal			Ferry terminal	Manhattan	New York	New York	
NY-86	Erie Railway, Twenty-third Street Ferry Terminal			Ferry terminal	Manhattan	New York	New York	
NY-91	Erie Railway, Niagara Falls Station			Station	Niagara Falls	Niagara	New York	
NY-92	Erie Railway, La Salle Station			Station	Niagara Falls	Niagara	New York	
NY-94	Erie Railway, North Tonawanda Station			Station	North Tonawanda	Niagara	New York	
NY-95	Erie Railway, Sawyer Creek Bridge (replaced)		1971	Bridge	Martinsville	Niagara	New York	43°03′33″N 78°50′13″W
NY-96	Erie Railway, Nyack Station			Station	Nyack	Rockland	New York	
NY-97	Erie Railroad, Painted Post Passenger and Freight Station			Station	Painted Post	Steuben	New York	
NY-103	Erie Railway, Wellsville Station	1911		Station	Wellsville	Allegany	New York	42°07′24″N 77°56′54″W
NY-124	Erie Railway	1835	1977	Railroad	Deposit	Broome	New York	
NY-135	Erie Railway, Collins Station			Station	Collins	Erie	New York	
NY-136	Erie Railway, Harriman Station	1911		Station	Harriman	Orange	New York	41°18′33″N 74°08′43″W
NY-137	Erie Railway, Sparkill Station			Station	Sparkill	Rockland	New York	
NY-139	Erie Railway, Suspension Bridge Station			Station	Bellevue	Erie	New York	
OH-135	Erie Railroad Cleveland Powerhouse (demolished)	1907	2014	Power plant	Cleveland	Cuyahoga	Ohio	41°57′46″N 75°35′00″W
PA-6	Erie Railway, Delaware Division, Bridge 189.46	1848	1971	Bridge	Lanesboro	Susquehanna	Pennsylvania	41°57′46″N 75°35′00″W
PA-7	Erie Railway, Bradford Division, Bridge 27.66 (ruin)	1882	1971	Bridge	Mount Jewett	McKean	Pennsylvania	41°45′45″N 78°35′19″W
PA-8	Erie Railway, Susquehanna Station and Hotel	1865	1971	Station	Susquehanna	Susquehanna	Pennsylvania	41°56′41″N 75°36′35″W
PA-9	Erie Railway, Susquehanna Freight Station		1971	Station	Susquehanna	Susquehanna	Pennsylvania	41°56′43″N 75°36′31″W
PA-10	Erie Railway, Susquehanna Repair Shops		1971	Shop	Susquehanna	Susquehanna	Pennsylvania	41°56′47″N 75°36′17″W
PA-11	Atlantic and Great Western Railroad, Meadville Repair Shops		1971	Shop	Meadville	Crawford	Pennsylvania	41°38′36″N 80°09′30″W
PA-12	Erie Railway, Meadville Station	1893	1971	Station	Meadville	Crawford	Pennsylvania	41°38′21″N 80°09′27″W
PA-13	Erie Railway, Meadville Roundhouse		1971	Roundhouse	Meadville	Crawford	Pennsylvania	41°38′33″N 80°09′28″W
PA-16	Erie Railway, Delaware Division, Bridge 190.13	1930	1971	Bridge	Lanesboro	Susquehanna	Pennsylvania	41°57′16″N 75°35′09″W
PA-17	Erie Railway, Delaware Division, Culvert 190.21	1930	1971	Bridge	Lanesboro	Susquehanna	Pennsylvania	41°57′15″N 75°35′11″W
PA-18	Erie Railway, Cascade Bridge (replaced by embankment)		1971	Bridge	Lanesboro	Susquehanna	Pennsylvania	41°59′24″N 75°35′31″W
PA-20	Erie Railway, Buchanan Junction Interlocking Tower		1972	Tower	Meadville	Crawford	Pennsylvania	41°35′54″N 80°08′52″W
PA-21	Erie Railway, Mount Jewett Station			Station	Mount Jewett	McKean	Pennsylvania	
PA-23	Erie Railway, Delaware River Bridge		1971	Bridge	Millrift and Deerpark	Pike, and Orange	Pennsylvania and New York	41°24′23″N 74°44′29″W
PA-24	Erie Railway, Delaware Division, Bridge 110.54	1894	2000	Bridge	Lackawaxen	Pike	Pennsylvania	41°29′13″N 74°59′21″W
PA-25	Erie Railway, Hawley Coaling Station			Station	Hawley	Wayne	Pennsylvania	
PA-26	Erie Railway, Cambridge Springs Station	1891		Station	Cambridge Springs	Crawford	Pennsylvania	41°48′12″N 80°03′37″W
PA-27	Erie Railway, Diverging French Creek Bridges		1971	Bridge	Cambridge Springs	Crawford	Pennsylvania	41°49′55″N 79°58′41″W
PA-28	Erie Railway, Parallel French Creek Bridges		1971	Bridge	Cambridge Springs	Crawford	Pennsylvania	41°48′18″N 80°02′22″W
PA-29	Erie Railway, Cochranton Passenger and Freight Station		1972	Station	Cochranton	Crawford	Pennsylvania	41°31′06″N 80°03′10″W
PA-30	Erie Railway, Pond Eddy Side Hill Cut and Fill		1971	Cut	Shohola Township	Pike	Pennsylvania	41°25′48″N 74°49′39″W
PA-34	Pennsylvania Railroad, Erie Railway Bridge		1970	Bridge	Corry	Erie	Pennsylvania	41°53′59″N 79°43′13″W
PA-42	Erie Railway, Shohola Station		1971	Station	Shohola Township	Pike	Pennsylvania	41°28′28″N 74°54′53″W
PA-43	Erie Railway, Shohola Creek Bridge		1971	Bridge	Shohola Township	Pike	Pennsylvania	41°28′20″N 74°54′46″W
PA-44	Erie Railway, Shohola Side Hill Cut and Revetment		1971	Cut	Shohola Township	Pike	Pennsylvania	41°27′33″N 74°54′17″W
PA-45	Erie Railway, Union City Station			Station	Union City	Erie	Pennsylvania	41°53′42″N 79°50′44″W
PA-46	Erie Railway, Union City Freight Station			Station	Union City	Erie	Pennsylvania	41°53′43″N 79°50′52″W
PA-47	Erie Railway, Crossing Gate Tower			Tower	Union City	Erie	Pennsylvania	41°53′42″N 79°50′46″W
PA-63	Erie Railway, Meadville Division, Bridge 33.14	1891	1999	Bridge	Oil City	Venango	Pennsylvania	41°25′57″N 79°42′34″W
