= Shadigee Creek =

- Location of the mouth of Shadigee Creek Shadigee Creek (the United States)

Location
- Country: United States
- State: Pennsylvania

Physical characteristics
- Mouth: Starrucca Creek
  - location: Near Starrucca
  - coordinates: 41°53′31″N 75°26′23″W
- Length: 6.2 mi (10.0 km)

Basin features
- Progression: Shadigee Creek → Starrucca Creek → Susquehanna River → Chesapeake Bay → Atlantic Ocean

Shadigee Creek is a 6.2-mile-long (10.0 km) tributary of Starrucca Creek in Wayne County, Pennsylvania in the United States. It is part of the Susquehanna River watershed, flowing to Chesapeake Bay.

Shadigee Creek joins Starrucca Creek just downstream of the borough of Starrucca.

== See also ==
- List of rivers of Pennsylvania
