= List of Pennsylvania state historical markers in Susquehanna County =

Location of Susquehanna County in Pennsylvania

This is a list of the Pennsylvania state historical markers in Susquehanna County.

This is intended to be a complete list of the official state historical markers placed in Susquehanna County, Pennsylvania by the Pennsylvania Historical and Museum Commission (PHMC). The locations of the historical markers, as well as the latitude and longitude coordinates as provided by the PHMC's database, are included below when available. There are ten historical markers located in Susquehanna County.

== Historical markers ==
Marker title	Image	Date dedicated	Location	Marker type	Topics
Galusha Grow		May 15, 1947	Intersection US 11 & PA 547, N of Kingsley; 41.76232°N 75.75308°W	Roadside	Early Settlement, Government & Politics, Government & Politics 19th Century
Galusha Grow		May 15, 1947	PA 547 at cemetery, Harford; 41.78005°N 75.70128°W	Roadside	Early Settlement, Government & Politics, Government & Politics 19th Century
Galusha Grow		May 15, 1947	PA 92 just N of PA 374, Glenwood; 41.65134°N 75.72123°W	Roadside	Early Settlement, Government & Politics, Government & Politics 19th Century
Jonathan Jasper Wright (1840-1885)		September 13, 2001	PA 29 & Cemetery St. (T361), Springville; 41.69523°N 75.91872°W	Roadside	African American, Government & Politics 19th Century, Professions & Vocations, Underground Railroad
Joseph Smith		May 15, 1947	US 11 near I-81 interchange, between Great Bend & Hallstead; 41.96588°N 75.74065°W	Roadside	Religion, Writers
Joseph Smith		March 30, 1948	PA 171 at cemetery, near Skinner Rd., W of Oakland	Roadside	Religion, Writers
Mother Theresa Maxis Duchemin (1810-1892)		May 6, 2009	Turnpike St. (SR 1013) & Broad Ave., Susquehanna Depot	Roadside	African American, Religion, Women
Pennsylvania		January 1, 2008	Lackawanna Trail (US 11), N of Great Bend, near NY state line 42.1475°N 75.7994°W	Roadside	Government & Politics 17th Century, Government & Politics 18th Century, Religion, William Penn
Starrucca Viaduct		September 1, 1951	SR 1009 at Lanesboro near viaduct (Missing)	Roadside	Navigation, Railroads, Transportation
Susquehanna County		July 5, 1982	Monument Square at Maple St. & Lake Ave., adjacent to County Courthouse, Montrose; 41.8339°N 75.87682°W	City	African American, Government & Politics, Government & Politics 19th Century, Underground Railroad

== See also ==
- List of Pennsylvania state historical markers
- National Register of Historic Places listings in Susquehanna County, Pennsylvania
