= Stone Arch Bridge (Starrucca Creek) =

- Stone Arch Bridge, Starrucca Creek
- Formerly listed on the U.S. National Register of Historic Places
- Location: SR 57054, Starrucca, Pennsylvania
- Area: 0.2 acres (0.081 ha)
- Built: 1844
- Architectural style: Eliptical Stone Arch
- NRHP reference No.: 77001201

Significant dates
- Added to NRHP: January 1, 1979
- Removed from NRHP: May 8, 1986

Stone Arch Bridge, Starrucca Creek was a historic stone arch bridge located at Starrucca, Wayne County, Pennsylvania. It measured 18-foot-long (5.5 m) and crossed Starrucca Creek.

It was listed on the National Register of Historic Places in 1979. It was delisted in 1986, after being demolished.
