= Julius Walker Adams =

American civil engineer and railroad engineer

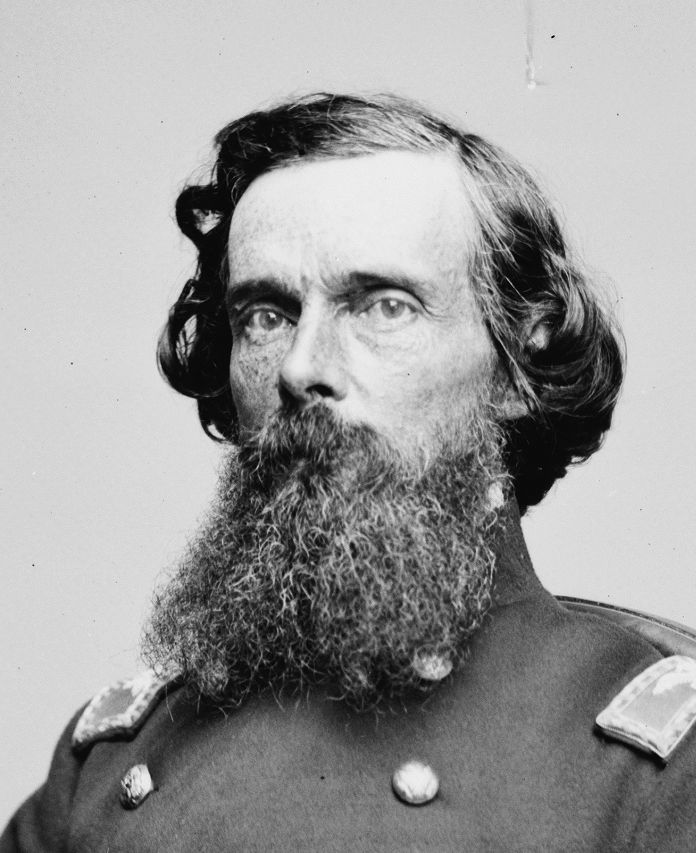
- Born: October 18, 1812; Boston, Massachusetts
- Died: December 13, 1899 (aged 87); Brooklyn, New York
- Resting place: Green-Wood Cemetery
- Education: United States Military Academy
- Occupation: Civil engineer
- Board member of: American Society of Civil Engineers, American Association for the Advancement of Science, New York Academy of Science
- Spouse: Elizabeth Denison
- Children: 8
- Military career
- Allegiance: Union
- Branch: United States Army
- Service years: 1861–1862
- Rank: Colonel
- Commands: 67th New York Infantry

Julius Walker Adams (October 18, 1812 – December 13, 1899) was an American civil engineer and railroad engineer, who designed the Starrucca Viaduct. He co-founded the American Society of Civil Engineers in 1852 and served as its president from 1874 to 1875.

== Early years ==
Born in Boston, Massachusetts, on October 18, 1812, son of Eli Adams and Sarah D. Swift. Adams was the second cousin of President John Quincy Adams. In 1830, he entered the United States Military Academy, where he studied for two years, but resigned to start working as an engineer for his uncle George Washington Whistler.

== Career ==
From 1832 to 1844, he acted as assistant engineer of various railroads. Adams was assistant engineer on the Providence and Stonington Railroad and on the Paterson and Hudson River Railroad and was chief engineer in various enterprises.

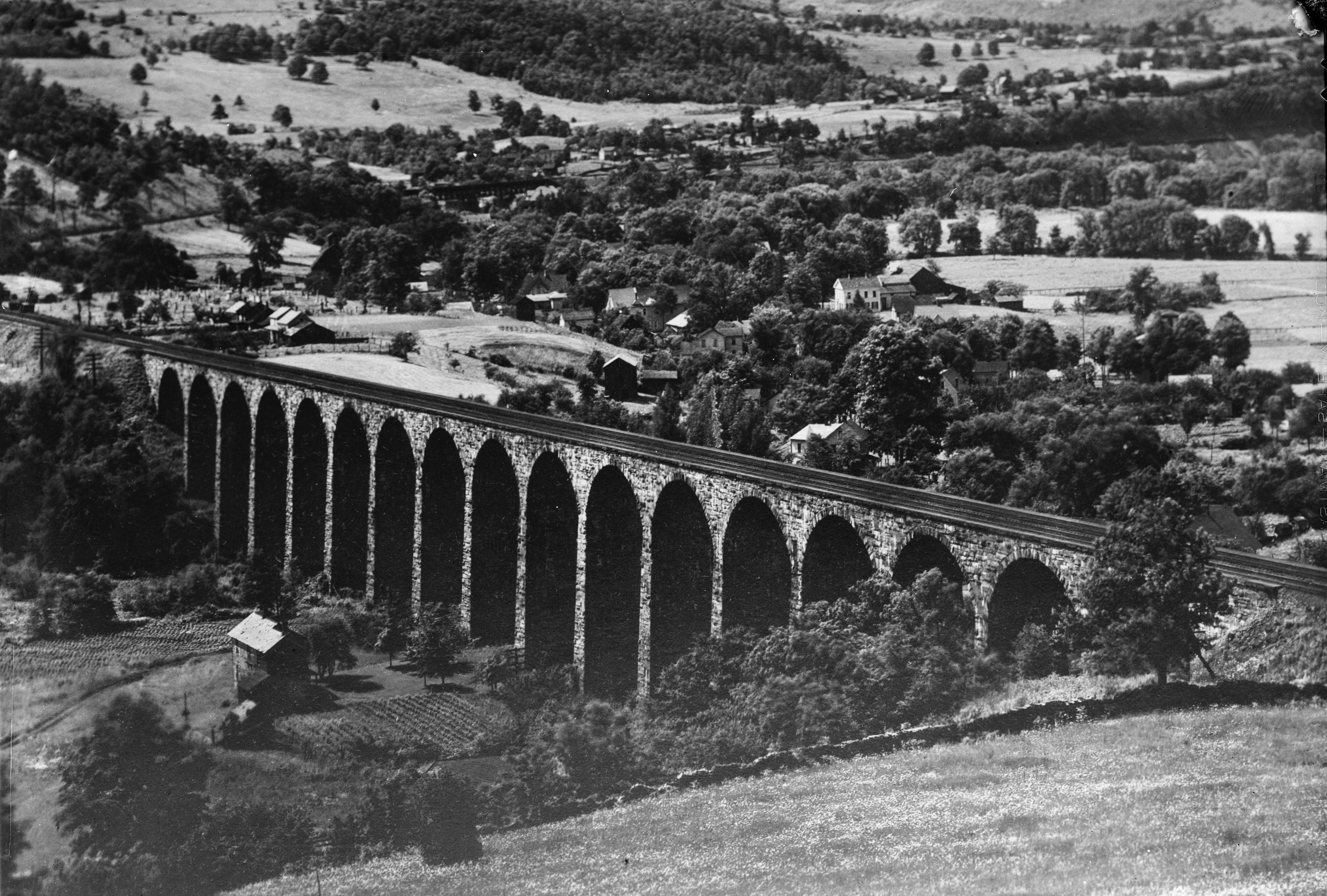
Starrucca Viaduct.

Then he was at Cochituate water works, Boston, in 1846, and in the same year became superintending engineer of the Erie Railway, where he worked with Daniel McCallum. With James P. Kirkwood Adams designed the stone arch Starrucca Viaduct, which was built in 1847-1848 by New York and Erie Railroad. In 1851 he also was editor of Appletons' Mechanics' Magazine. In 1852 he moved to Kentucky, was chief engineer of the Central Railroad, and in 1855 of the Memphis and Ohio Railroad.

In 1856, he switched from railroad engineering to design and supervise the first large-scale urban sewerage and drainage system in the United States for Brooklyn, New York, worked there from 1857 to 1860, when he became an engineer for New Haven's water works.

During the Civil War, he became a colonel of engineers and also of the 67th New York Volunteers, while served in Army of the Potomac, from 1861 to 1863. Wounded in the 1862 Battle of Seven Pines in Virginia, he resigned and returned to Brooklyn, where Adams was consulting engineer in New York city. During the 1863 New York City draft riots, he commanded the troops who defended the offices of the New York Times and New-York Tribune, which published the names of those selected for service.

== Last years ==
From 1869 to 1878 he served as chief engineer of the Brooklyn board of city works, and from 1878 to 1889 consulting engineer of the board of public works of New York City. A suggestion of his led to the formation of a company which eventually had charge of building the first bridge over the East River at New York.

He served as president of the American Society of Civil Engineers in 1874–75, and published Sewers and Drains and various scientific papers. He was edited Engineering News, from 1881 to 1882, and became member of the American Academy for the Advancement of Science and of the New York Academy of Science. He died in Brooklyn, New York, on December 13, 1899.

== Family ==
His son, Julius W. Adams (born in Westfield, Massachusetts, in April 1840; died in Brooklyn, New York, November 15, 1865), graduated at West Point in 1861, served there as assistant instructor of infantry tactics until June 1862, was wounded and taken prisoner at Gaines's Mills, promoted captain in August 1862, and served at Fredericksburg, Chancellorsville, Gettysburg, where he commanded a regiment, and the Second Battle of Cold Harbor, where he received wounds that caused his death.

== Selected publications ==
- Adams, Julius W.; et al. (1875, ed.) Templeton's Engineer, Millwright, and Mechanics' Companion: Report on the Pollution of Rivers, New York Academy of Sciences
- Adams, Julius Walker (1881). Sewerage of Elmira
- Adams, Julius Walker; Hering, Rudolph (1884). Report on the Improved Sewerage System
