= 67th New York Infantry Regiment =

American infantry regiment

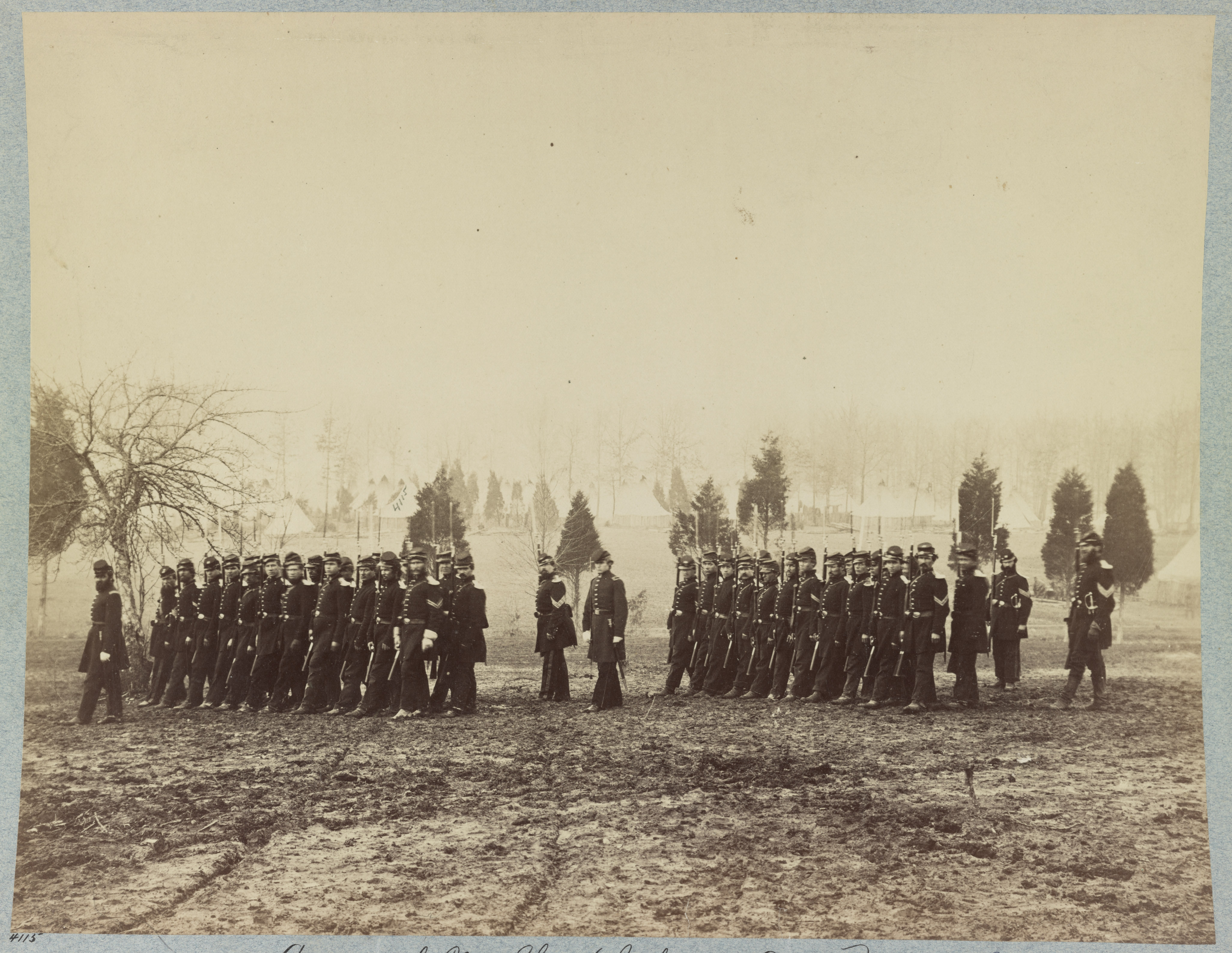
- Active: June 24, 1861 – September 1, 1864
- Country: United States of America
- Allegiance: Union
- Branch: Union Army
- Type: Infantry
- Size: 844 (Note: As reported back to Adjutant General Hillhouse upon departure from New York on November 16, 1861)
- Nickname: Governor’s Guard
- Equipment: Fusil d'Infanterie Mle 1842 (18mm/.69 caliber, rifled) (.54 caliber, rifled)
- Engagements: American Civil War: Siege of Yorktown; Battle of Williamsburg; Battle of Seven Pines; Seven Days Before Richmond; Malvern Hill; "Mud March"; Chancellorsville Campaign; Battle of Maryes Heights; Banks' Ford; Battle of Gettysburg; Bristoe Campaign; Rappahannock Station; Mine Run; Campaign from the Rapidan River to the James River; Battle of the Wilderness; Battle of Spotsylvania Court House; Battle of North Anna; Battle of Totopotomoy Creek; Battle of Cold Harbor; Siege of Petersburg; Repulse of Gen. Early's attack on Fort Stevens; Sheridan's Shenandoah Valley Campaign

Commanders
- Colonel: Julius Walker Adams
- Lieutenant Colonel: Nelson Cross

Insignia
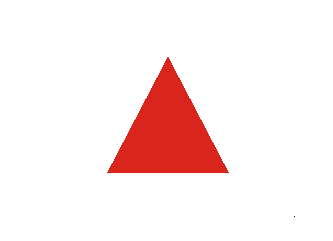
- 1st Division, IV Corps

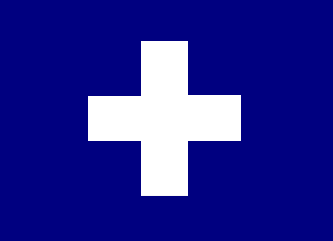
- 3rd Division, VI Corps

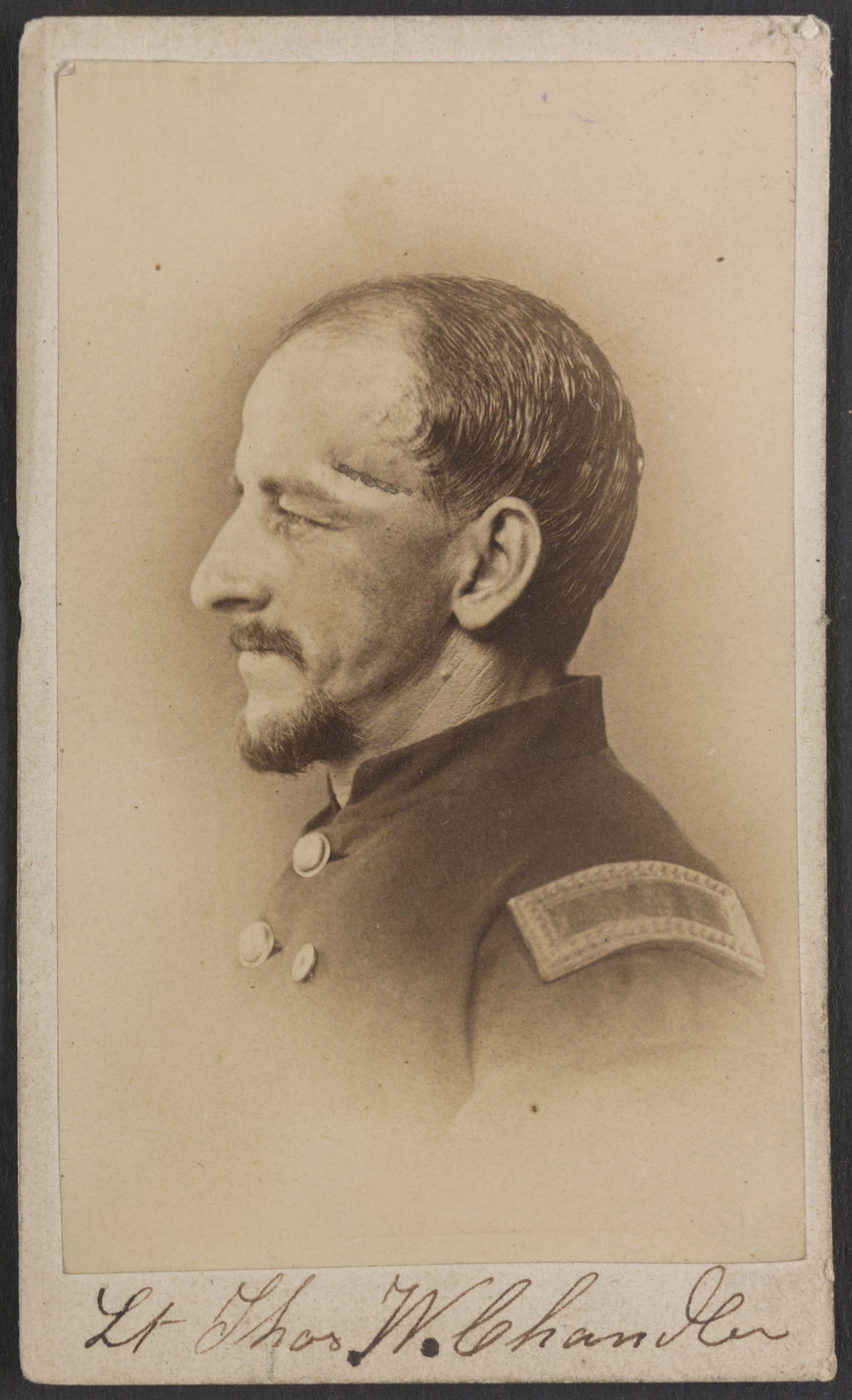
Lieutenant Thomas W. Chandler of Co. F, 67th New York Infantry Regiment. From the Liljenquist Family Collection of Civil War Photographs, Prints and Photographs Division, Library of Congress

The 67th New York Infantry Regiment was a regiment of the Union Army, which was raised in the city of Brooklyn in 1861 at the beginning of the American Civil War.

== Regimental history ==
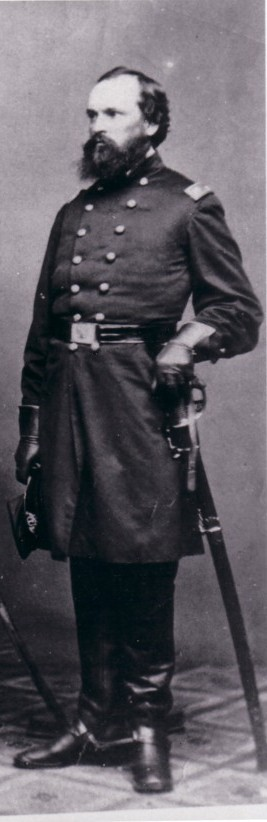
Lt. Colonel Nelson Cross

May and June 1861: The 67th Regiment, New York Volunteers (their official State Designation) was organized in Brooklyn, New York, under special authority of the War Department. The 67th received its State numerical designation August 19, 1861. The official recruiting office was on Fulton Street in Lower Manhattan.

Companies A, B, and E were known as "Beecher's Pets", after Henry Ward Beecher, a prominent Congregationalist clergyman, social reformer, dedicated abolitionist, and fiery speaker in the mid-19th century. He was the brother of Harriet Beecher Stowe, the author of Uncle Tom's Cabin. Plymouth Church of the Pilgrim, the church of the Reverend Beecher, was a stop on the Underground Railroad, helping escaped slaves reach Canada and freedom. It still stands on Hicks Street in Brooklyn and remains an active and highly patronized church.

Company C was principally recruited at Scio in Allegany County in western New York state. Company D was recruited from Clyde in Wayne County, and Company H was recruited from Rochester. The newspapers of the day referred to the 67th as the "Brooklyn Phalanx". Brooklyn was not yet part of New York City, and the men of the 67th called themselves the 1st Long Island Volunteers.

In total 1,567 men and boys enlisted in the 67th from May 1861 to June 1864. They were commanded by Colonel Julius Adams and Lt. Colonel Nelson Cross. Their first assignment was the defense of Washington, D.C.

August 19, 1861: The recruits of the 67th camped at South Brother Island, East River (between Rikers Island and The Bronx), moved briefly to Fort Hamilton before departing southward, then transferred to Fort Schuyler for basic army training.

August 21, 1861: The 67th was attached to Graham's Brigade, Buell's division (later known as "Keyes Division"), which was part of the Division of the Potomac. The division became part of the renamed Army of the Potomac.

August 22, 1861: The 67th departed for Washington, D.C., stopping overnight in Baltimore where they slept with loaded muskets at the station, due to danger from the Baltimore riot of 1861. They arrived in Washington on August 24. They would remain in Washington, moving from camp to camp, until March 1862.

October 1861: The 67th Regiment was attached to the 1st Brigade, 3rd Division, VI Army Corps, Army of the Potomac.

March 1862: The 67th was attached to the 2nd Brigade, 1st Division, IV Army Corps, Army of the Potomac. They were active at the Siege of Yorktown and the Battle of Williamsburg in Virginia. They moved with Gen. George McClellan in Virginia and were active in the Peninsular Campaign, becoming involved in the Battle of Seven Pines, Fair Oaks, and finally, Malvern Hill.

April 13, 1862: All musicians not assigned to specific companies were mustered out.

July and August 1862: The 67th Regiment was attached to the 2nd Brigade, 3rd Division, IV Army Corps, Army of the Potomac. They were part of the reserve units at the Battle of Antietam, September 16–17.

October 1862: Attached to 1st Brigade, 3rd Division, VI Army Corps, Army of the Potomac.

December 12–15, 1862: Involved in the Battle of Fredericksburg.

January 1863: Part of General Burnside's infamous Mud March. They were then active in the Chancellorsville Campaign and in operations at the Battle of Franklin's Crossing.

May 3, 1863: They were involved in the Battle of Marye's Heights, followed by action at Salem Heights and Bank's Ford.

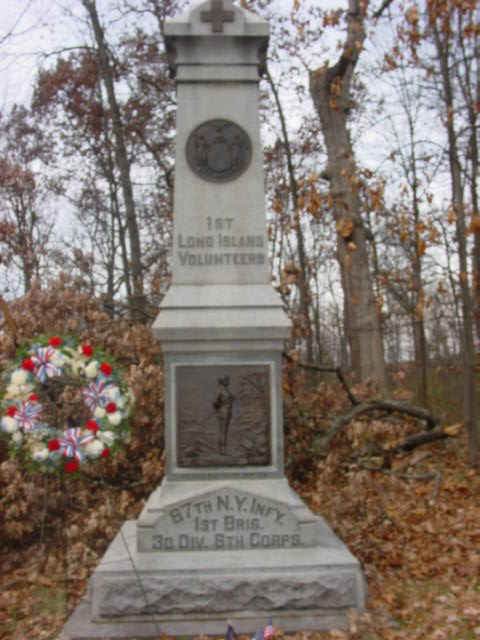
Monument to the 1st Long Island Volunteers at Culp's Hill, Gettysburg Battlefield

July 1863: At the Battle of Gettysburg, the regiment was down to 363 "effectives". A monument was later erected to the 67th Regiment on Culp's Hill with an inscription that reads "Held this position on July 3rd, then moved double quick to left center to resist Confederate charge upon our batteries". The Pickett-Pettigrew assault (more popularly, Pickett's Charge) was repulsed with severe casualties.

The 67th Regiment was then involved in the pursuit of General Robert E. Lee's Army of Northern Virginia, duty line on the Rappahannock, the Bristoe Campaign, and the Mine Run Campaign.

January to March 1864: The 67th had duty guarding prisoners at the prison at Johnson's Island, Lake Erie, Ohio.

April 1864: Attached to the 4th Brigade, 1st Division, VI Army Corps.

May and June 1864: Active in the campaign from the Rapidan River to the James River. The regiment now numbers approximately 320 at the beginning of this campaign.

May 1864: Second Battle of the Wilderness.

May 12, 1864: Involved in the assault and the vicious hand-to-hand fighting at the Mule Shoe Salient which became known as the Bloody Angle.

May 23–26: Involved in actions at the North Anna River.

May 28–31, 1864: Fought at the Battle of Cold Harbor.

June 17–18: On the line before Petersburg.

June 19 – July 9: The Siege of Petersburg.

July 4, 1864: The non-veterans (those volunteers who did not re-enlist) mustered out.

July 9–11, 1864: The 67th moved from Petersburg to Washington by ship, to help repulse General Jubal Early's attack on Fort Stevens, and his planned raid on Washington. They arrived just in the nick of time. The remaining men of the 67th were formed into a battalion of five companies A-E under Captain Henry C. Frisk.

September 1, 1864: The battalion was consolidated with the 65th New York Volunteer Infantry as part of Companies A, B, C and E.

August 7–September 1, 1864: As part of the 65th, they moved into the Shenandoah Valley and took part in General Philip Sheridan's Valley Campaigns of 1864. They were engaged in actions at the Third Battle of Winchester, the Battle of Fisher's Hill, and most notably the Battle of Cedar Creek. They helped close the Shenandoah Valley to the Confederacy. They returned to Petersburg as part of the VI Corps in December 1864, and took part in the Battle of Hatcher's Run in February 1865 and again during the final breakthrough of General Robert E. Lee's lines on April 2, 1865. They were active in the pursuit of General Lee towards Appomattox, engaging his army at the Battle of Sailor's Creek on April 6, and witnessed the final surrender of General Lee at Appomattox Court House on April 9, 1865.

During its service in the war the 67th lost 5 officers, 68 enlisted men by death or who were killed in action: by wounds received in action 2 officers, 37 enlisted men: of disease and other causes 2 officers and 37 enlisted men. Of the enlisted men who died, 9 died in the hands of the enemy. One man is listed as dying of sunstroke. One man was discharged for old age at the age of 45.

They were engaged in all of the 23 battles of the Army of the Potomac during 3 years of service.

30 of the men from the 1st Long Island Volunteers who are buried at Green-wood cemetery in Brooklyn have had their previously unmarked graves marked and headstones erected. The Green-wood cemetery has an ongoing project to identify all those unmarked graves from the Revolutionary War and the Civil War. There are still many graves to be examined. So far 3,300 Civil War graves have been examined, and the forgotten dead identified and honored.

== List of battles and engagements ==
=== 1862 ===
- Duty in the Defense of Washington
- Siege of Yorktown
- Battle of Williamsburg
- Battle of Seven Pines
- Seven Days Before Richmond
- Malvern Hill

=== 1863 ===
- "Mud March"
- Chancellorsville Campaign
- Battle of Maryes Heights
- Banks' Ford
- Battle of Gettysburg
- Bristoe Campaign
- Rappahannock Station
- Mine Run

=== 1864 ===
- Campaign from the Rapidan River to the James River
- Battle of the Wilderness
- Battle of Spotsylvania
- Spotsylvania Court House
- Assault on the Salient, a/k/a the "Bloody Angle"
- Battle of North Anna River
- Battle of Totopotomoy Creek
- Battle of Cold Harbor
- First Battle of Petersburg
- Siege of Petersburg
- Repulse of Gen. Early's attack on Fort Stevens
- Sheridan's Shenandoah Valley Campaign

== See also ==
- List of New York Civil War regiments
- The Fighting 69th (film about the regiment in WWI)
