= Silver Lake Schoolhouse =

Historic building in Silver Lake, Pennsylvania

- Silver Lake Schoolhouse #1
- U.S. National Register of Historic Places
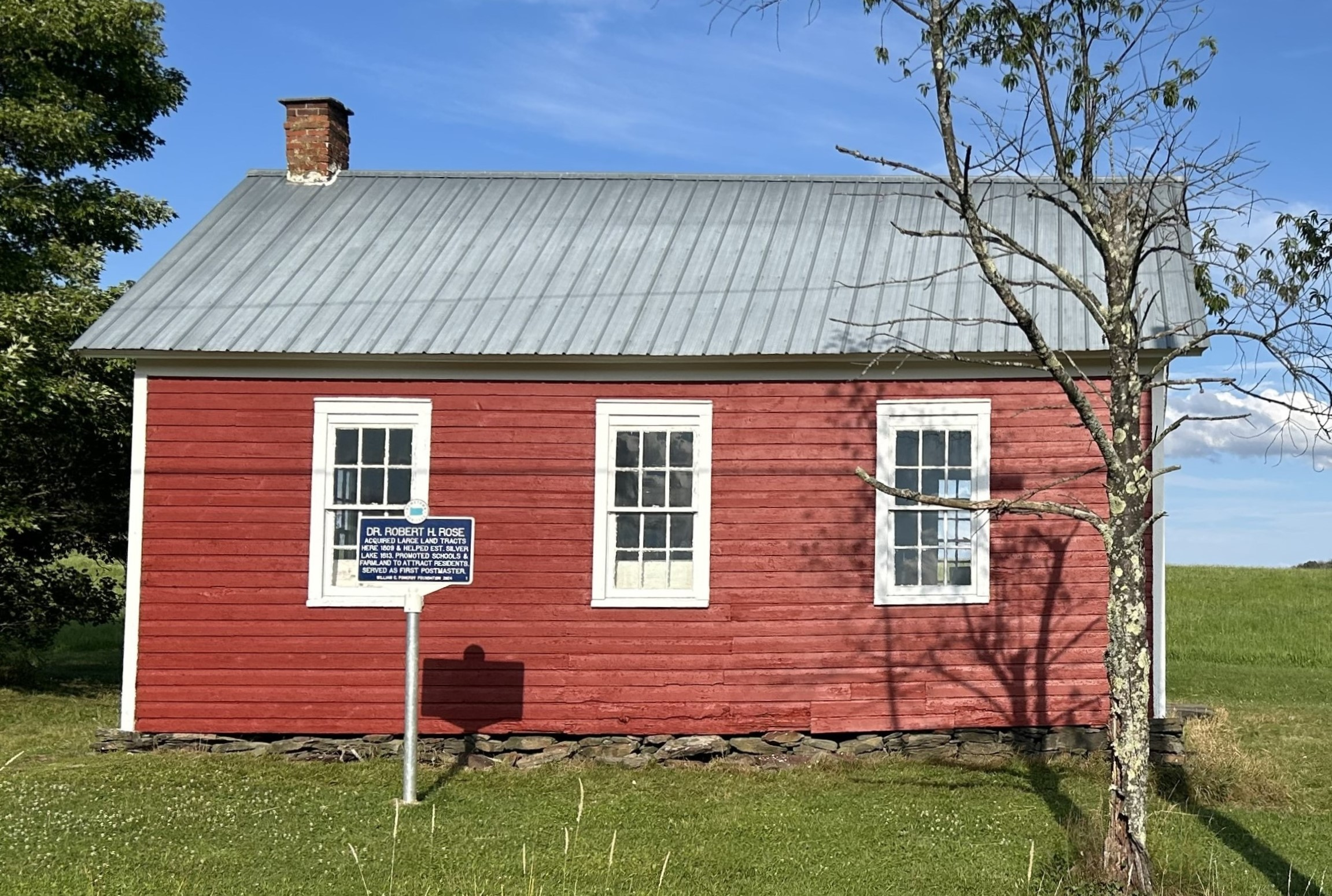

- Location within Pennsylvania Location within the United States
- Location: 1340 Wilkes Barre Turnpike Montrose Pennsylvania
- Coordinates: 41°54′14″N 75°54′58″W
- Area: 0.369 acres (0.149 ha)
- Built: c. 1862
- NRHP reference No.: 100010759
- Added to NRHP: September 9, 2024

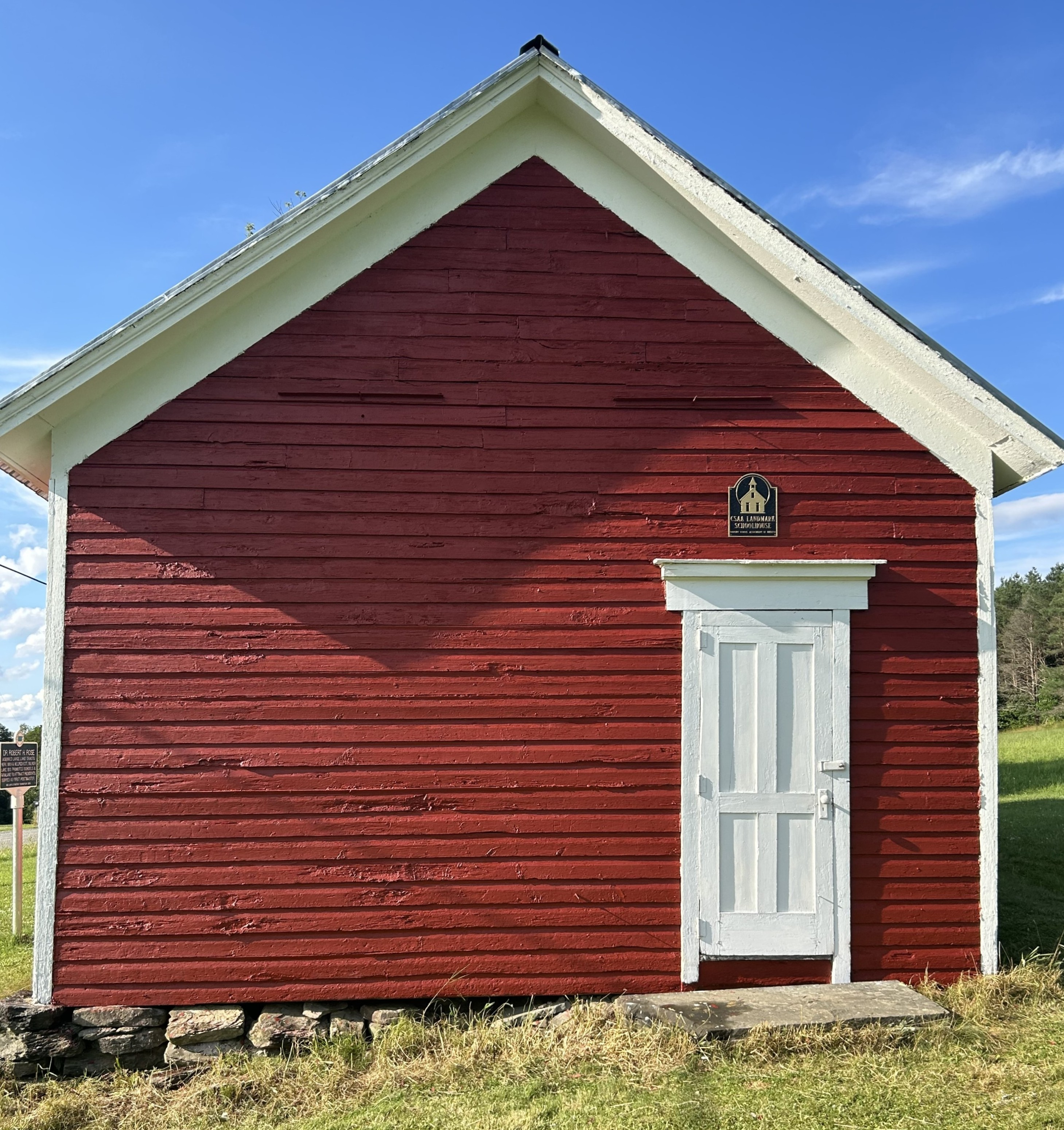
School entrance with CSAA maker

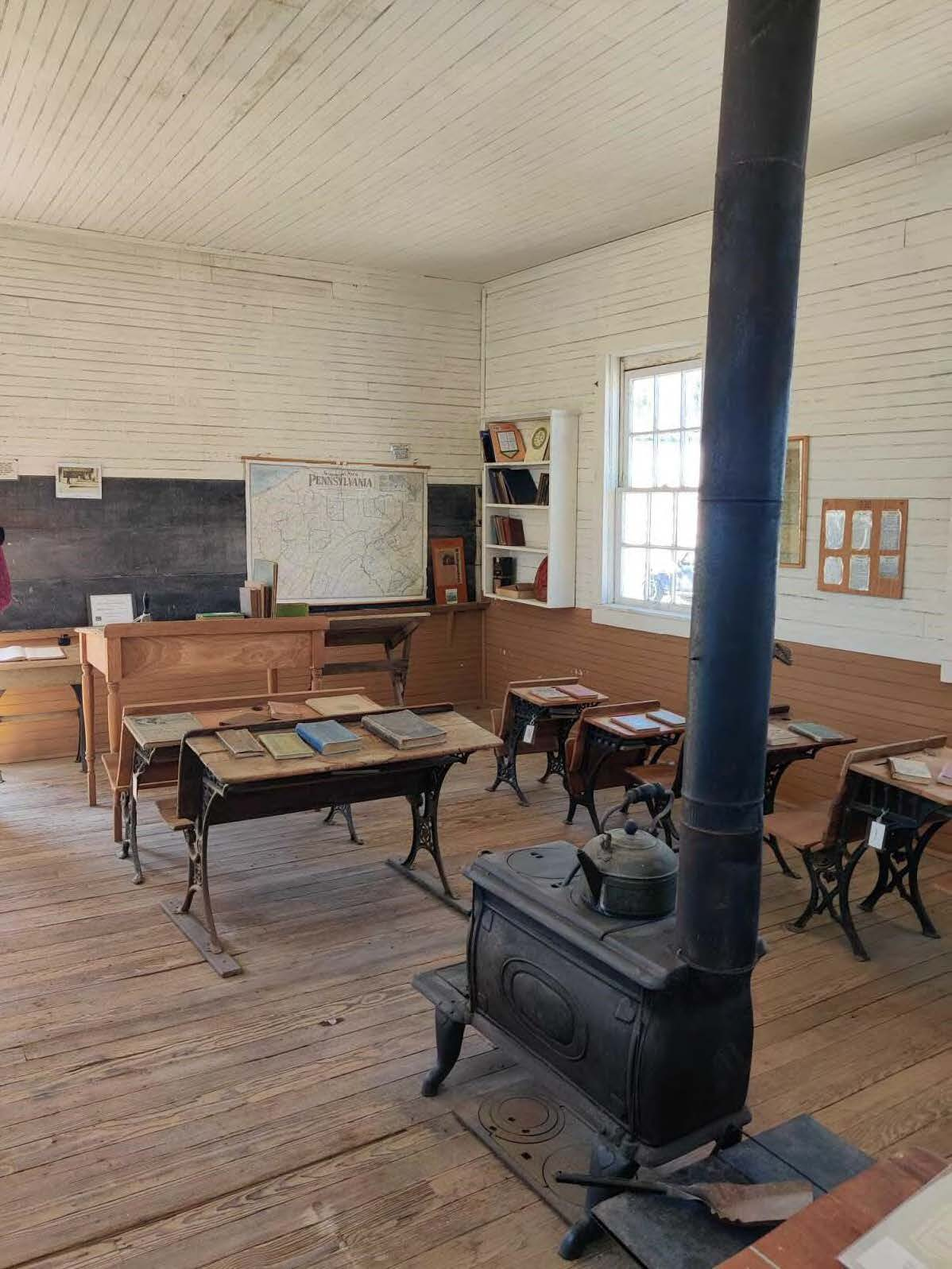
View from back of room

The Silver Lake Schoolhouse #1, also known as Meagher District School, Dacey School, and Richmond Hill School. The schoolhouse is an historic one room public schoolhouse that is located in Silver Lake, Susquehanna County, Pennsylvania. The current building is a wooden structure and based on best available information dates from around 1862, which was when the first deed was recorded for the property. A school on this site is first mentioned by the school's first teacher Thomas English with regard to a meeting to be held in 1840 about winter school. The school ceased operations in 1942.

== History ==
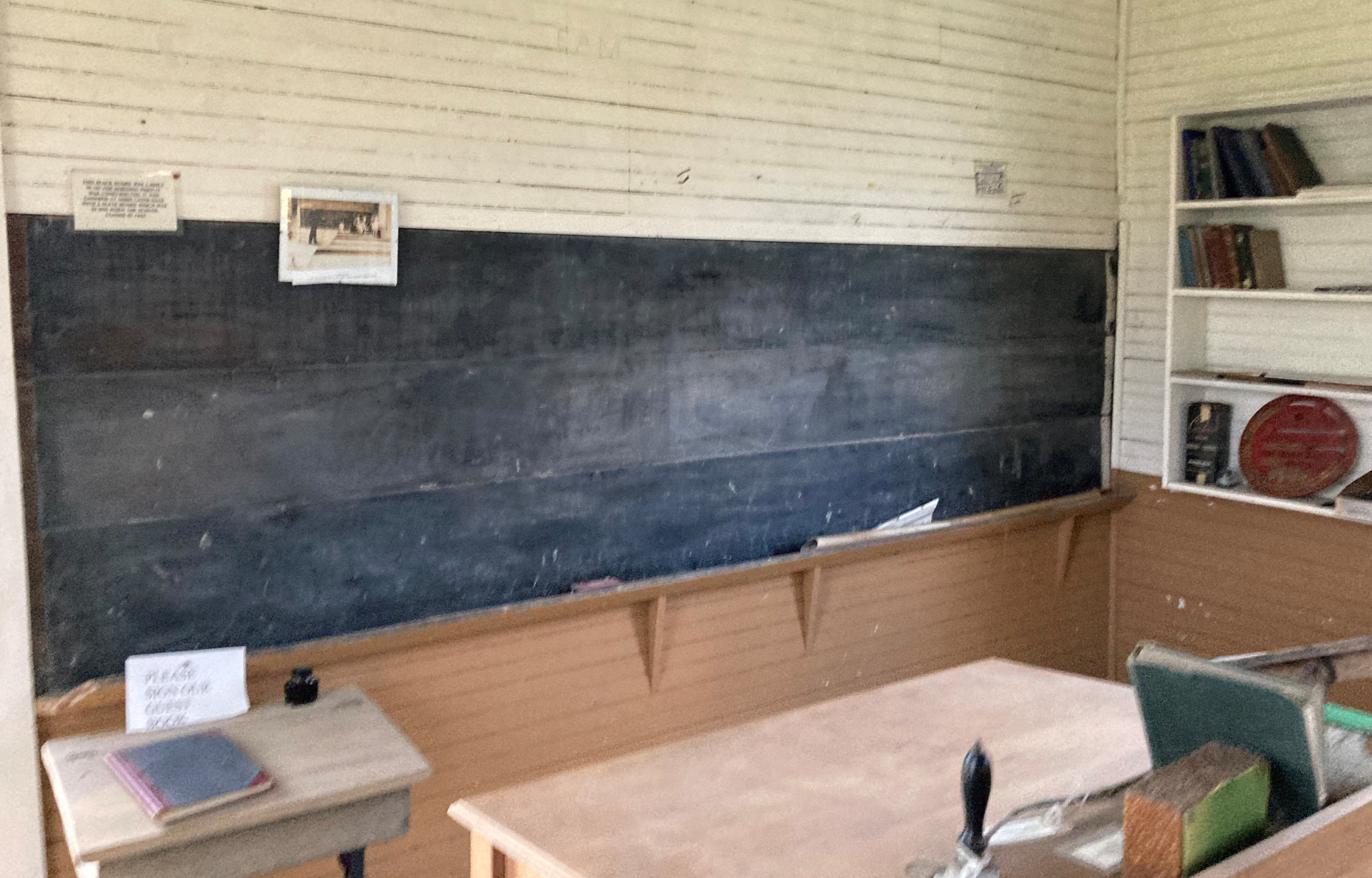
Blackboards

The wooden building is of a simple design that generally follows the state-provided templates of the time. The site and setting are virtually unchanged from the time the school building was constructed. One feature that helps to date the building are the blackboards that are made of soft wood painted black. The 1864-65 County Superintendent’s report notes that schools are just starting to get slate blackboards.

The schoolhouse is built on land once belonging to Dr. Robert H. Rose, who owned all of the land when Silver Lake Township was first formed. Dr. Rose promoted the schools of Silver Like in 1841 Ireland newspapers in order to attract immigrants to the area. A Pomeroy Foundation marker honoring Dr. Rose is located in front of the school. The schoolhouse is also listed on the Country School Association of America (CSAA). National Schoolhouse Registry.

== Architectural features and renovation ==
The current wooden building measures 18.5’ x 28.5’ with a foundation is dry-laid fieldstone. Between the years 1998-2000 the school was restored to closely conform to how it existed when constructed. The building has never had electricity or running water, and there are foundation remains for two outhouses in back of the building. Most of the building is original with the exception of the roof and windows. The current galvanized roof is similar to what existed at time of closure in 1942 and covers a layer of asphalt shingles with the original wooden shake singles underneath. There are six side windows that had shutters at one time and two back windows that were added after original construction. The windowsills are all original with replacement 1870 era windows and glass that match the original and were locally sourced. Six windows had windscreens to prevent papers blowing off desks. The top layer of white painted Clapboard siding was removed to expose the original red painted Dutch Lap siding underneath. An attached woodshed constructed in1900s was removed from front of building.

== Placement on the National Register of Historic Places ==
The site was added to the National Register of Historic Places on September 9, 2024. The Pennsylvania State Historic Preservation Office submitted the schoolhouse to National Register as part of the Multiple Property Submission (MPS) Educational Resources of Pennsylvania. MPS adds the schoolhouse to list of other previously approved Historic Register Education Properties in Pennsylvania. The schoolhouse was approved under criteria related to its significance in early Pennsylvania Public Education, and how it was used as an incentive in recruiting Irish Immigrants to the State and their subsequent success.

== See also ==
- List of U.S. National Historic Landmarks by state
- National Register of Historic Places listings in Susquehanna County, Pennsylvania
