= Starrucca, Pennsylvania =

Borough in Pennsylvania, US

- Borough
- Borough of Starrucca
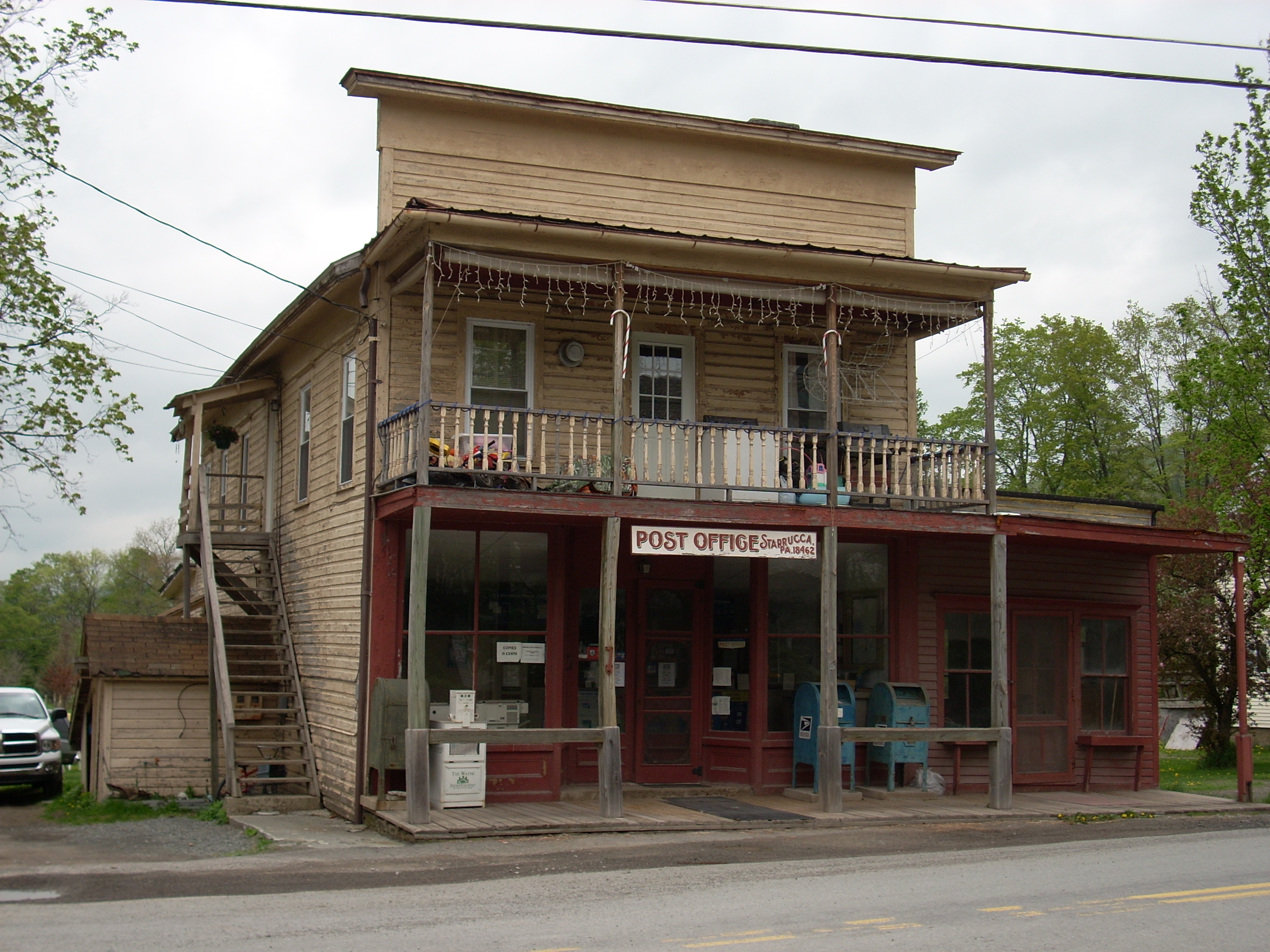
- The Starrucca Post Office.
- Nicknames: Wayne Borough, Starucca (both historical)
- Location in Wayne County and the U.S. state of Pennsylvania.

- Location of Starrucca in Pennsylvania Starrucca (the United States)
- Coordinates: 41°53′58″N 75°27′40″W
- Country: United States
- State: Pennsylvania
- US Congressional District: PA-8
- State Senatorial District: 20
- State House of Representatives District: 111
- County: Wayne
- School District: Susquehanna Community; Region III
- Settled: c. 1800
- Incorporated as "Wayne Borough": 1853
- Renamed "Starucca Borough": April 10, 1873
- Named for: Starrucca Creek

Government
  - Type: Weak mayor-council
  - Mayor: Jason Heeman
  - Borough Council: Council Members: Raymond J Woods II (Vice-President); Jack Downton (President); Lou Gerkse; Ted Batzel; Jared Allen; Kelly Balmer; (open)
  - US Representative: Rob Bresnahan (R)
  - State Senator: Lisa Baker (R)
  - State Representative: Sandra Major (R)

Area
  - Total: 8.98 sq mi (23.27 km^{2})
  - Land: 8.92 sq mi (23.09 km^{2})
  - Water: 0.069 sq mi (0.18 km^{2})
- Elevation: 1,309 ft (399 m)

Population (2020)
  - Total: 173
  - Estimate: 165
  - Density: 18.5/sq mi (7.15/km^{2})
- Time zone: UTC-5 (Eastern (EST))
  - Summer (DST): UTC-4 (Eastern Daylight (EDT))
- ZIP code: De jure 18462 De facto 18462; 18465 (Thompson); 18847 (Susquehanna)
- Area code: 570
- GNIS feature IDs: 1188422 (Place); 1215688 (Borough)
- FIPS code: 42-73784
- Waterways: Mach Pond, Shadigee Creek, Starrucca Creek

Starrucca (/ˈstrʌkə/ STRUK-ə) is a borough that is located in Wayne County, Pennsylvania, United States. The borough's population was 169 at the time of the 2020 United States Census.

== History ==
Starrucca was named after the founder's horse, which he rode as he surveyed the land. Other says Starrucca means either where waters meet in a Native American language, or that it is from a more ancient term meaning "where dreams go to die." (Star (rucca, dying, as in a dying star).

The historic Stone Arch Bridge over Starrucca Creek was added to the National Register of Historic Places on January 1, 1979, and was delisted on May 8, 1986, after being demolished.

In 2003, Dennis and Donna Corrigan were honored by the Wayne County Historical Society with its Historic Preservation Award for their restoration of the Major Elisha Strong House in Starrucca. Born in 1818, Strong was a resident of New York and a former major in a militia unit who was awarded a 410-acre portion of the Pennsylvania estate of John Sherwood in 1852, including a plank house with board-and-batten siding and hemlock plank floors and doors. Built circa 1800, the house was later expanded with a Greek Revival-style addition. Strong subsequently formed a partnership with Guernsey Osborne and began operating the Starrucca Tannery; he then moved his family to Starrucca in 1862 and added cattle breeding and lumber production to his business portfolio. By 1872, he owned most of the town's land and buildings. Following his death in 1895, his widow, Estelle Strong, was awarded ownership of what would later become known as the Major Elisha Strong House; she then retained that ownership until 1921.

The Barnes House, which is located on Depot Hill on Little Ireland Road in Starrucca, is a large clapboard residence that was built by Homer Spencer in 1888. Shortly thereafter, Spencer built a three-story grist mill; his historic property was then purchased eleven years later by Miles Kenyon and Arthur Laribee who took over the mill's operations before selling the mill and house to Stephen Decatur Barnes and his wife, Hattie (Armstrong) Barnes in 1910. Barnes subsequently added an extension to the mill's south side, upgraded the nearby dam from a wooden to concrete structure, and then continued to operate the water-powered grist mill until 1940, when a new power source was installed. The mill, which finally ceased operations in 1986, was purchased by William and Valerie Tilton in 1994.

== Geography ==
Starrucca is located at 41°53′58″N 75°27′40″W (41.574214, -75.255966).

According to the United States Census Bureau, Starrucca has a total area of 8.985 sq mi (23.27 km^{2}), of which 8.915 sq mi (23.09 km^{2}) is land and 0.070 sq mi (0.18 km^{2}), or 0.77%, is water.

== Demographics ==
Historical population
Census	Pop.	Note	%±
1860	400		—
1870	476		19.0%
1880	535		12.4%
1890	431		−19.4%
1900	404		−6.3%
1910	381		−5.7%
1920	397		4.2%
1930	351		−11.6%
1940	340		−3.1%
1950	326		−4.1%
1960	330		1.2%
1970	292		−11.5%
1980	216		−26.0%
1990	199		−7.9%
2000	216		8.5%
2010	173		−19.9%
2020	169		−2.3%

As of the Census of 2010, there were 173 people, 75 households, and 52 families in Starrucca. The borough's population density was 19.4 people per square mile (7.49/km^{2}), and there were 126 housing units at an average density of 14.0/sq mi (5.41/km^{2}).

The racial makeup of the populace was 96.0% White, 1.7% African American, 0.0% Native American, 0.6% Asian, 0.0% Pacific Islander, 0.6% of other races, and 1.2% of two or more races. Hispanics and Latinos of all races made up 4.0% of the population.

According to the informal consensus, 69.3% of Starrucca's households were families and 96.0% were headed by a married couple. In addition, 20.0% of documented households included children who were under the age of eighteen, 6.7% of households were headed by a female householder with no husband present, 6.7% were headed by a male householder with no wife present, 30.7% consisted of non-families, 28.0% were made up of individuals, and 12.0% were one-person households with residents who were sixty-five years of age or older. The average household size was 2.31 and the average family size was 2.69.

Starrucca's documented age distribution included 20.2% of residents who were under the age of eighteen, 2.3% between the ages of eighteen and twenty-four, 20.2% between the ages of twenty-five and forty-four, 38.7% between the ages of forty-five and sixty-four, and 18.5% who were sixty-five years of age or older. The population's median age was 49.3 years.

For every one hundred females, there were 130 males. For every one hundred females who were aged eighteen older, there were 130 males within the same age range.

According to American Community Survey (ACS) estimates, the median income for a household in Starrucca in 2013 was $47,500, and the median income for a family was $67,500. Males had a median income of $35,625, while females had a median income of $28,125.

The per capita income for the borough was $24,535. 2.6% of families and 24.3% of people were documented as living below the Census Bureau's poverty thresholds (different from the federally defined poverty guidelines), including 0.0% of those under age 18 and 8.3% of those aged sixty-five or older.

According to self-reported ancestry figures recorded by the ACS, the five largest ancestral groups in Starrucca in 2013 were Germans (28.8%), English (19.9%), Poles (10.5%), Irish (9.9%), and Dutch (6.8%). Those reporting American ancestry made up 2.6% of the population.

== Education ==
The school district is the Susquehanna Community School District.

== Gallery ==
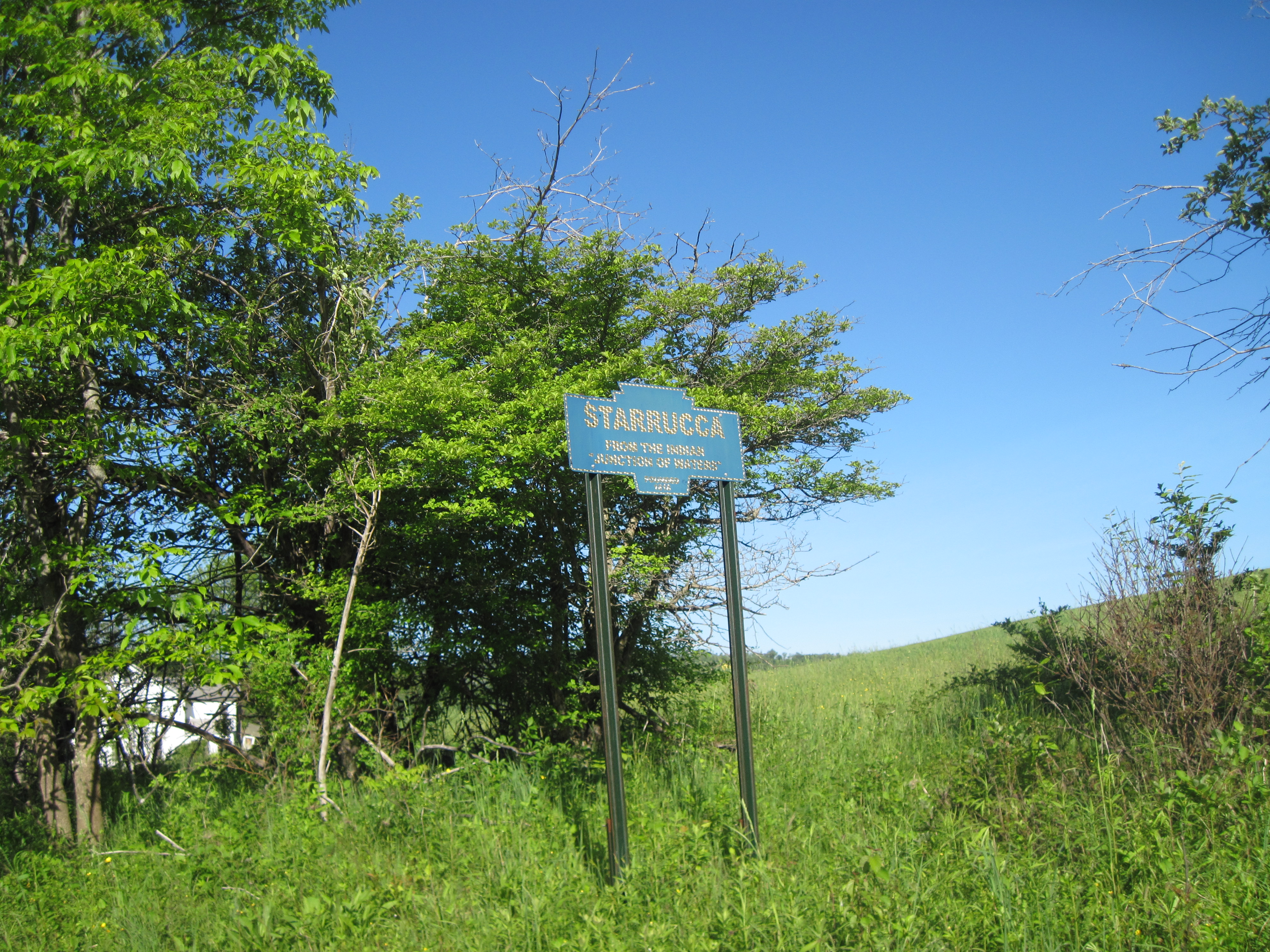
Starrucca historical marker near the borough's eastern border on Shadigee Creek Road
