= Susquehanna Depot, Pennsylvania =

Borough in Pennsylvania, US

Susquehanna Depot, Pennsylvania Susquehanna, Pennsylvania
- Borough
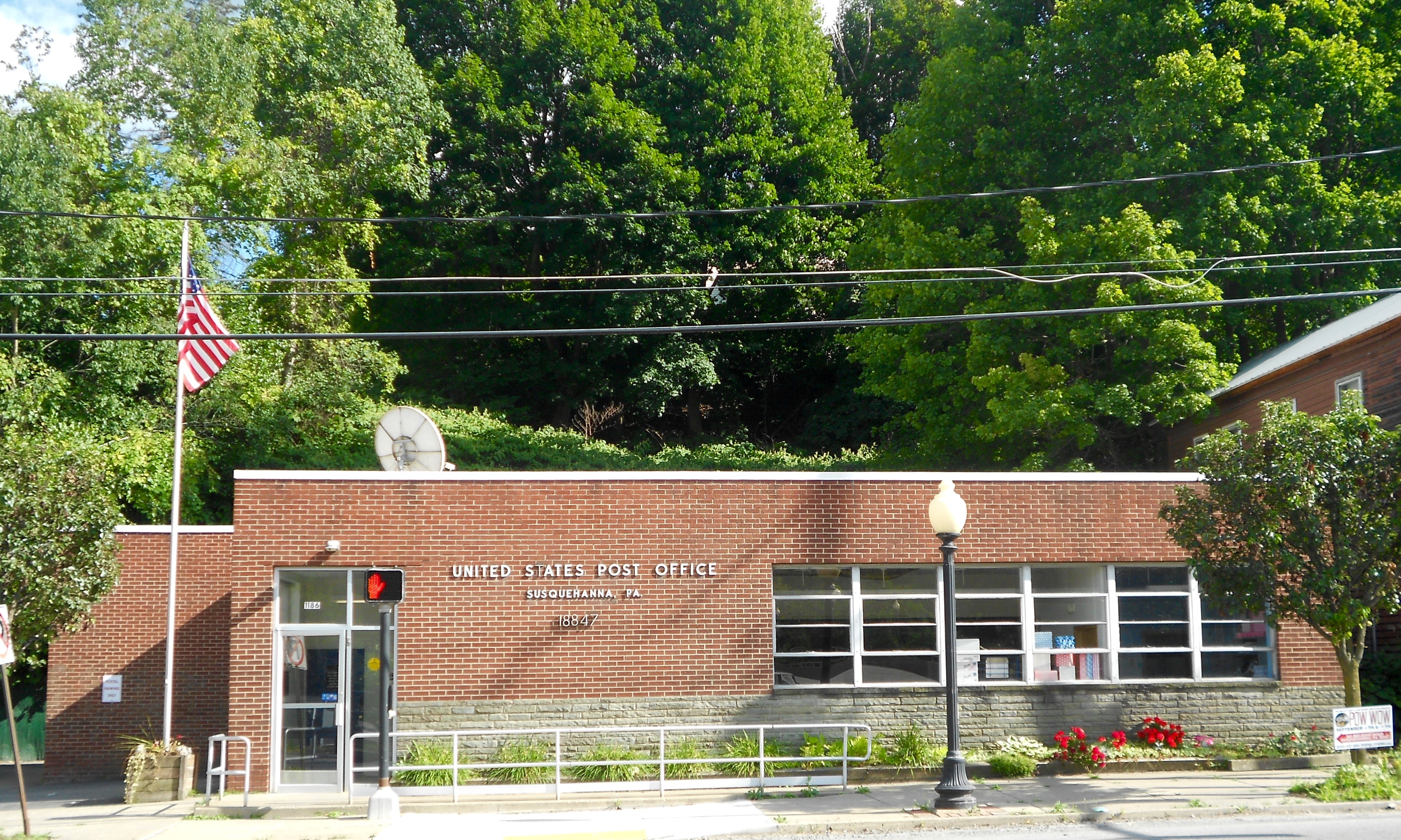
- Post Office on Main Street

- Location of Susquehanna Depot in Susquehanna County, Pennsylvania.

- Location in Pennsylvania Susquehanna Depot (the United States)
- Coordinates: 41°56′41″N 75°36′14″W
- Country: United States
- State: Pennsylvania
- County: Susquehanna
- Borough Council: 1794
- Incorporated: 1853

Government
  - Mayor: Kevin McKee

Area
  - Total: 0.79 sq mi (2.05 km^{2})
  - Land: 0.74 sq mi (1.91 km^{2})
  - Water: 0.054 sq mi (0.14 km^{2})

Population (2020)
  - Total: 1,365
  - Density: 1,852.2/sq mi (715.15/km^{2})
- Time zone: UTC-5 (EST)
  - Summer (DST): UTC-4 (EDT)
- Zip Code: 18847
- Area code: 570
- FIPS code: 42-75568
- Website: https://susquehannaborough.com/

Susquehanna Depot, often referred to simply as Susquehanna, is a borough in Susquehanna County, Pennsylvania, United States, located on the Susquehanna River 23 miles (37 km) southeast of Binghamton, New York. In the past, railroad locomotives and railroad cars were made here. It is also known for its Pennsylvania Bluestone quarries.

The behavioral scientist B. F. Skinner was born in Susquehanna. The American writer John Gardner lived the last few years of his life in Susquehanna, where he died in a motorcycle accident in 1982.

The borough population was 1,365 as of the 2020 census.

== History ==
The New York and Erie Railroad (later reorganized as the Erie Railroad) built a rail line through the county in 1848, including the Starrucca Viaduct: a monumental stone structure spanning Starrucca Creek. Concurrently, the railroad established workshops in what would eventually be known as Susquehanna Depot. Initially, 350 workers were employed. The line opened for traffic in 1851.

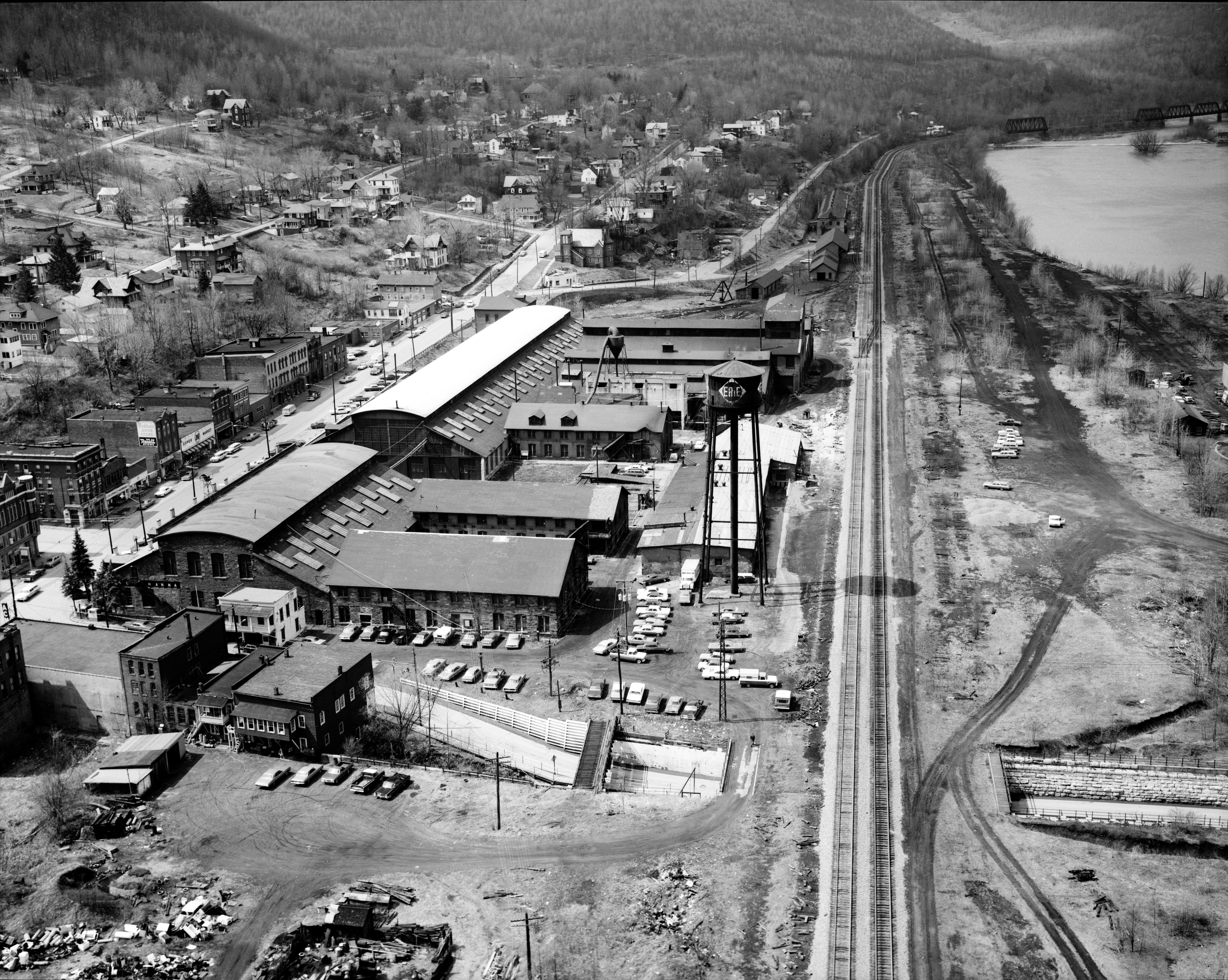
Erie Railroad shops, built 1864–66 along Main and Drinker Streets. The shops were demolished between 1980 and 1982.

The borough was incorporated on August 19, 1853, from part of Harmony Township. In 1863, the Erie shops were expanded to cover 8 acres (3.2 ha) and they employed 700 workers by 1865, and later over 1,000. The complex included a 33-stall roundhouse, a rail yard, a foundry, gas works, oil works and offices. By 1887, the shops were producing five locomotives per month. The Susquehanna railroad station, which included a large hotel called the Starrucca House, opened in 1865.

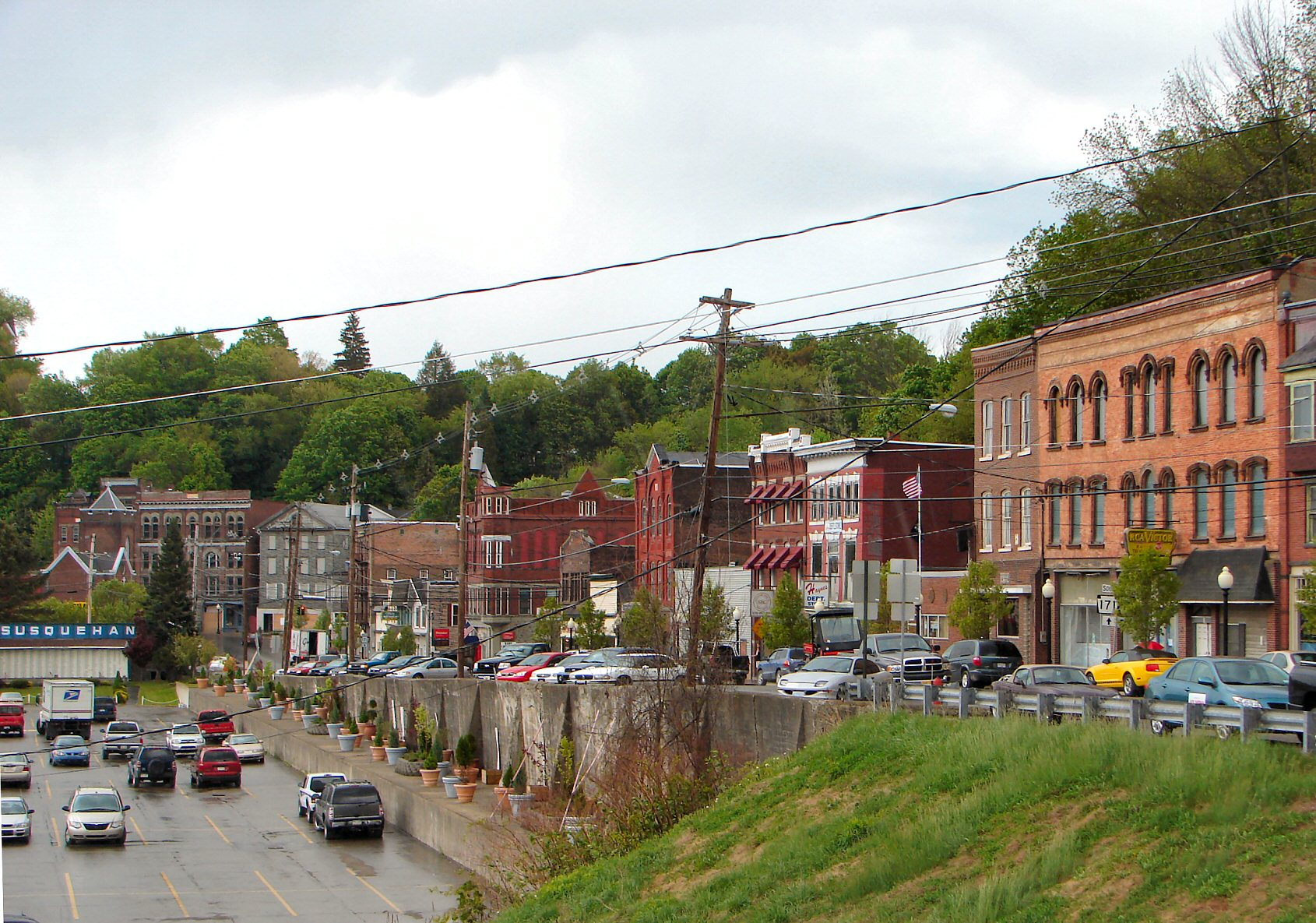
Main Street in Susquehanna Depot

The railroad converted the Starrucca House to offices and staff housing c. 1903. A new roundhouse complex was constructed between 1904 and 1911, and other shop buildings were added through the 1920s. In 1928, the railroad relocated its locomotive shops to Hornell, New York, and moved other shops out of Susquehanna in 1929, but retained a coach shop with reduced staffing through the 1950s. In 1952, Erie closed the roundhouse as it converted its steam locomotive roster to diesel locomotives. By the end of the decade, Erie had moved all of its remaining shop operations to Meadville.

Erie merged into the Erie–Lackawanna Railroad (EL) in 1960, and the latter ended passenger train service through Susquehanna on November 27, 1966. EL went bankrupt in 1972 and was absorbed into Conrail in 1976. Most of the railroad shop buildings were demolished in 1980 and 1981.

With the demise of the local railroad industry, Susquehanna now has many small resident-owned businesses scattered along Main Street. Recent renovations to several Main Street buildings mark the first significant upturn in the local economy in several decades.

The Susquehanna station was added to the National Register of Historic Places in 1972.

== Geography ==
Susquehanna Depot is located at 41°56′41″N 75°36′14″W (41.944601, -75.604025).

According to the United States Census Bureau, the borough has a total area of 0.83 square miles (2.1 km^{2}), of which 0.77 square miles (2.0 km^{2}) is land and 0.06 square miles (0.16 km^{2}) (7.23%) is water.

== Demographics ==
Historical population
Census	Pop.	Note	%±
1860	2,080		—
1870	2,729		31.2%
1880	3,467		27.0%
1890	3,872		11.7%
1900	3,813		−1.5%
1910	3,478		−8.8%
1920	3,764		8.2%
1930	3,203		−14.9%
1940	2,740		−14.5%
1950	2,646		−3.4%
1960	2,591		−2.1%
1970	2,319		−10.5%
1980	1,994		−14.0%
1990	1,760		−11.7%
2000	1,690		−4.0%
2010	1,643		−2.8%
2020	1,365		−16.9%
U.S. Decennial Census

As of the census of 2010, there were 1,643 people, 636 households, and 436 families residing in the borough. The population density was 2,133.8 inhabitants per square mile (823.9/km^{2}). There were 767 housing units at an average density of 996.1 per square mile (384.6/km^{2}). The racial makeup of the borough was 97.1% White, 0.4% African American, 0.3% American Indian or Alaska Native, 1% Asian, 0.4% some other race, and 0.8% from two or more races. Hispanic or Latino of any race were 2% of the population.

There were 636 households, out of which 32.4% had children under the age of 18 living with them, 41.8% were married couples living together, 19.3% had a female householder with no husband present, and 31.4% were non-families. 26.4% of all households were made up of individuals, and 10.1% had someone living alone who was 65 years of age or older. The average household size was 2.50 and the average family size was 2.99.

In the borough, the population was spread out, with 25.1% under the age of 18, 60.4% from 18 to 64, and 14.5% who were 65 years of age or older. The median age was 38 years.

The median income for a household in the borough was $35,197, and the median income for a family was $42,422. Males had a median income of $33,929 versus $27,969 for females. The per capita income for the borough was $17,637. About 16.6% of families and 20.8% of the population were below the poverty line, including 27.8% of those under age 18 and 10.8% of those age 65 or over.

== Notable people ==
- Charles Pickering (1805–1878), naturalist, born in Susquehanna Depot
- Burrhus Frederic Skinner (1904–1990), psychologist, behaviorist, born in Susquehanna Depot
- John Champlin Gardner Jr. (1933–1982), novelist, and essayist

== See also ==
- List of Erie Railroad structures documented by the Historic American Engineering Record
