= Susquehanna station =

Railway station in Susquehanna, Pennsylvania, United States

Susquehanna
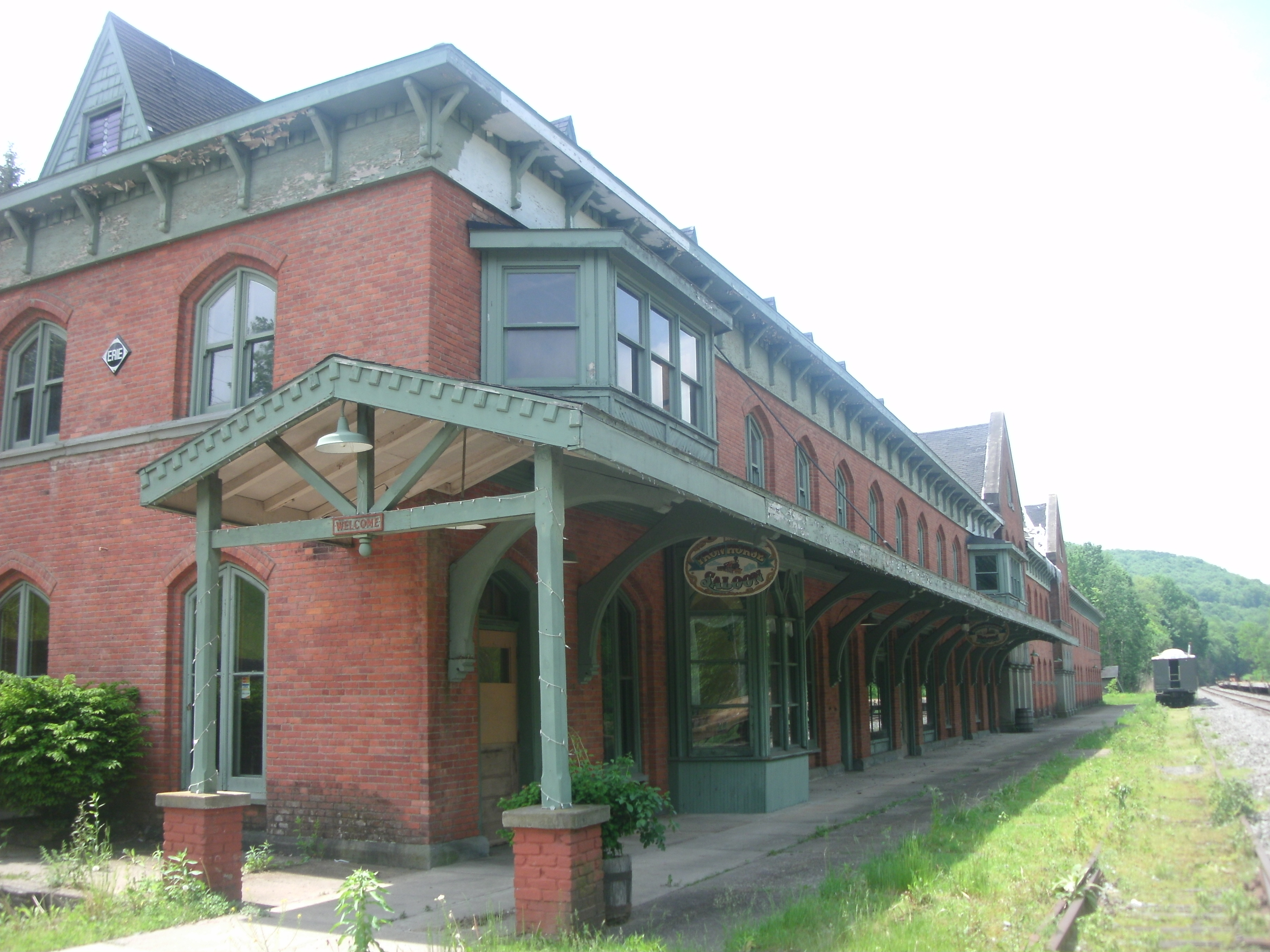
- The station depot at Susquehanna, as seen in May 2011, from the Pavonia Terminal-bound track, 148 years after construction of the depot.

General information
- Coordinates: 41°56′41.1″N 75°36′34.9″W
- Owner: Erie Railroad (1851–1960) Erie Lackawanna Railroad (1960–1976) Conrail
- Lines: Main Line (Mahoning Division); Mahoning Division First Sub-Division
- Platforms: 1 side platform
- Tracks: 2

Other information
- Station code: 3303

History
- Opened: 1851; 175 years ago
- Closed: 1966; 60 years ago
- Rebuilt: 1863; 163 years ago

Former services
Preceding station	Erie Railroad	Following station
Hickory Grove toward Chicago	Main Line	Gulf Summit toward Jersey City
Terminus	Jefferson Division	Lanesboro toward Carbondale
Location

The Erie Railroad Station in Susquehanna, Pennsylvania was built by the Erie Railway (later reorganized as the Erie Railroad) in 1863. The three-story Gothic Revival structure included a large hotel, called Starrucca House, with rooms for 200 people and a 120 feet (37 m) long dining room. Overall building size is 327 feet (100 m) length by 40 feet (12 m) width.

The railroad converted the hotel into offices and sleeping quarters for railroad personnel c. 1903. Alterations were made to the building in 1913 and 1917. The Erie Railroad merged into the Erie Lackawanna Railroad in 1960, which ended passenger train service over the former Erie Delaware Division through Susquehanna in 1966. The last passenger trains were the Atlantic Express/Pacific Express and unnamed trains to Binghamton timed to meet up with the Phoebe Snow. All remaining passenger service, on the former Lackawanna route via Scranton, Pennsylvania, was discontinued on January 6, 1970. The station was listed on the National Register of Historic Places in 1972.

== History ==
=== The Erie enters Susquehanna ===
The New York, Lake Erie and Western Railway constructed the railroad through a dense forest in 1848 as a central spot for their work between Piermont and Dunkirk, New York. At that point, the village was nameless and had only one farm on the land nearby. That year, the railroad purchased 300 acres (120 ha) along the Susquehanna River for repair shops and other necessary facilities. Constructions at Susquehanna included the large machine shop, (774 feet (236 m) by 138 feet (42 m)) with room for up to 40 locomotives; the boiler shop; blacksmith's shop; pattern shop; paint shop; foundry; and engine rooms for them. The facilities included a larger lecture hall for workers, with a capacity of 600 people.

The Erie also constructed the Starrucca House, which contained a dining hall that was 120 feet (37 m) by 40 feet (12 m) and was a hotel for passengers. The construction of the Starrucca House was necessary as a layover stop for engines coming out of Gulf Summit, New York that had to deal with the steep grade. The depot could feed 200 people and provide room as a hotel for the same number of people. This was the first depot constructed entirely out of brick in the United States, containing a 2,400-volume library, a reading room and the lecture room.

By 1863, the shops in Susquehanna employed 700 men (up from the original 350) in the community with a $38,000/year total payroll. The master mechanic of the shops, James Gregg, worked to renovate and improve the shops, which were consistent fire risks. Construction of the shops began that year at a cost of $1.25 million (1865 USD), along with $500,000 in tools and machinery, on an 8-acre (3.2 ha) site.

=== March 1874 strike ===
In March 1874, the Erie fell behind paying its workers at the Susquehanna shops. On March 15, the day the railroad promised that it would pay its workers, they announced that finances were even worse and would have to delay the payment until March 25. The workers at the shop agreed with the delay, but stated that they were willing to walk off the job on March 25 if they were not paid. That day, the Erie announced that they had to pay workers on other parts of the railroad. Denied their wages, the railroad shop workers told the managers to leave the premises and took over the facilities. They demanded that, if the railroad did not pay within 24 hours, they would begin to stop trains from running.

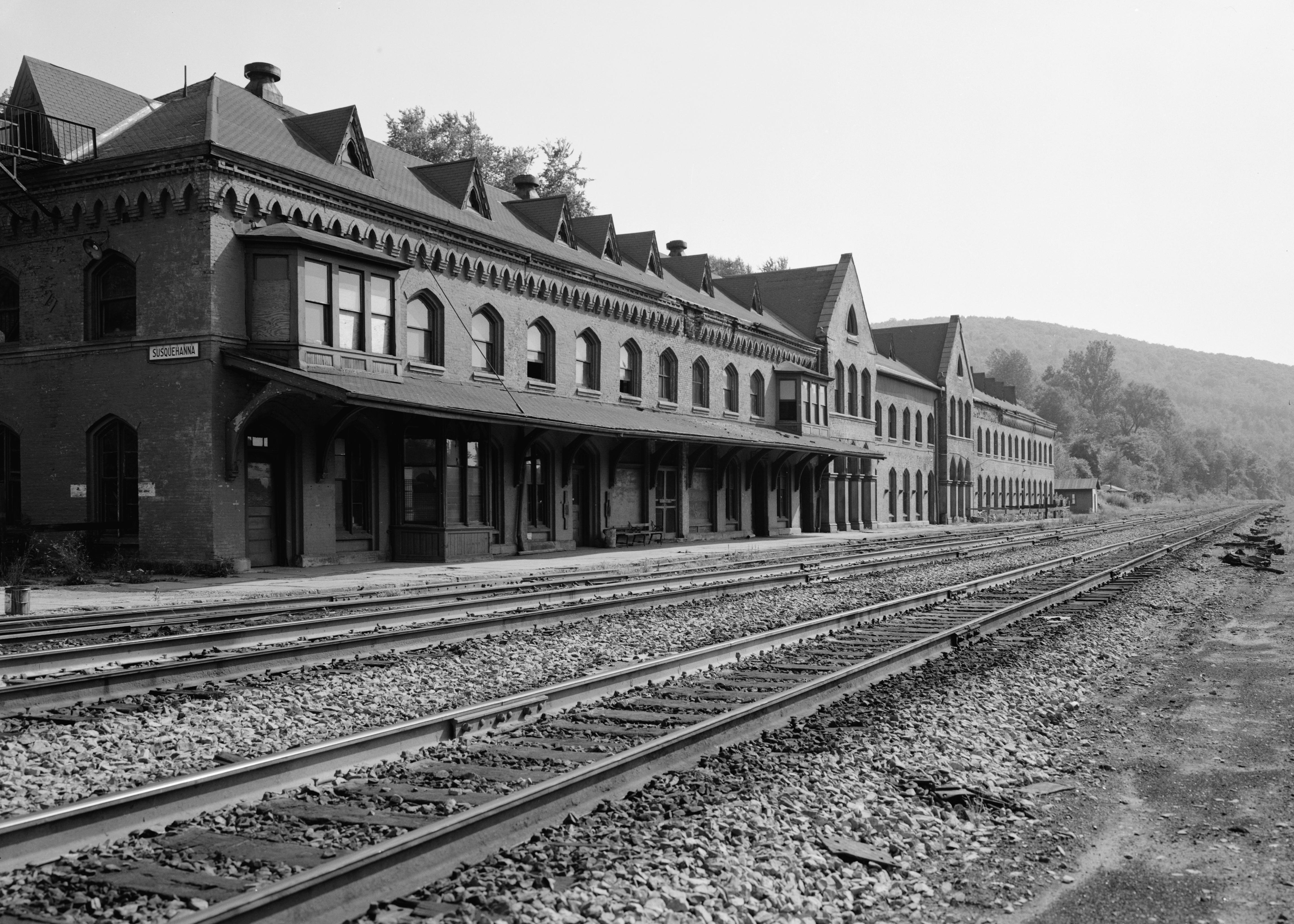
Susquehanna station in 1971

The railroad responded by firing the leaders of the strike at Susquehanna, which caused things to get worse. The shop workers disabled locomotives and put them in a roundhouse, while stranding cars of coal and fuel on sidings in the area. Workers kept mechanical pieces of engines hostage and put them elsewhere in the town. The railroad was on the attack end of the media and the government, who sympathized with the workers. M.M. Helme, the local Sheriff, refused to have the strikers chased off the property. The Governor of Pennsylvania, John F. Hartranft told the railroad that only the Sheriff could request state troops to come in and the latter refused to do so, along with several leading citizens of the village.

The lawyers of the railroad soon learned that the trains down the line were being affected by the strike, only then causing Helme to call-in troops. The railroad offered that, in ending the strike, all but the spokespeople for the strike would get their jobs back, which was refused. With that refusal, the railroad threatened to move its shops to Elmira, New York, which would affect the local economy, causing their support to dwindle further. The strike ended within hours of that, with workers returning to their jobs.

== See also ==
- List of Erie Railroad structures documented by the Historic American Engineering Record
