= Starrucca Creek =

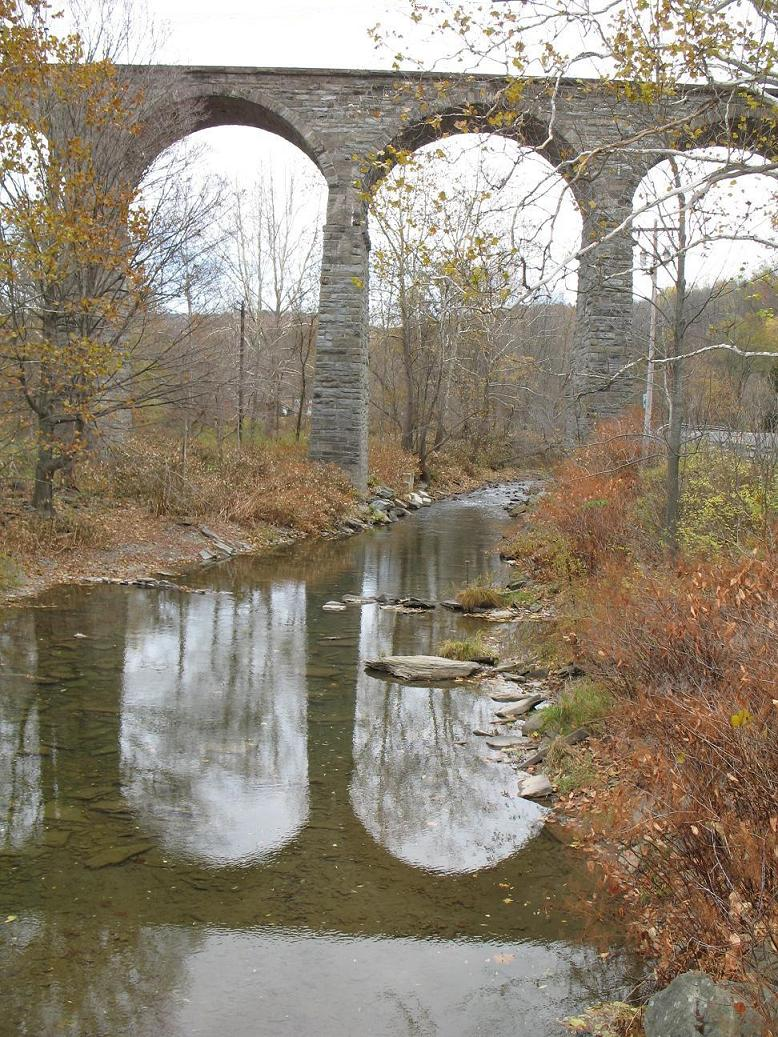
- Starrucca Creek flowing under Starrucca Viaduct

- Location of the mouth of Starrucca Creek Starrucca Creek (the United States)

Location
- Country: United States
- State: Pennsylvania

Physical characteristics
- Mouth: Susquehanna River
  - location: Near Lanesboro
  - coordinates: 41°55′41″N 75°31′00″W
- Length: 18.1 mi (29.1 km)

Basin features
- Progression: Starrucca Creek → Susquehanna River → Chesapeake Bay → Atlantic Ocean

Starrucca Creek is an 18.1-mile-long (29.1 km) tributary of the Susquehanna River in Susquehanna and Wayne counties, Pennsylvania in the United States. Shadigee Creek joins Starrucca Creek just downstream of Starrucca. Soon after passing under the Starrucca Viaduct, Starrucca Creek joins the Susquehanna near the borough of Lanesboro.

The former Stone Arch Bridge crossed Starrucca Creek at the borough of Starrucca.

== See also ==
- List of rivers of Pennsylvania
