= Starrucca Viaduct =

Bridge in Lanesboro, Pennsylvania

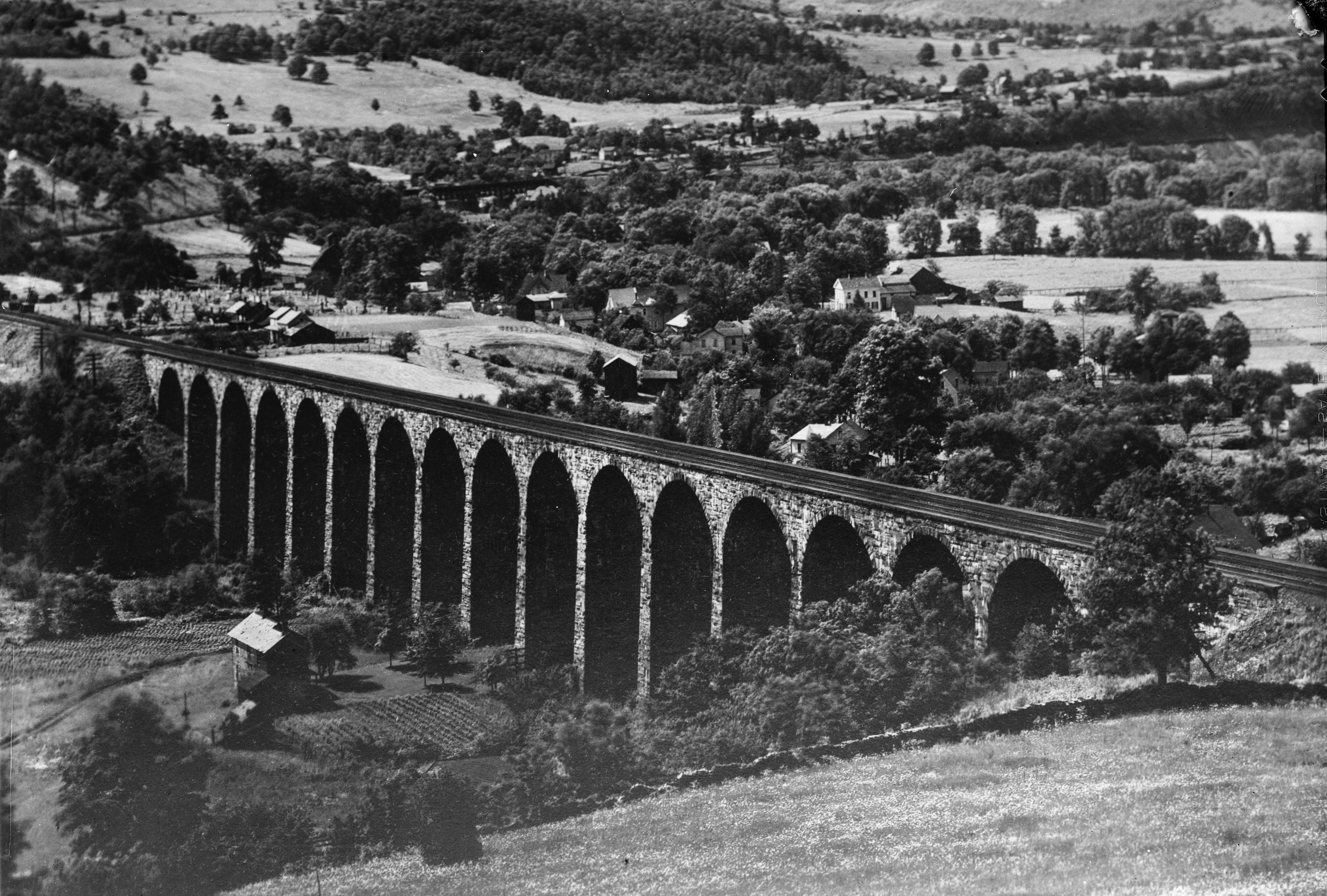
- A 1920 picture of the Starrucca Viaduct
- Coordinates: 41.9632°N 75.5833°W
- Carries: Two tracks of the New York, Susquehanna and Western Railway
- Crosses: Starrucca Creek
- Locale: Lanesboro, Pennsylvania
- Maintained by: New York, Susquehanna and Western Railway

Characteristics
- Design: Stone arch bridge
- Total length: 1,040 feet (320 m)
- Width: Two tracks
- Longest span: Seventeen spans of 50 feet (15 m)
- Clearance below: 100 feet (30 m)

History
- Opened: 1848

Location
- Interactive map of Starrucca Viaduct

Starrucca Viaduct is a stone arch bridge that spans Starrucca Creek near Lanesboro, Pennsylvania, in the United States. Completed in 1848 at a cost of $320,000 (equal to $11,907,692 today), it was at the time the world's largest stone railway viaduct and was thought to be the most expensive railway bridge as well. Still in use, the viaduct is listed on the National Register of Historic Places and is designated as a National Historic Civil Engineering Landmark.

== History ==
=== 19th century ===
The viaduct was designed by Julius W. Adams and James P. Kirkwood and built in 1847–48 by the New York and Erie Railroad, of locally-quarried random ashlar bluestone, except for three brick interior longitudinal spandrel walls and the concrete bases of the piers. This may have been the first structural use of concrete in American bridge construction.

It was built to solve an engineering problem posed by the wide valley of Starrucca Creek. The railroad considered building an embankment, but abandoned the idea as impractical. The Erie Railroad was well-financed by British investors but, even with money available, most American contractors at the time were incapable of the task. Julius W. Adams, the superintending engineer of construction in the area, hired James P. Kirkwood, a civil engineer who had worked on the Long Island Rail Road. Accounts differ as to whether Kirkwood worked on the bridge himself, or whether Adams was responsible for the plans with Kirkwood working as a subordinate. The lead stonemason, Thomas Heavey, an Irish immigrant from County Offaly, worked on other projects for Kirkwood, primarily in New England. It took 800 workers, each paid about $1 per day, equal to $37.21 today, to complete the bridge in a year. The falsework for the bridge required more than half a million feet of cord and hewn timbers.

The original single broad gauge track was replaced by two standard gauge tracks in 1886. The roadbed deck under the tracks was reinforced with a layer of concrete in 1958.

The bridge has been in continuous use for more than a century and a half.

=== 20th century ===
The viaduct was designated as a National Historic Civil Engineering Landmark by the American Society of Civil Engineers in 1973 and was listed on the National Register of Historic Places in 1975.

=== 21st century ===
In 2005, the Norfolk Southern Railway leased the portion of the line from Port Jervis to Binghamton, New York, to the Delaware Otsego Corporation, which operates it under the name Central New York Railway. The only railroad currently using it is Delaware Otsego's New York, Susquehanna and Western Railway.

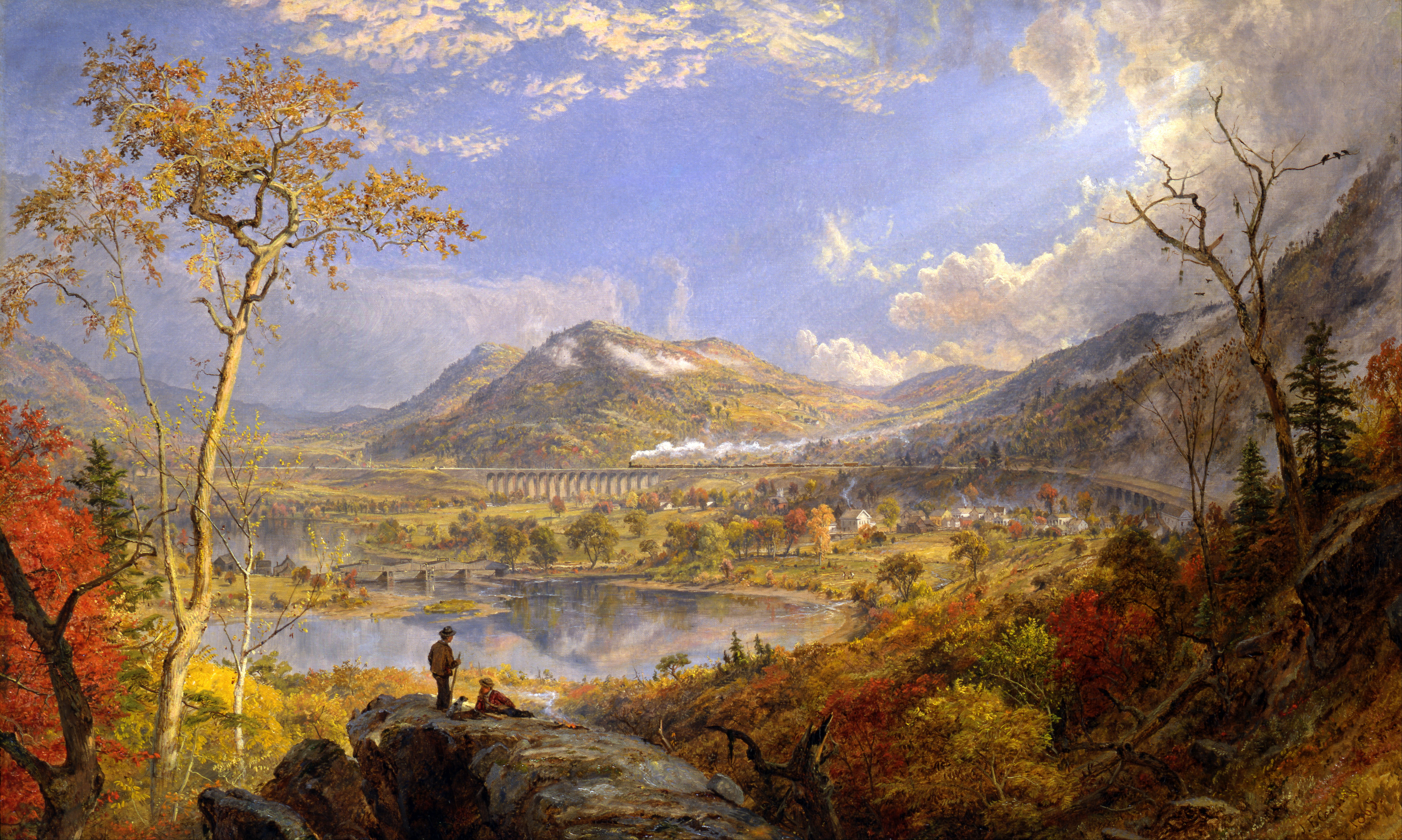
Starruca Viaduct, Pennsylvania, 1865, by Jasper Francis Cropsey

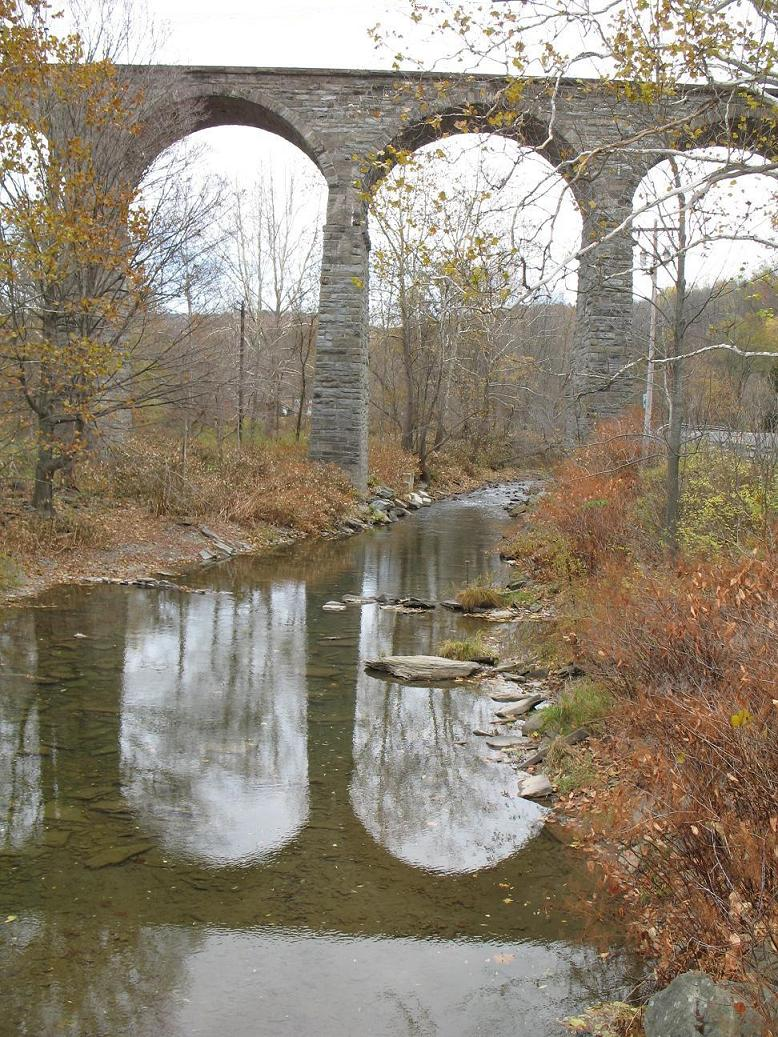
October 2009

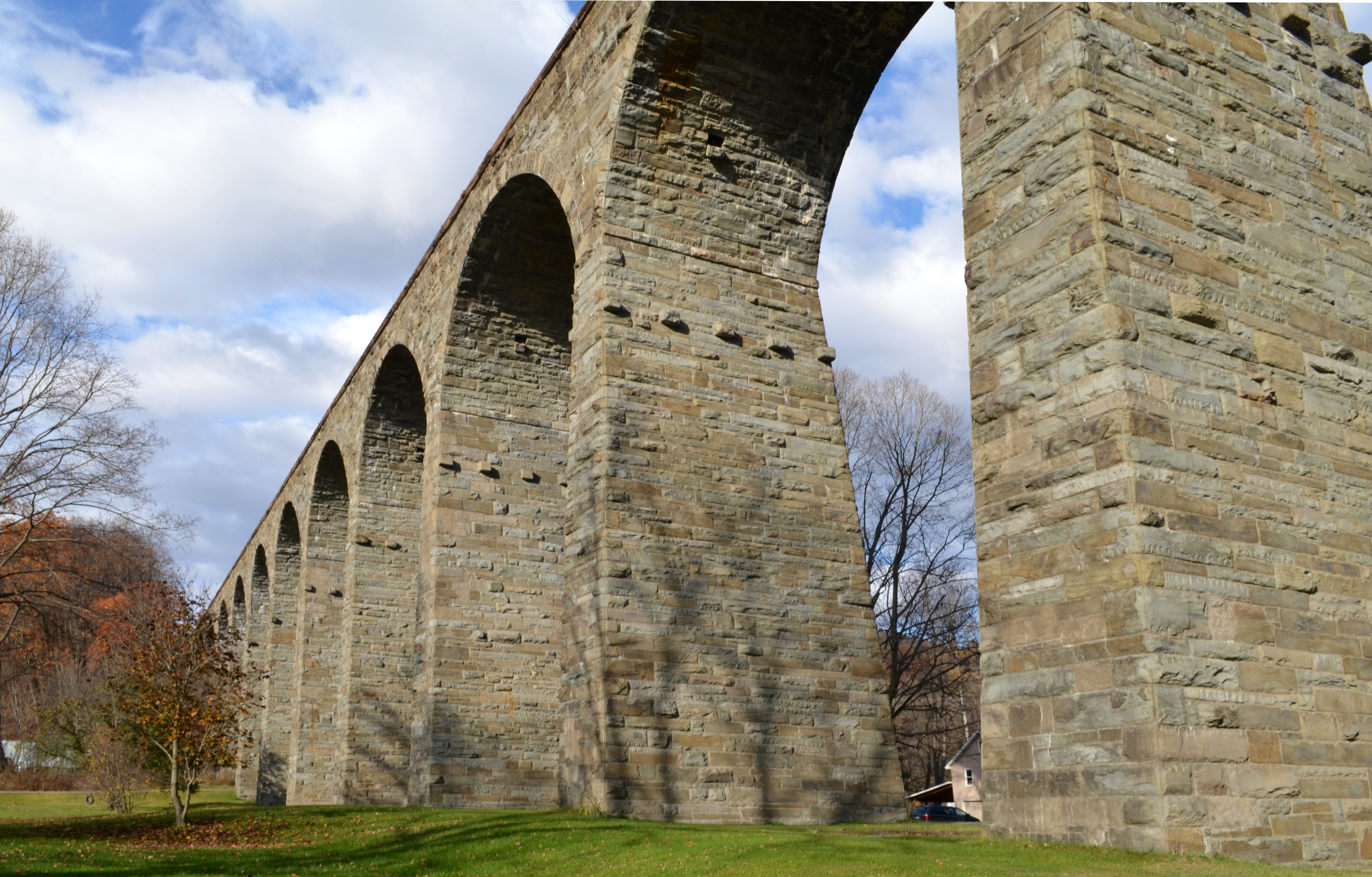
October 2014

== See also ==
- List of bridges documented by the Historic American Engineering Record in Pennsylvania
- List of Erie Railroad structures documented by the Historic American Engineering Record
- List of Pennsylvania state historical markers in Susquehanna County
