= Lanesboro, Pennsylvania =

Borough in Pennsylvania, US

- Borough
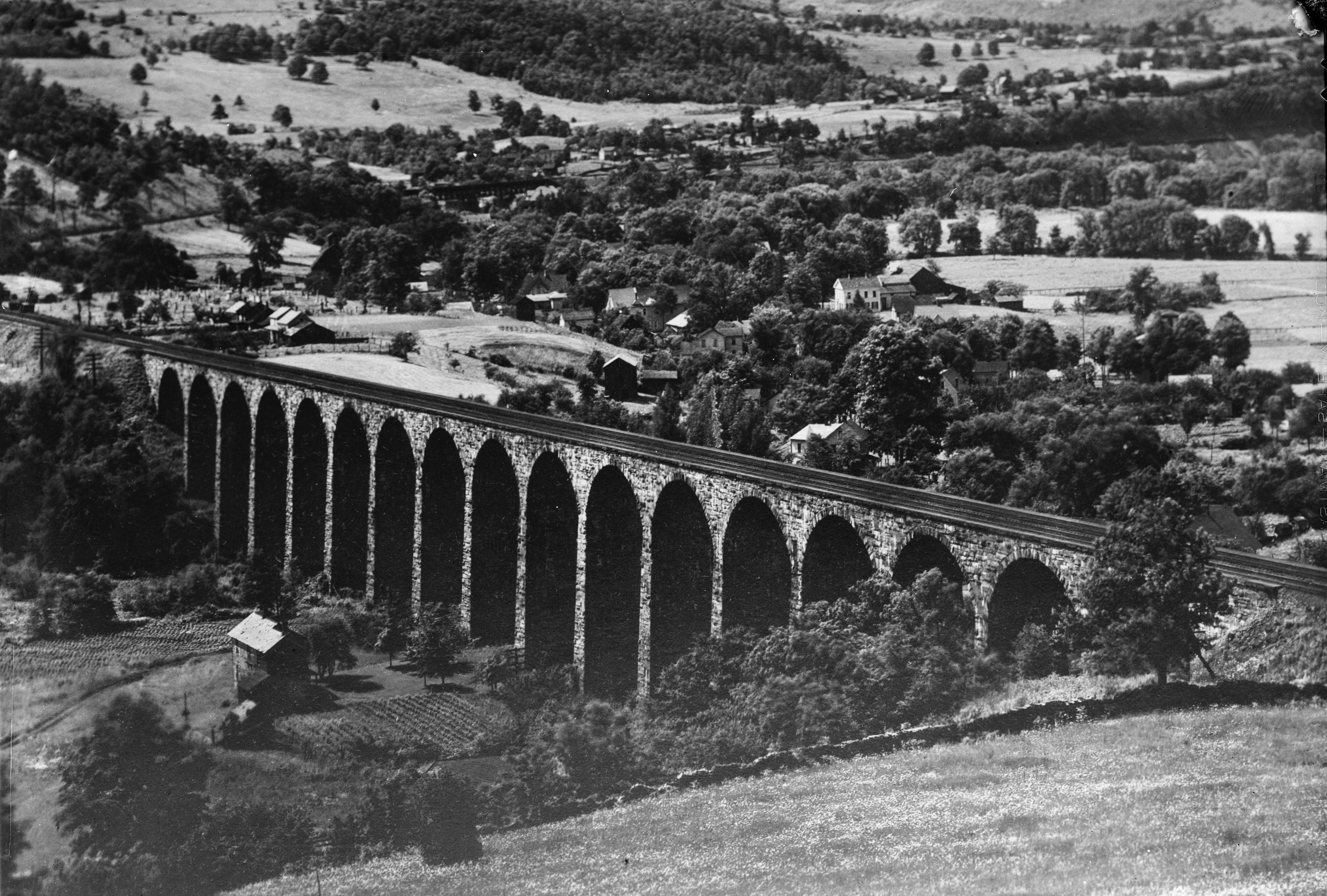
- Starrucca Viaduct

- Location of Lanesboro in Susquehanna County, Pennsylvania.

- Location in Pennsylvania Lanesboro (the United States)
- Coordinates: 41°57′48″N 75°34′55″W
- Country: United States
- State: Pennsylvania
- County: Susquehanna
- Established: 1888

Government
  - Mayor: Chris Maby

Area
  - Total: 2.68 sq mi (6.95 km^{2})
  - Land: 2.62 sq mi (6.78 km^{2})
  - Water: 0.066 sq mi (0.17 km^{2})

Population (2020)
  - Total: 508
  - Density: 194.1/sq mi (74.94/km^{2})
- Time zone: UTC-5 (EST)
  - Summer (DST): UTC-4 (EDT)
- Zip Code: 18827, 18847
- Area code: 570
- FIPS code: 42-41336
- Website: lanesboropa.weebly.com

Lanesboro is a borough in Susquehanna County, Pennsylvania, United States. The population was 485 at the 2020 census.

== History ==
Lanesboro was named for Martin Lane, an early settler who first called it Lanesville. The name was changed to Lanesboro by his son Jesse Lane. Lanesboro was incorporated as a borough in 1889.

The Starrucca Viaduct was added to the National Register of Historic Places in 1975.

== Geography ==
Lanesboro is located at 41°57′48″N 75°34′55″W (41.963293, -75.582034).

According to the United States Census Bureau, the borough has a total area of 2.66 square miles (6.9 km^{2}), of which 2.6 square miles (6.7 km^{2}) is land and 0.06 square miles (0.16 km^{2}) (2.26%) is water.

== Demographics ==
Historical population
| Census | Pop. | Note | %± |
|---|---|---|---|
| 1880 | 348 | | — |
| 1890 | 876 | | 151.7% |
| 1900 | 821 | | −6.3% |
| 1910 | 771 | | −6.1% |
| 1920 | 805 | | 4.4% |
| 1930 | 731 | | −9.2% |
| 1940 | 637 | | −12.9% |
| 1950 | 591 | | −7.2% |
| 1960 | 502 | | −15.1% |
| 1970 | 550 | | 9.6% |
| 1980 | 465 | | −15.5% |
| 1990 | 659 | | 41.7% |
| 2000 | 588 | | −10.8% |
| 2010 | 506 | | −13.9% |
| 2020 | 508 | | 0.4% |
| 2021 (est.) | 482 | ▼ | −5.1% |

=== 2000 census ===
At the 2000 census there were 588 people, 248 households, and 149 families living in the borough. The population density was 230.6 inhabitants per square mile (89.0/km^{2}). There were 278 housing units at an average density of 109.0 per square mile (42.1/km^{2}). The racial makeup of the borough was 97.79% White, 0.17% Native American, 1.53% Asian, 0.17% Pacific Islander, and 0.34% from two or more races. Hispanic or Latino of any race were 0.68%.

Of the 248 households 29.8% had children under the age of 18 living with them, 45.2% were married couples living together, 8.9% had a female householder with no husband present, and 39.9% were non-families. 33.9% of households were one person and 25.0% were one person aged 65 or older. The average household size was 2.37 and the average family size was 3.04.

The age distribution was 25.7% under the age of 18, 5.3% from 18 to 24, 24.5% from 25 to 44, 24.3% from 45 to 64, and 20.2% 65 or older. The median age was 42 years. For every 100 females, there were 80.4 males. For every 100 females age 18 and over, there were 75.5 males.

The median household income was $27,727 and the median family income was $34,844. Males had a median income of $30,750 versus $20,577 for females. The per capita income for the borough was $13,873. About 9.7% of families and 19.5% of the population were below the poverty line, including 17.3% of those under age 18 and 28.3% of those age 65 or over.

=== 2010 census ===
At the 2010 census there were 506 people, 217 households, and 122 families living in the borough. The population density was 194.6 inhabitants per square mile (75.1/km^{2}). There were 243 housing units at an average density of 93.5 per square mile (36.1/km^{2}). The racial makeup of the borough was 96.4% White, 0.4% Black or African American, 0.4% Native American, 0.4% Asian, and 2.4% from two or more races. Of the 217 households 26.7% had children under the age of 18 living with them, 37.8% were married couples living together, 13.4% had a female householder with no husband present, and 43.8% were non-families. 36.9% of households were one person and 24.9% were one person aged 65 or older. The average household size was 2.33 and the average family size was 3.02.

The age distribution was 25.7% under the age of 18, 53.7% from 18 to 64, and 20.6% 65 or older. The median age was 42.5 years.

The median household income was $29,083 and the median family income was $35,179. Males had a median income of $31,141 versus $28,409 for females. The per capita income for the borough was $16,319. About 25.2% of families and 19.6% of the population were below the poverty line, including 16.5% of those under age 18 and 40.9% of those age 65 or over.
