= County Route 9 (Orange County, New York) =

Highway in Orange County, New York, US

County Route 9
- Map of Orange County in southeastern New York with CR 9 highlighted in red and former NY 307 in blue (Section west of CR 9 replaced by CR 107)

Route information
- Maintained by Orange County Public Works
- Length: 10.0 mi (16.1 km)

Major junctions
- South end: NY 32 in Woodbury
- US 9W in Cornwall
- North end: NY 218 in Cornwall

Location
- Country: United States
- State: New York
- County: Orange

Highway system
- County routes in New York; County Routes in Orange County
← NY 306	NY 307	→ NY 308

County Route 9 (CR 9) is a two-lane highway in eastern Orange County, New York, in the United States. The route is 10.0 miles (16.1 km) long, stretching north from an intersection with New York State Route 32 (NY 32) in the hamlet of Central Valley to a junction with NY 218 in the town of Cornwall, just west of the village of Cornwall-on-Hudson. CR 9 passes several historical buildings, such as the Carvey–Gatfield House, Cromwell Manor, the David Sutherland House, and the Sands Ring Homestead Museum.

The northern terminus of CR 9 was originally located at Quaker Avenue in Cornwall, then designated as part of New York State Route 307. NY 307 continued north on Main Street to Hudson Street, where it ended at NY 218. In 1980, ownership and maintenance of NY 307 was transferred to Orange County, and its routing became part of two county routes: an extended CR 9 and the new County Route 107.

== Route description ==
CR 9 begins at an intersection with NY 32 in Central Valley, just north of its intersection with NY 17. The route heads northeastward, passing homes and tree patches. There are intersections with local roads, as CR 9, also known as Smith Clove Road, crosses the New York State Thruway (Interstate 87 or I-87). The road continues, passing Filters Lake and Central Valley Golf Club. Soon afterwards, CR 9 passes through a large patch of forests, which also covers parts of West Point Military Academy.

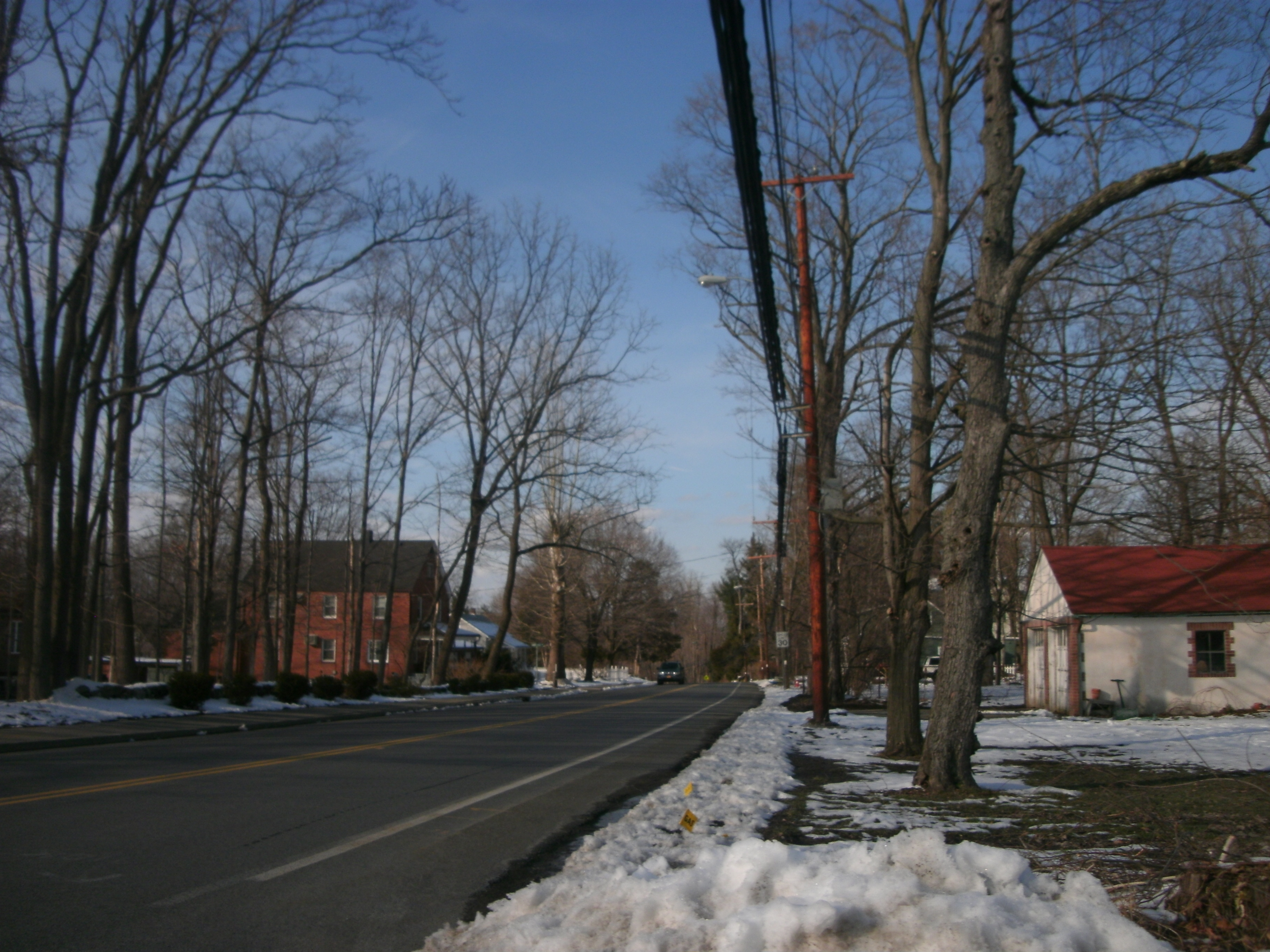
CR 9 eastbound through Cornwall

Smith Clove Road continues, passing forests to the east and homes to the west. The highway parallels I-87 and NY 32, as it progresses farther to the northeast. Soon after, Smith Clove Road becomes full of forests and grass, with homes becoming scarce. CR 34 (Trout Brook Road) terminates at CR 9 while the road continues towards Cornwall. Whispering Brook is afterwards, a small road on the east of CR 9.

CR 9 becomes known as Mineral Springs Road and continues northward through forests. CR 65 (Angola Road) terminates at CR 9 soon after. However, the name Angola Road continues to the north along CR 9. As the highway approaches Cornwall, it becomes more suburbanized, with the Carvey–Gatfield House approachable on the east. With NY 32 parallelling to the north, Angola Road continues into Cornwall. Just before the overpass of U.S. Route 9W (US 9W), CR 9 passes the Cromwell Manor, an early-19th-century house.

Just after the overpass comes the David Sutherland House, a stone structure dating back to 1770. His descendant also has a house along CR 9, Daniel Sutherland House, which is located at the Chadeayne Circle. The highway there continues along Main Street, an urbanized, 3-lane highway until its terminus at NY 218 in Cornwall-on-Hudson.

CR 9 is longer than five state-maintained highways in Orange County. NY 210, NY 284, NY 293, NY 416, and NY 747 are all shorter than CR 9.

== History ==
The original northern terminus of CR 9 was at the intersection of Quaker Avenue, Angola Road, and Main Street in Cornwall. At this intersection, CR 9 met NY 307, a southwest–northeasterly route assigned in the mid-1930s that extended from NY 32 to NY 218 by way of Quaker Avenue, Main Street, and Hudson Street. Meanwhile, the portion of Main Street from Hudson Street (NY 307) to Academy Street (NY 218) was an unsigned, state-maintained highway.

On January 9, 1980, the NY 307 designation was removed from the entirety of its routing. Ownership and maintenance of both NY 307's former routing west of Hudson Street, and Main Street between Hudson Street and NY 218, was transferred from the state of New York to Orange County roughly three months later on April 1 as part of a highway maintenance swap between the two levels of government. Following the swap, CR 9 was extended northward along Main Street to a new terminus at NY 218 while NY 307's former routing along Quaker Avenue was designated as CR 107.

Originally, CR 9's Mineral Springs Road segment had a longer alignment within the forests south of Angola Road. This was realigned and the old alignment became known as Old Mineral Springs Road.

== Major intersections ==
The entire route is in Orange County.

Location	mi	km	Destinations	Notes
Central Valley	0.0	0.0	NY 32	Southern terminus
Cornwall	8.3– 8.5	13.4– 13.7	US 9W	Interchange
Cornwall	10.0	16.1	NY 218 to US 9W	Northern terminus
1.000 mi = 1.609 km; 1.000 km = 0.621 mi
