= Daniel Sutherland (disambiguation) =

Daniel Sutherland (1869–1955) was an American businessman and politician from Alaska.

Daniel Sutherland may also refer to:

- Daniel E. Sutherland, American historian
- Daniel W. Sutherland, American lawyer and government official
- Daniel Sutherland (British politician), British councillor
- Daniel Sutherland Davidson (1900–1952), American anthropologist
- Daniel Sutherland House, residence in Cornwall, New York, United States, listed on the National Register of Historic Places
