= Sutherland House =

Sutherland House may refer to:

== Locations ==
=== England ===
- Sutherland House, Southwold, an inn and restaurant in Southwold, Suffolk, England, a Grade II* listed building in Waveney

=== United States ===
- Langford and Lydia McMichael Sutherland Farmstead, Pittsfield Charter Township, Michigan, listed on the National Register of Historic Places (NRHP) in Washtenaw County
- Sutherland House (Plymouth, Michigan), listed as a Michigan State Historic Site in Wayne County
- D.H. Sutherland House, La Luz, New Mexico, listed on the NRHP in Otero County
- Daniel Sutherland House, Cornwall, New York, listed on the National Register of Historic Places (NRHP)
- David Sutherland House, Cornwall, New York, listed on the NRHP
- Cromwell Manor, also known as the Joseph Sutherland House, Cornwall, New York, listed on the NRHP
- John Sutherland House, Eugene, Oregon, listed on the NRHP
- Sutherland House (Petersburg, Virginia), listed on the NRHP

== Other ==
- Sutherland House Publishing, a Canadian
