= Sutherland School =

Sutherland School may refer to:

- Sutherland School, Sutherland, Saskatoon, Canada
- Sutherland Secondary School, North Vancouver, British Columbia, Canada
- Sutherland High School (disambiguation)
- Scott Sutherland School of Architecture and Built Environment, Robert Gordon University, Aberdeen, Scotland
- Sutherland School of Law, University College Dublin, Ireland

== See also ==
- Category:Schools in Sutherland
- Sutherland (disambiguation)
