= Francis Shober =

Francis Shober may refer to:

- Francis Edwin Shober (1831–1896), U.S. Representative from North Carolina, father of Francis Emanuel Shober
- Francis Emanuel Shober (1860–1919), U.S. Representative from New York, son of Francis Edwin Shober
