= West Potomac Park =

U.S. national park in Washington, D.C.

- U.S. Historic district – Contributing property
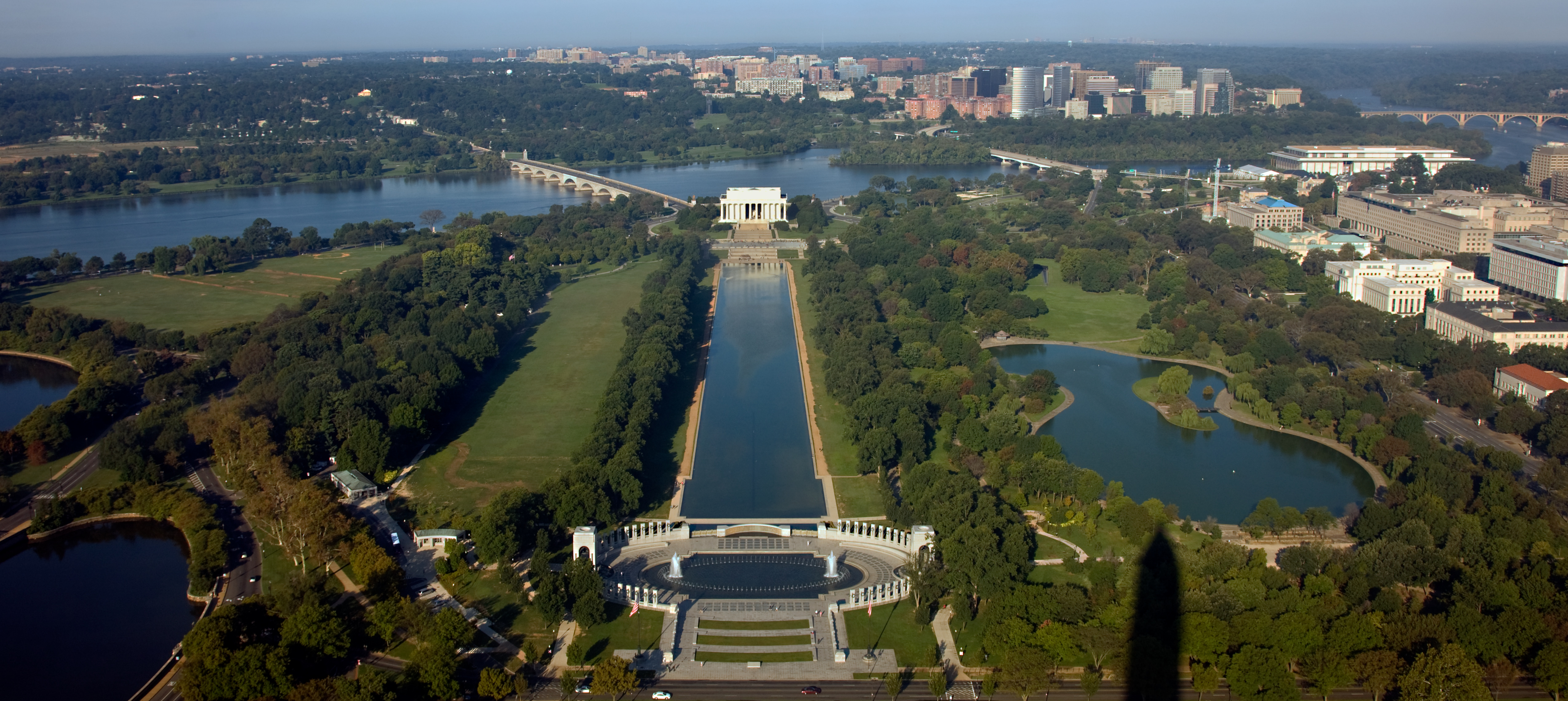
- View of West Potomac Park from the Washington Monument

- Location within the District of Columbia Location within the United States
- Location: Bounded by Constitution Ave., 17th St., Independence Ave., Washington Channel, Potomac River, and Rock Creek Park, N.W.
- Coordinates: 38°53′9.6″N 77°2′49.2″W
- Area: 394.9 acres (159.8 ha)
- Built: 1881-1912
- Part of: East and West Potomac Parks Historic District (ID73000217)
- Designated CP: November 30, 1973

West Potomac Park is a U.S. national park in Washington, D.C., adjacent to the National Mall. It includes the parkland that extends south of the Lincoln Memorial Reflecting Pool, from the Lincoln Memorial to the grounds of the Washington Monument. The park is the site of several national landmarks including the Korean War Veterans Memorial, Jefferson Memorial, Franklin Delano Roosevelt Memorial, George Mason Memorial, and the Martin Luther King Jr. Memorial.

The park includes the surrounding land on the shore of the Tidal Basin, an artificial inlet of the Potomac River which was created in the 19th century, an inlet that links the Potomac with the northern end of the Washington Channel.

West Potomac Park is administered by National Mall and Memorial Parks, an administrative unit of the National Park Service's National Capital Parks.

== Creation ==
Almost none of the National Mall west of the Washington Monument grounds and below Constitution Avenue NW existed prior to 1882. After terrible flooding inundated much of downtown Washington, D.C., in 1881, Congress ordered the Army Corps of Engineers to dredge a deep channel in the Potomac and use the material to fill in the Potomac (creating the current banks of the river) and raise much of the land near the White House and along Pennsylvania Avenue NW by nearly 6 feet (1.8 m). In the process, the nearby Babcock Lakes, a series of small ponds, were filled in. This reclaimed land — which included West Potomac Park, East Potomac Park, the Tidal Basin — was largely complete by 1890, and designated Potomac Park by Congress in 1897. Congress first appropriated money for the beautification of the reclaimed land in 1902, which led to the planting of sod, bushes, and trees along with the installation of sidewalks, bridle paths, and utilities.

== Cherry trees ==
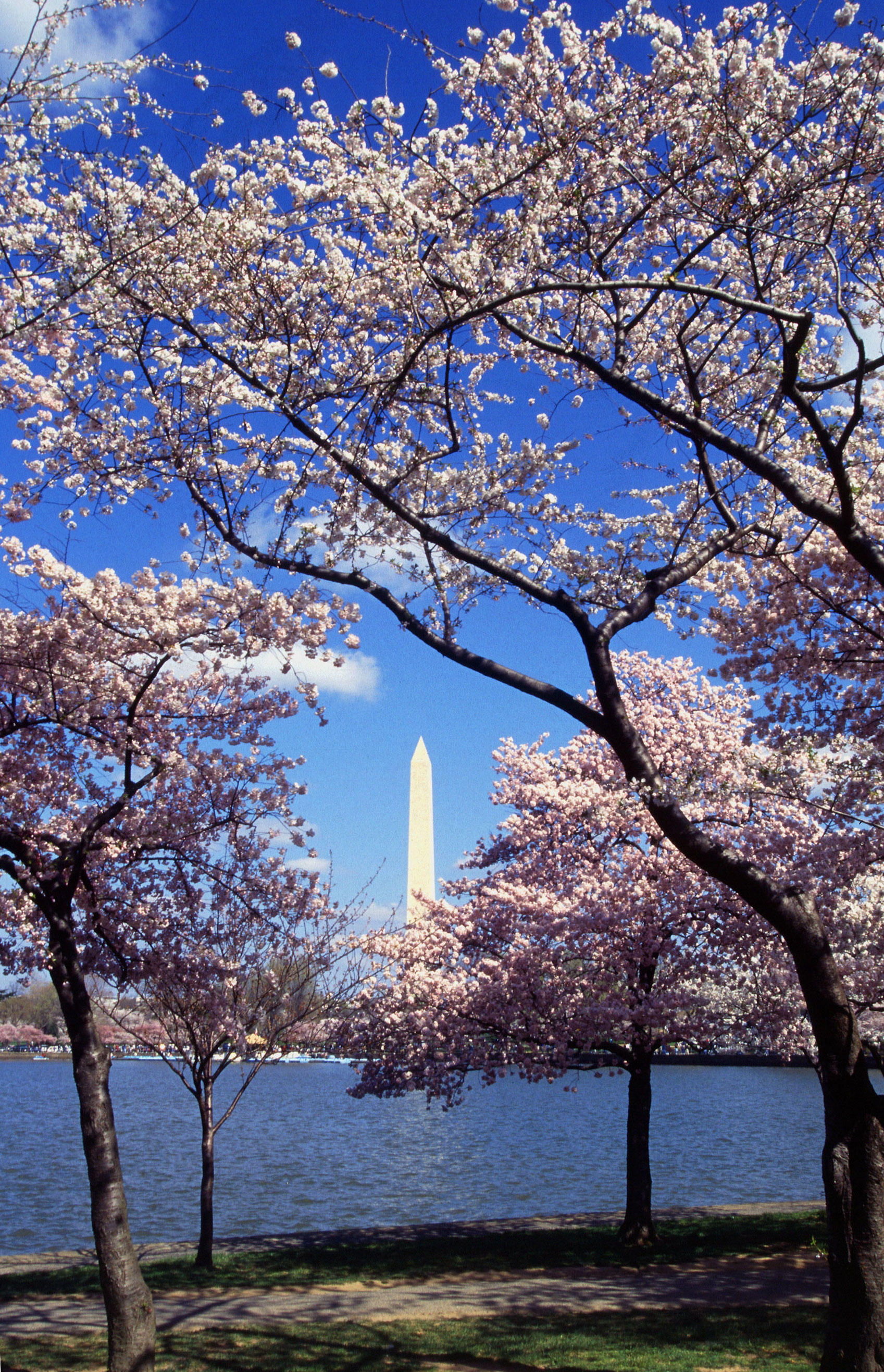
West Potomac Park seen from across the Tidal Basin with cherry trees in bloom

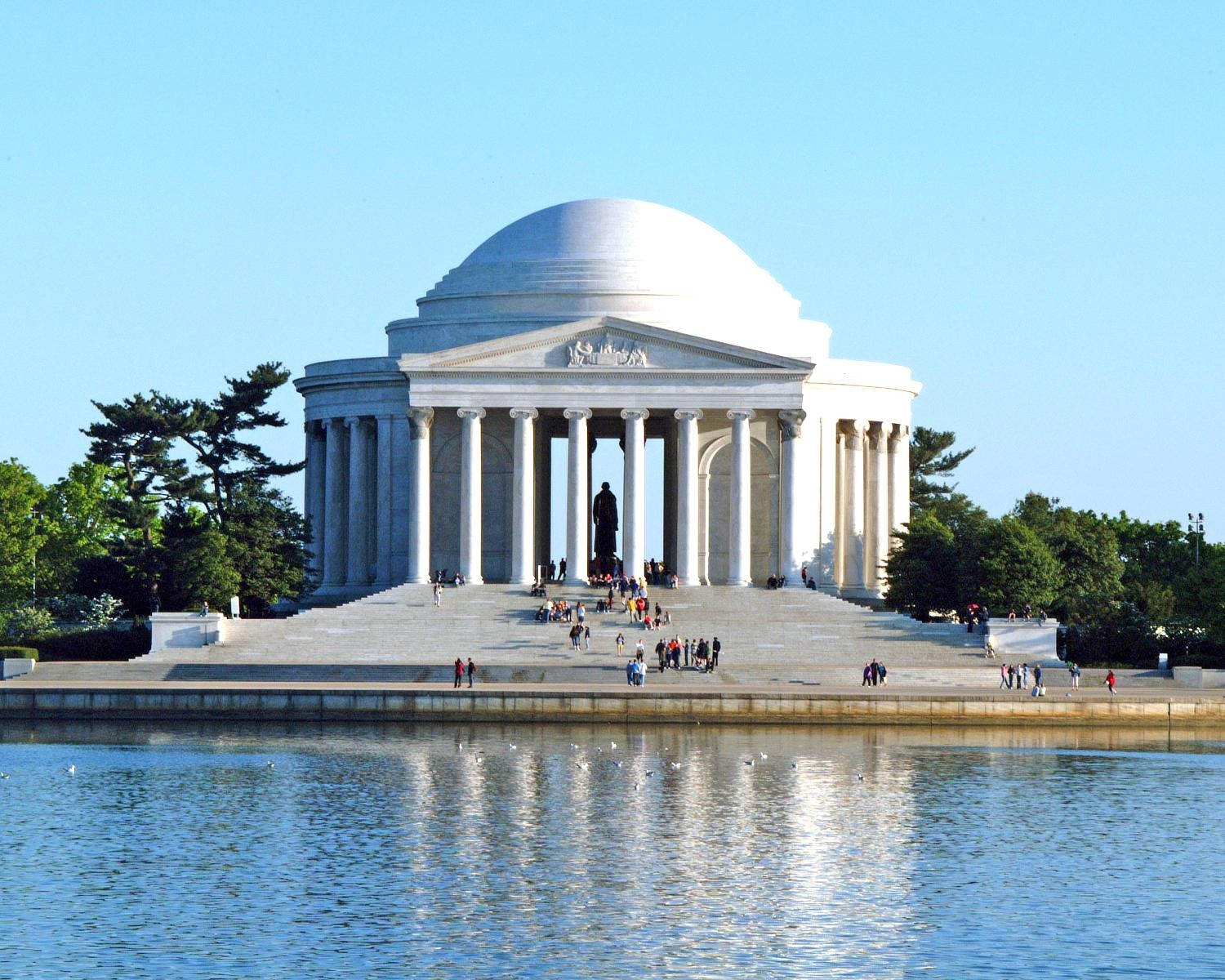
The Jefferson Memorial in West Potomac Park

The famous sakura Japanese cherry trees of Washington, D.C., line the Tidal Basin and are the main attraction at the National Cherry Blossom Festival in early spring, when the cherry blossoms bloom. Eliza Ruhamah Scidmore, upon returning to Washington, D.C., from a visit to Japan, initiated the idea of cherry trees in Washington, D.C., She approached the Superintendent of Public Building and Grounds, then Colonel Spencer Cosby, about the idea in 1885. Her idea was rejected; over the next 24 years, Scidmore approached every new superintendent, but the idea was never authorized.

In 1906, Dr. David Fairchild, a botanist who worked for the U.S. Department of Agriculture, imported 75 flowering cherry trees and 25 single-flowered weeping types from the Yokohama Nursery Company in Japan. Fairchild planted these trees on a hillside on his own property in Chevy Chase, Maryland, testing their hardiness in the Washington area. In 1907, pleased with the success of the trees, Fairchild and his wife began to promote Japanese flowering cherry trees as the ideal type of tree to plant along avenues in the Washington area. Friends of family also became interested, and on September 26, arrangements were completed with the Chevy Chase Land Company to order 300 Oriental cherry trees for the Chevy Chase area.

In 1908, Fairchild gave cherry saplings to boys from each school in the District to plant in schoolyards on Arbor Day. In closing his Arbor Day speech, Fairchild expressed a vision that the "Speedway" (the present day corridor of Independence Avenue in West Potomac Park) be transformed into a Field of Cherries. In attendance was Eliza Scidmore, who afterwards he referred to as a great authority on Japan. In 1909, Scidmore decided to try to raise the money required to purchase the cherry trees and then donate the trees to the city. Scidmore sent a note outlining her new plan to the new First Lady, Helen Herron Taft—the wife of President William Howard Taft— who had once lived in Japan and was familiar with the beauty of the flowering cherry trees. Two days later, the First Lady responded:

The White House, Washington
April 7, 1909
Thank you very much for your suggestion about the cherry trees. I have taken the matter up and am promised the trees, but I thought perhaps it would be best to make an avenue of them, extending down to the turn in the road, as the other part (beyond the railroad bridge Ed.) is still too rough to do any planting. Of course, they could not reflect in the water, but the effect would be very lovely of the long avenue. Let me know what you think about this.
Sincerely yours,
Helen H. Taft

On April 8, the day after Taft's letter, Dr. Jōkichi Takamine, the Japanese chemist famous as the discoverer of adrenaline and takadiastase, was in Washington, D.C., with Midzuno, the Japanese consul in New York City. When told Washington was to have Japanese cherry trees planted along the Speedway, he asked whether the First Lady would accept a donation of an additional 2,000 trees. Midzuno thought it was a fine idea and suggested the trees be given in the name of Tokyo, the capital of Japan. Takamine and Midzuno met with the Helen Taft, who accepted the offer.

On April 13, five days after the First Lady's request, the Superintendent of Public Building and Grounds ordered the purchase of 90 cherry trees (Prunus serrulata) of the Fugenzo variety from Hoopes Brothers and Thomas Company in West Chester, Pennsylvania. The trees were planted along the Potomac River from the present site of the Lincoln Memorial south toward East Potomac Park. After planting, it was discovered that the trees were not correctly named, and were not of the Fugenzo variety, but instead of the Shirofugen cultivar (cultivated variety). These trees have since disappeared.

Four months later, on August 30, the Japanese embassy informed the U.S. Department of State that Tokyo intended to donate 2,000 cherry trees to the United States to be planted along the Potomac River. On December 10, the trees arrived in Seattle, and on January 6, 1910 arrived in the capital. However, an inspection team for the Department of Agriculture discovered to everyone's dismay that the trees were infested with insects, roundworms, and plant diseases. To protect American growers, the department concluded that the trees must be destroyed. On January 28, Taft gave permission to destroy the trees, and they were burned. This diplomatic setback resulted in letters from Secretary of State and the representatives to the Japanese ambassador, expressing deep regret of all concerned. Dr. Takamine, meeting the bad news with goodwill, again donated the costs for the trees in 1912, whose number he now increased to 3,020. The seeds for these trees were taken in December 1910 from the famous collection on the bank of the Arakawa River in Adachi Ward, a suburb of Tokyo, and grafted on specially selected understock produced in Itami City in Hyōgo Prefecture.

The National Park Service cut 158 of the nearly 3,700 trees in 2024 to rebuild a seawall around the Tidal Basin to strengthen it to withstand sea level rise and more extreme rain events.

== Recreation ==
The West Potomac Rugby Football Club's match and practice pitch is located in the park.

== Map ==
Interactive Map

Landmarks: 1 - Lincoln Memorial 2 - Lincoln Memorial Reflecting Pool 3 - Korean War Veterans Memorial 4 - Martin Luther King Jr. Memorial 5 - Franklin Delano Roosevelt Memorial 6 - Jefferson Memorial 7 - World War II Memorial 8 - Washington Monument (not part of West Potomac Park)

Also in the park are the District of Columbia War Memorial, George Mason Memorial, John Paul Jones Memorial, John Ericsson Memorial, The Arts of War and The Arts of Peace sculptures, the Japanese Pagoda and Lantern statues, the First Air Mail Marker, and the Cuban Friendship Urn.

On June 24, 2026, at a rally in the National Mall to kick off the Great American State Fair, Donald Trump announced the National Garden of American Heroes will be built in the park.

== See also ==
- East Potomac Park

== Bibliography ==
- Bednar, Michael J. L'Enfant's Legacy: Public Open Spaces in Washington, D.C. Baltimore, Md.: Johns Hopkins University Press, 2006.
- Gutheim, Frederick A. and Lee, Antoinette J. Worthy of the Nation: Washington, D.C., From L'Enfant to the National Capital Planning Commission. Baltimore, Md.: Johns Hopkins University Press, 2006.
- Report of the Chief of Engineers. War Department Annual Reports, 1917. Vol. 2. Washington, D.C.: Government Printing Office, 1918.
- Tindall, William. Standard History of the City of Washington From a Study of the Original Sources. Knoxville, Tenn.: H.W. Crew & Co., 1914.
