= William Stiles Bennet =

American politician (1870–1962)

William S. Bennet
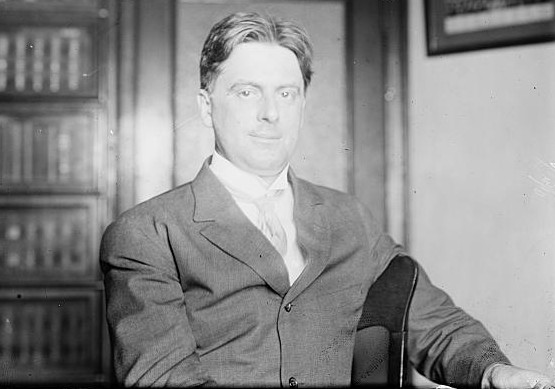
- Bennet in 1910

Member of the U.S. House of Representatives from New York
- In office March 4, 1905 – March 3, 1911
- Preceded by: Francis E. Shober
- Succeeded by: Henry George Jr.
- Constituency: 17th district
- In office November 2, 1915 – March 3, 1917
- Preceded by: Joseph A. Goulden
- Succeeded by: Charles B. Ward
- Constituency: 23rd district

Member of the New York State Assembly from the 21st district
- In office January 1, 1901 – December 31, 1902
- Preceded by: Edward H. Fallows
- Succeeded by: Frederick E. Wood

Personal details
- Born: William Stiles Bennet; November 9, 1870 Port Jervis, New York, United States
- Died: December 1, 1962 (aged 92) Central Valley, New York
- Resting place: Laurel Grove Cemetery, Port Jervis, New York
- Party: Republican
- Spouse: Gertrude Witschief Bennet
- Education: Albany Law School
- Profession: Lawyer, politician

William Stiles Bennet (November 9, 1870 – December 1, 1962) was an American politician and a U.S. representative from New York, serving five terms in the early 20th century. He was the father of Augustus Witschief Bennet.

== Biography ==
Born in Port Jervis, New York, Bennet was the son of James and Alice Leonora (Stiles) Bennet and attended the common schools. He graduated from Port Jervis Academy, Port Jervis, New York, in 1889; and from Albany Law School, Albany, New York, in 1892. He married Gertrude Witschief, on June 30, 1896.

== Career ==
Bennet was a lawyer in private practice and an official reporter of the Orange County Board of Supervisors from 1892 to 1893. He was a member of the New York State Assembly (New York County, 21st District) in 1901 and 1902. He served as justice of the municipal court of New York City, 1903. He served as member of the United States Immigration Commission from 1907 to 1910 and was one of two (of fourteen) members that generally opposed the restriction of immigration. He served as delegate to the Republican National Convention in 1908 and 1916. Bennet also spoke out against the denial of civil rights to African Americans in southern states, noting that those states benefited from greater representation because of the size of their black population but prevented those black citizens from voting.

Elected as a Republican to the Fifty-ninth and to the two succeeding Congresses, Bennet served as U. S. Representative for the seventeenth district of New York from March 4, 1905, to March 3, 1911. An unsuccessful candidate for reelection to the Sixty-second Congress in 1910, he was elected to the Sixty-fourth Congress to fill the vacancy caused by the death of United States Representative Joseph A. Goulden of the twenty-seventh district of New York and served from November 2, 1915, to March 3, 1917. He was an unsuccessful candidate for reelection to the Sixty-fifth Congress in 1916.

Bennet was the official parliamentarian of the Republican National Convention at Chicago in 1916, United States delegate to the Seventeenth International Congress Against Alcoholism held at Copenhagen, 1923, as well as a business executive. An unsuccessful candidate for election to the Seventy-fifth Congress in 1936, he served as a delegate to the New York state constitutional convention in 1938. He was an unsuccessful candidate at a special election in 1944 to fill a vacancy in the Seventy-eighth Congress.

== Death ==
Bennet died in Falkirk Hospital, Central Valley, Orange County, New York, on December 1, 1962 (age 92 years, 22 days). He was cremated; his ashes are interred at Laurel Grove Cemetery, Port Jervis, New York.

== General Reference ==
- The William Stiles Bennet Papers, 1884-1959. M.E. Grenander Department of Special Collections and Archives, University Libraries, University at Albany, State University of New York (hereafter referred to as the William Stiles Bennet Papers).

New York State Assembly
| Preceded by Edward H. Fallows | New York State Assembly; New York County, 21st District; 1901–1902 | Succeeded by Frederick E. Wood |
U.S. House of Representatives
| Preceded by Francis E. Shober | Member of the U.S. House of Representatives from New York's 17th congressional district March 4, 1905 to March 3, 1911 | Succeeded by Henry George Jr. |
| Preceded by Joseph A. Goulden | Member of the U.S. House of Representatives from New York's 23rd congressional district November 2, 1915 to March 3, 1917 | Succeeded by Charles B. Ward |
