= New York State Route 218 =

State highway in Orange County, New York, US

New York State Route 218
- Map of Orange County in southeastern New York with NY 218 highlighted in red

Route information
- Maintained by NYSDOT
- Length: 10.81 mi (17.40 km)
- Existed: August 1941–present

Major junctions
- South end: US 9W / US 6 Truck in Highland Falls
- North end: US 9W near Cornwall-on-Hudson

Location
- Country: United States
- State: New York
- Counties: Orange

Highway system
- New York Highways; Interstate; US; State; Reference; Parkways
← NY 217	→ US 219

New York State Route 218 (NY 218) is a state highway located within Orange County, New York, in the United States. It loops off U.S. Route 9W to run closer to the Hudson River between Highland Falls and Cornwall-on-Hudson. North of Highland Falls, it is briefly concurrent with US 9W.

NY 218 sees much traffic despite its short length. Not only does it bring most of the United States Military Academy's traffic to Thayer Gate, its main entrance, it attracts many who drive it just for the sake of its most renowned portion: the cliffside drive alongside Storm King Mountain. In good weather during the summer months, many cars can be seen taking in the views of the river and the Hudson Highlands here (however, this section can be gated off and closed in times of high rockslide danger).

== Route description ==
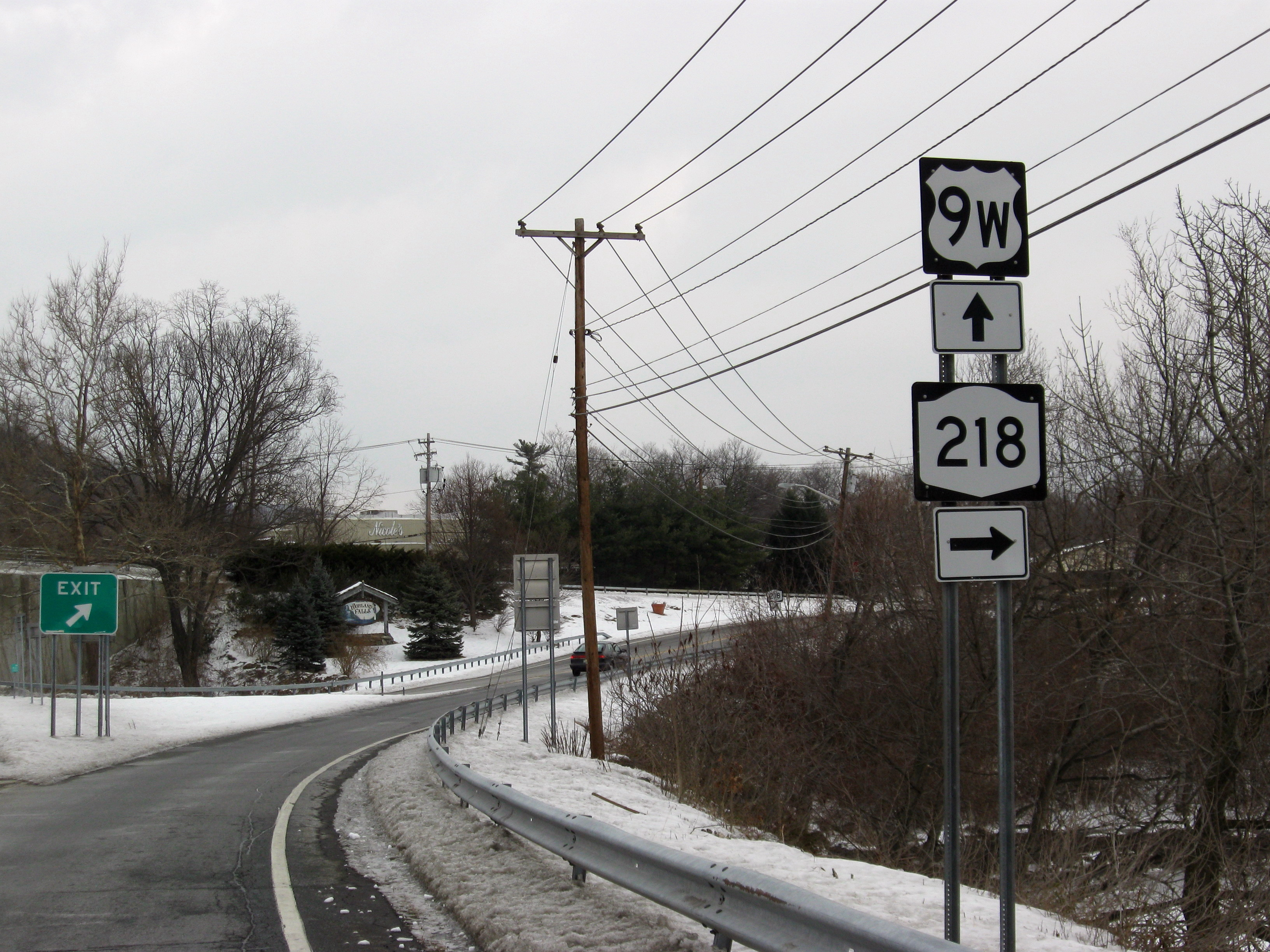
The interchange with US 9W that serves as the southern terminus of NY 218 in Highland Falls

NY 218 begins at a trumpet interchange with flyover ramps with US 9W in the village of Highland Falls near the former site of Fort Montgomery. NY 218 proceeds northeast through the village as a two-lane village street, turning northward at an intersection with Old State Road. NY 218 proceeds north, crossing a large residential section of Highland Falls bending northeast then north before intersecting with West Point Highway (unsigned NY 980W). A short distance to the north in Highland Falls, NY 218 bends west on an intersection with Mill Street and Mountain Avenue, where NY 218 turns west on Mountain Avenue, a two-lane commercial/residential street through Highland Falls. Passing west of Highland Falls Intermediate School, the route bends northward around a small section of the United States Military Academy at West Point.

NY 218 winds through Highland Falls, leaving the downtown section of the village, entering an interchange with US 9W and Stony Lonesome Road. Stony Lonesome Road connects US 9W and NY 218 to West Point's Stony Lonesome Gate, while NY 218 merges with US 9W northbound, forming a concurrency. Now in the town of Highlands, NY 218 and US 9W wind northwest as a four-lane expressway through the West Point Golf Course, where NY 218 forks off at an interchange that also doubles as the northern terminus of NY 293. Now on the right-of-way ceded from NY 293, NY 218 parallels US 9W as a two-lane surface road running along the northwestern side of the golf course. After the golf course, the route intersects with Washington Road. Washington Road connects NY 218 to West Point via Washington Gate, while NY 218 proceeds north through Highlands.

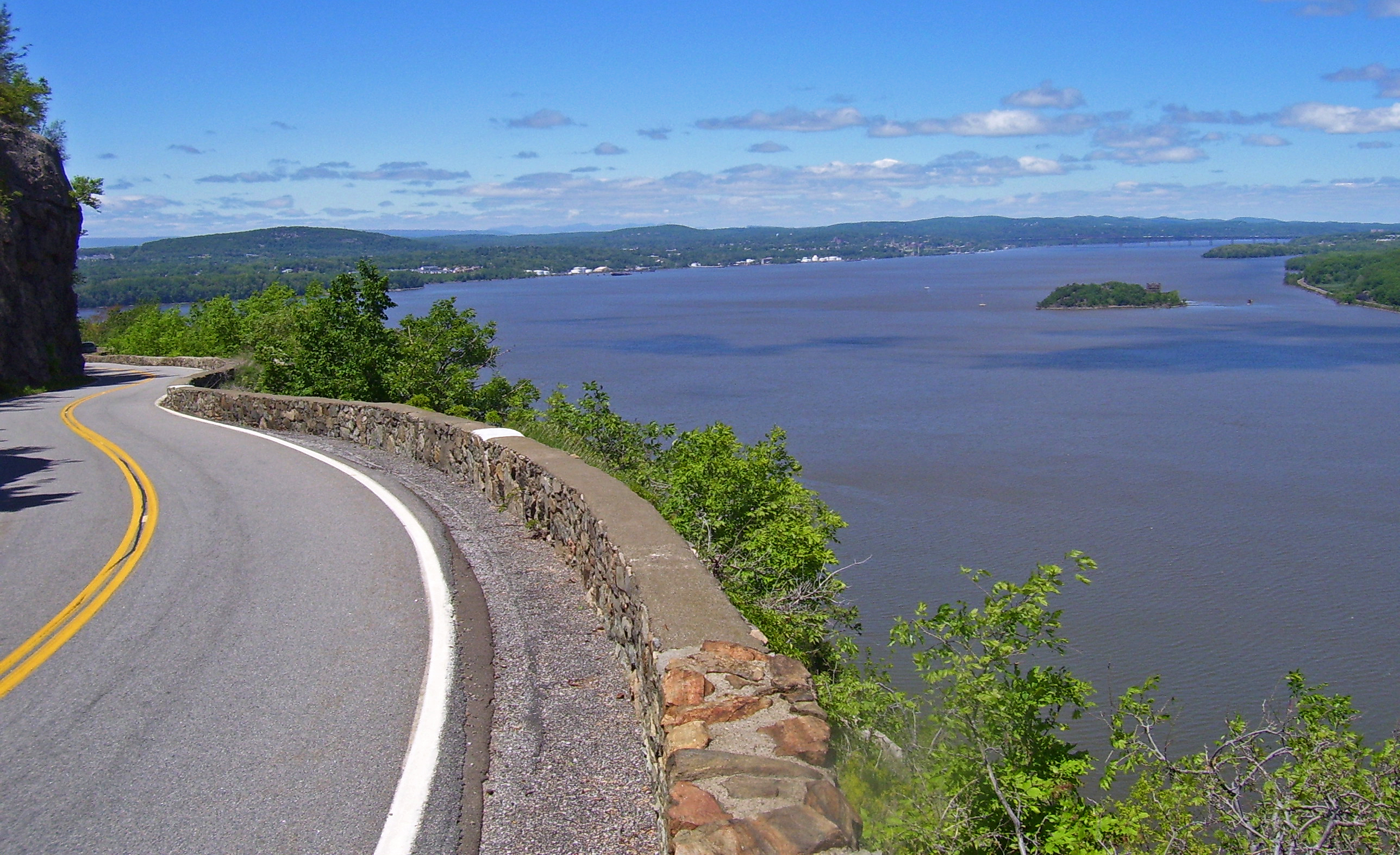
NY 218 overlooking the Hudson River on part of the Storm King Highway in Cornwall

NY 218 winds north and northwest along the border of West Point, crossing through a section of the military academy. As the route approaches the Hudson River, it bends northward as the Storm King Highway, paralleling the river and the CSX Transportation-owned River Subdivision (ex-West Shore Line). A short distance to the north, the route crosses a gate and enters Storm King State Park. Making a large bend around a rock base, NY 218 approaches the Hudson River, overlooking the river and railroad tracks below. The route winds northwest for several miles alongside the rock siding, crossing into the town of Cornwall, where the route turns west and away from the river. Crossing through a dense section of woods, the route makes several bends through Storm King State Park, re-approaching the river a short distance to the north.

NY 218 turns westward again in Cornwall, crossing into the village of Cornwall-on-Hudson. A short distance to the east, NY 218 crosses out of Storm King State Park and crosses gates that close the roadway. Now known as Bay View Avenue, NY 218 is a two-lane residential street through Cornwall-on-Hudson, proceeding west through the village. At Dock Hill Extension, NY 218 darts north and changes streets to Hudson Street, where it continues westward. Hudson Street is more commercial than Bay View Avenue and after entering the downtown section of Cornwall-on-Hudson, NY 218 darts westward on Hudson, while Idlewild Avenue continues northwest on the former right-of-way. The section of NY 218 west of Idlewild is residential before intersecting with Academy Avenue, where NY 218 turns off of Hudson Street.

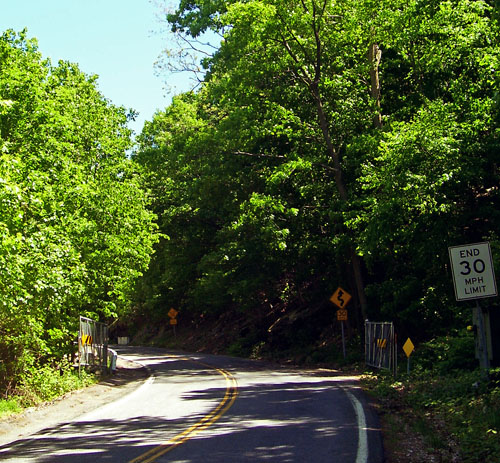
The northern Storm King Highway gates on NY 218 at the Cornwall-on-Hudson village line

NY 218 continues northwest through Cornwall-on-Hudson on Academy Avenue, remaining a two-lane residential street through the village. At the intersection with County Route 9 (CR 9; Main Street, formerly the northern terminus of NY 307), NY 218 proceeds northwest again, entering an interchange with US 9W. Now back in the town of Cornwall, NY 218 terminates at this interchange with US 9W.

== History ==
In 1908, the New York State Legislature created Route 3, an unsigned legislative route extending from the New Jersey state line in Rockland County to Albany by way of the Hudson River's west bank. The route mostly followed what is now U.S. Route 9W; however, from Highland Falls to Cornwall-on-Hudson, it used modern NY 218 instead. Much of legislative Route 3 became part of NY 10 when the first set of posted routes in New York were assigned in 1924 and part of US 9W when it was originally assigned in 1927.

In the early 1930s, plans were made by the state of New York to construct a new highway between the Bear Mountain Bridge and Cornwall-on-Hudson that would bypass both Cornwall-on-Hudson and Highland Falls and bypass the narrow Storm King Highway. On April 8, 1934, three people were killed by a rockslide on the Storm King Highway, expediting plans for the new highway, known as the Storm King Cut-off. In April 1935, the Storm King Cut-Off was given the designation of NY 257. It was constructed in stages from 1937 to 1941, with the final segment of the highway (from Angola Road north to Blooming Grove Turnpike north of Cornwall-on-Hudson) opening to traffic on May 31, 1941. US 9W was realigned to follow the cut-off while its old route via the Storm King Highway became NY 218 in August 1941.

During the forest fires on Storm King during the summer of 1999, NY 218 was closed for over a year, reopening in August 2000. The road was washed out in 2023 by the Northeastern United States flash flood of July.

== Major intersections ==
The entire route is in Orange County.

Location	mi	km	Destinations	Notes
Highland Falls	0.00	0.00	US 9W / US 6 Truck – New York, Newburgh	Interchange; southern terminus
Highland Falls	0.22	0.35	Old State Road (NY 980U south)	
Highland Falls	0.98	1.58	West Point Highway (NY 980W north) – West Point	
Town of Highlands	2.45	3.94	Southern end of limited-access section	
Town of Highlands	2.45	3.94	US 9W south / US 6 Truck east	Southern end of US 9W/US 6 Truck concurrency
Town of Highlands	3.21	5.17	US 9W north / NY 293 south / US 6 Truck west – Newburgh, Central Valley	Northern end of US 9W/US 6 Truck concurrency; northern terminus of NY 293
Town of Highlands	3.21	5.17	Northern end of limited-access section	
Town of Cornwall			CR 9 south (Main Street)	Former NY 307
Town of Cornwall	10.81	17.40	US 9W – Newburgh, Bear Mountain	Interchange; northern terminus; hamlet of Firthcliffe
1.000 mi = 1.609 km; 1.000 km = 0.621 mi: Concurrency terminus
