= Jōkichi =

- Gender: Male

Origin
- Origin: Japanese
- Meaning: Different meanings depending on the kanji used

Jōkichi, Jokichi or Joukichi (written: 譲吉 or 丈吉) is a masculine Japanese given name. Notable people with the name include:

- Jokichi Ikarashi (五十嵐 丈吉; 1902–2013), Japanese supercentenarian
- Jōkichi Takamine (高峰 譲吉; 1854–1922), Japanese chemist
- Jokichi Aishi (né Yudasei), a character in Yandere Simulator
