= Sutherland (disambiguation) =

Sutherland is an area in Highland, Scotland.

Sutherland may also refer to:

== Places ==
=== Australia ===
- Sutherland, New South Wales, a suburb of Sydney
- Sutherland, Victoria, a town
- Sutherland Shire, local government area in the Sydney region

=== Canada ===
- Sutherland, Saskatoon, a former town which was annexed by Saskatoon in 1956
- Saskatoon Sutherland, electoral district

=== Iceland ===
- Suðurland, one of the eight regions of the country

=== New Zealand ===
- Sutherland Falls, the highest falls in New Zealand

=== South Africa ===
- Sutherland, Northern Cape, hosts the country's astronomical observatory hub

=== United Kingdom ===
- Sutherland Avenue, a street in London, England

=== United States ===
- Sutherland, Iowa
- Sutherland, Missouri
- Sutherland, Nebraska
- Sutherland, Utah
- Sutherland, Virginia
- Sutherland, Wisconsin

== People ==
- Clan Sutherland, a Scottish clan
- Earl of Sutherland, in the Peerage of Scotland
- Duke of Sutherland, in the Peerage of the United Kingdom
- Sutherland (surname), includes a list of people with the surname

== Astronomy and spaceflight ==
- Site of the South African Astronomical Observatory
- Sutherland Astronomical Society, based in Sydney, Australia
- Sutherland spaceport

== See also ==
- Battle of Sutherland's Station
- HMS Sutherland, ships in the Royal Navy
- Pittsford Sutherland High School
- Sutherland House (disambiguation)
- Sutherland Secondary School
- Niles and Sutherland Report
