= Arthur S. Tompkins =

American politician and jurist

Arthur Sidney Tompkins
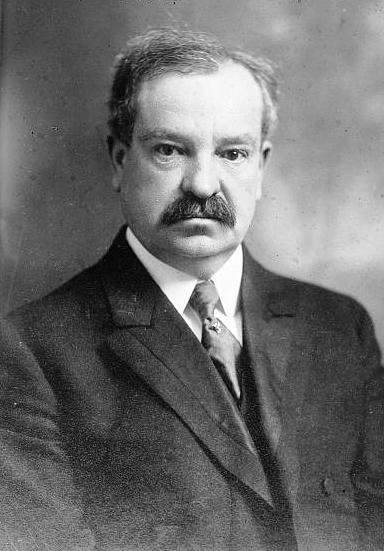

Grand Master of the Grand Lodge of New York of Freemasons
- In office 1922–1923
- Preceded by: Robert H. Robinson
- Succeeded by: William A. Rowan

Justice of the New York Supreme Court
- In office 1906, 1920, 1934

Member of the U.S. House of Representatives from New York's 17th district
- In office March 4, 1899 – March 3, 1903
- Preceded by: Benjamin B. Odell Jr.
- Succeeded by: Francis Emanuel Shober

Member of the New York State Assembly from Rockland County
- In office January 1, 1890 – December 31, 1890
- Preceded by: Frank P. Demarest
- Succeeded by: Frank P. Demarest

Personal details
- Born: August 26, 1865 Middleburgh, New York
- Died: January 20, 1938 (aged 72) Nyack, New York
- Party: Republican

Arthur Sidney Tompkins (August 26, 1865 – January 20, 1938) was a U.S. representative from New York, and a justice of the New York Supreme Court.

== Early life ==
Born in Middleburgh, New York, Tompkins moved with his parents to West Nyack, New York, in 1866. He attended the public schools of Clarkstown and Nyack until 1878. He studied law, was admitted to the bar in 1886 and commenced practice in Nyack, New York. He was police justice of Nyack, New York, from 1887 to 1889.

== Political career ==
Tompkins was elected chairman of the Rockland County Republican committee in 1888. He was a member of the New York State Assembly (Rockland Co.) in 1890. He was a delegate to all Republican State conventions from 1888 to 1906, and as delegate or alternate to all Republican National Conventions from 1888 to 1900. He was also county judge and surrogate of Rockland County 1893-1898.

Tompkins was elected as a Republican to the 56th and 57th United States Congresses, holding office from March 4, 1899, to March 3, 1903. Afterwards he resumed the practice of law in Nyack.

== Judicial career ==
Tompkins was elected justice of the Supreme Court of New York in 1906. He was reelected in 1920 and 1934. He was promoted to the Appellate Division of the Supreme Court of New York in January 1930 and served until his retirement in 1936. He died in Nyack, New York, January 20, 1938. He was interred in Oak Hill Cemetery.

== Freemasonry ==
Tompkins served as the Grand Master of the Grand Lodge of New York of Freemasons from 1922 to 1923.

== Sources ==
- United States Congress. "Arthur S. Tompkins (id: T000302)". Biographical Directory of the United States Congress.

New York State Assembly
Preceded by Frank P. Demarest	New York State Assembly; Rockland County; 1890	Succeeded by Frank P. Demarest
U.S. House of Representatives
Preceded by Benjamin B. Odell Jr.	Member of the U.S. House of Representatives from New York's 17th congressional district 1899-1903	Succeeded by Francis Emanuel Shober
