= Japanese Pagoda (Washington, D.C.) =

Statue in Washington, D.C

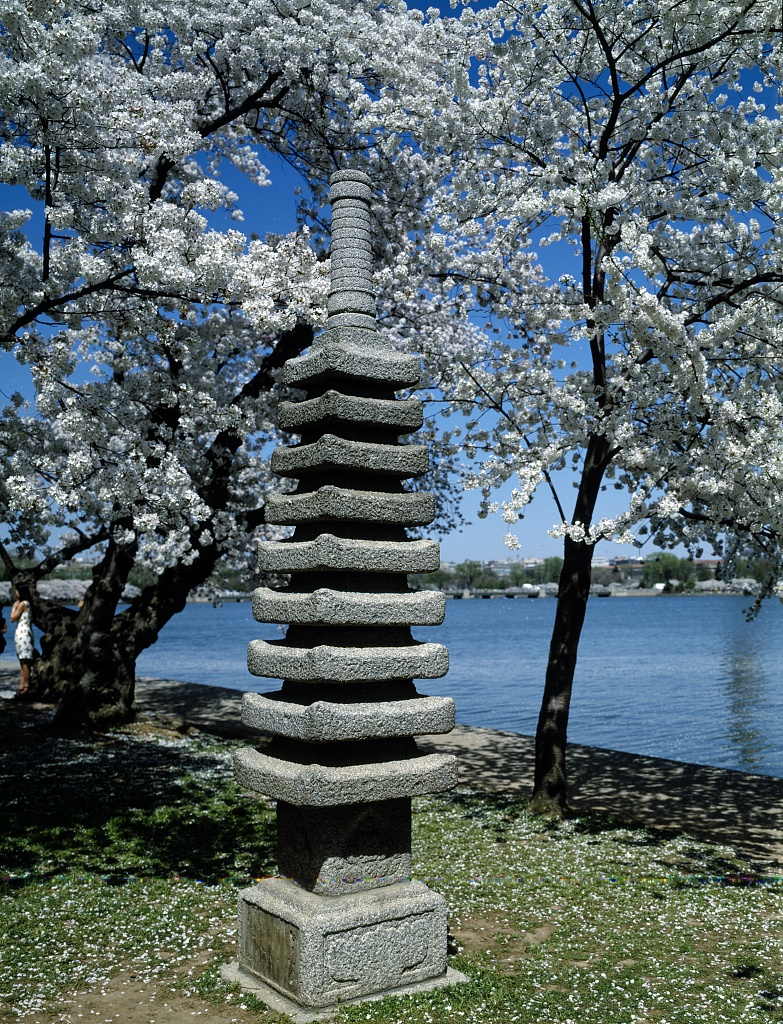
- Year: 17th century
- Type: Granite
- Dimensions: 240 cm × 120 cm (96 in × 48 in)
- Location: Washington, D.C.; 38.882778°N 77.041667°W
- Owner: National Park Service

The Japanese Pagoda is a stone statue in West Potomac Park, Washington, D.C. It is located next to the Tidal Basin, and the Franklin Delano Roosevelt Memorial.

The statue was a gift by the mayor of Yokohama, Japan in 1957. It was dedicated on April 18, 1958. The gift was presented as a gesture of friendship to mark the signing of the Treaty of Kanagawa (also known as the Convention of Yokohama) on March 31, 1854. The treaty was negotiated under pressure from U.S. Commodore Matthew Perry, who had threatened naval action if Japan refused.

== See also ==
- Japanese Lantern (Washington, D.C.)
- List of public art in Washington, D.C., Ward 2
