= John Christopher Burch =

American politician (1827-1881)

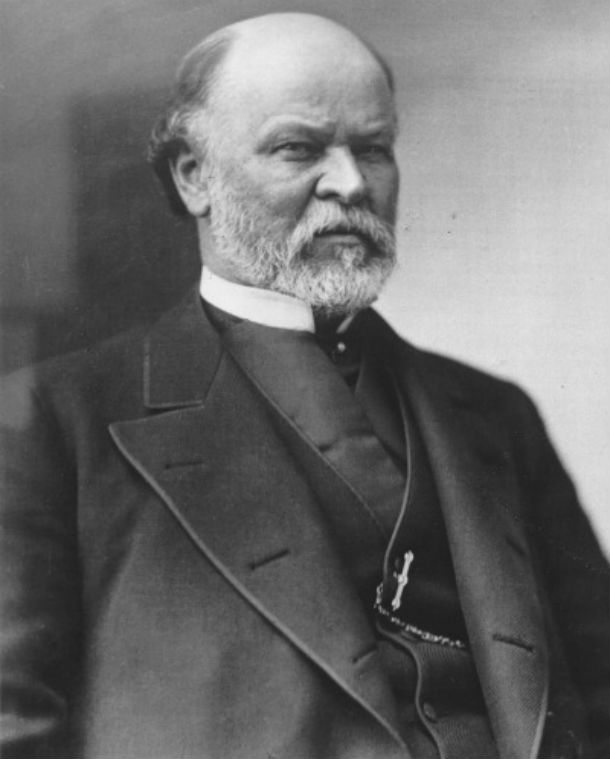

7th secretary of the United States Senate
- In office March 24, 1879 – July 28, 1881
- Preceded by: George Congdon Gorham
- Succeeded by: Francis Edwin Shober

Personal details
- Born: October 27, 1827 Jefferson County, Georgia, US
- Died: July 28, 1881 (aged 53) Washington, D.C., US
- Education: Yale College

John Christopher Burch (October 27, 1827 – July 28, 1881) was a lawyer from Tennessee who had served as the seventh secretary of the United States Senate from 1879 until his death in 1881.

== Early life and education ==
Burch, son of Morton N. and Mary (Ballard) Burch, was born in Jefferson County, Georgia, October 27, 1827.

He graduated from Yale College in 1847. He studied law with Gov. Charles McDonald of Georgia and practiced for three years in his native State, removing to Chattanooga, Tenn., in 1852.

== Career ==
In 1855 and 1856 he was elected to the lower house of the Tennessee State Legislature, and in 1857 and 1858 to a seat in the Tennessee State Senate, bringing such a reputation for ability and fairness that he was made the presiding officer, notwithstanding his youth and little experience.

In 1859 he moved to Nashville, undertaking besides the practice of his profession the editorship of the Nashville Union and American, the old Democratic newspaper of the State. During the stormy canvass of 1860, he took the Southern side with fervor in his editorial position, and from 1861 to 1865 served faithfully in the Confederate Army, at first on the staff of Gen. Pillow, and subsequently as aide to Gen. Forrest and Gen. Withers.

At the close of the American Civil War, he resumed the practice of law in Nashville, and was attaining high rank at the bar, when in 1869 he was tempted to purchase a controlling influence in the paper which he had formerly edited, and to assume the duties of managing editor. He was thus occupied for the remaining years.

In 1873, he was appointed as Comptroller of the State; there were allegations that Burch had purchased this office, but an investigation officially cleared him.

In March 1879, he was elected Secretary of the US Senate, under the Democratic reorganization. In this situation he won the esteem of Senators of all parties, and at his death left an excellent record for probity and efficiency.

== Personal life and death ==
He was married in 1852 to Lucy Newell, who survived him with four sons and two daughters.

He died in Washington, July 28, 1881, in his 54th year, from heart disease, supervening on an existing complication of diseases of the liver and kidneys.

This article incorporates public domain material from the 1882 Yale Obituary Record.
