= James Francis Shober =

American physician (1853–1889)

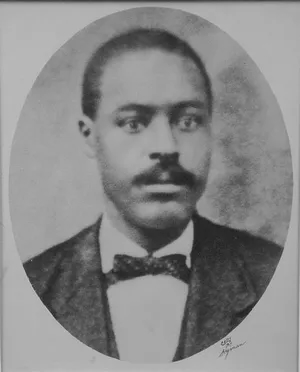
- Born: August 23, 1853; Salem, North Carolina, U.S.
- Died: January 6, 1889 (aged 35); Wilmington, North Carolina
- Education: Lincoln University (AB); Howard University College of Medicine (MD)
- Occupation: Physician
- Known for: First professionally trained Black physician in North Carolina
- Father: Francis Edwin Shober

James Francis Shober (August 23, 1853 – January 6, 1889) was an American medical doctor and the first African-American medical doctor with a medical degree known to have practiced in North Carolina. He was the natural son of U.S. Congressman Francis Edwin Shober.

== Life and career ==
Shober was born in Salem, North Carolina, on August 23, 1853. His parents were Betsy Ann Waugh, an 18-year-old enslaved woman, and Francis Edwin Shober, a 22-year-old white lawyer who served in the United States House of Representatives 15 years later. Betsy soon married David Shober, enslaved by a relative of Francis Edwin Shober. She died in 1859, and her son went to live with his grandmother on the Waugh plantation. He probably received his early education from the Moravian community of Salem.

James Francis Shober received his bachelor of arts (AB) degree from Lincoln University in Pennsylvania in 1875 and his medical degree (MD) from Howard University College of Medicine in 1878. White relatives, perhaps his natural father, subsidized his studies. Shober set up a medical practice in Wilmington, then the largest town in North Carolina, becoming the first professionally trained Black physician in the state and the only one in Wilmington. He married schoolteacher Anna Maria Taylor on June 28, 1881. The couple had two daughters, Mary Louise and Emily Lillian, both of whom went on to graduate from Fisk University. Shober also served as an elder in the Presbyterian church and participated in the Old North State Medical Society for African American doctors.

Shober died on January 6, 1889, at the age of 35. He was buried in Pine Forest Cemetery in Wilmington. In 1982, the State of North Carolina installed a historical marker dedicated to Shober's memory near his Wilmington home and office.
