= Nathaniel Boyden =

American judge

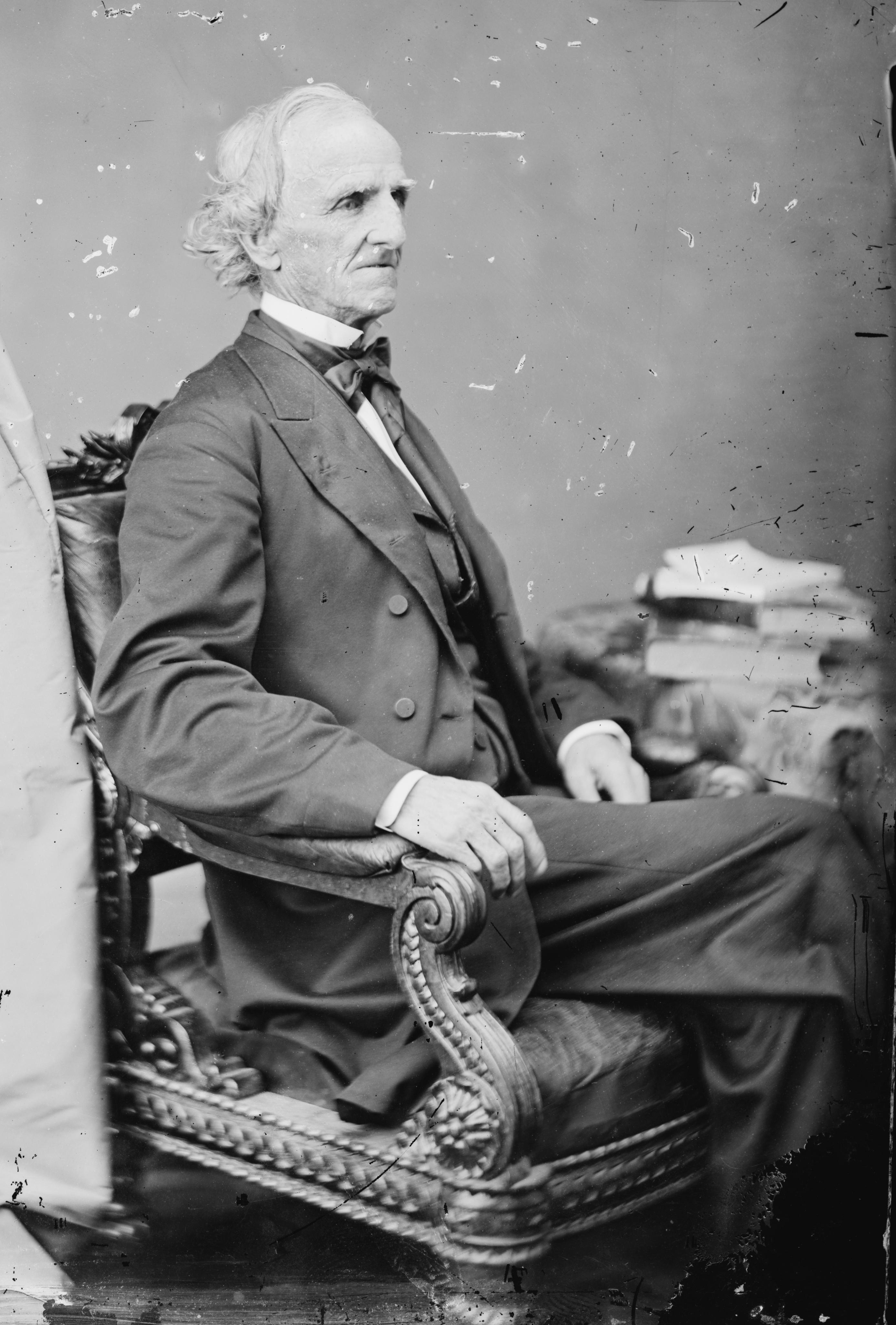

Member of the U.S. House of Representatives from North Carolina's 6th district
- In office July 13, 1868 – March 4, 1869
- Preceded by: James Madison Leach
- Succeeded by: Francis Edwin Shober

Member of the U.S. House of Representatives from North Carolina's 2nd district
- In office March 4, 1847 – March 4, 1849
- Preceded by: Daniel Moreau Barringer
- Succeeded by: Joseph Pearson Caldwell

Personal details
- Born: August 16, 1796 Conway, Massachusetts
- Died: November 20, 1873 (aged 77) Salisbury, North Carolina

Nathaniel Boyden (August 16, 1796 – November 20, 1873) was a U.S. Congressman from North Carolina between 1847 and 1849 and later between 1868 and 1869.

== Biography ==
Born in Conway, Massachusetts in 1796, Boyden attended the common schools and then served in the War of 1812. He graduated from Union College in Schenectady, New York, in 1821 and moved to Stokes County, North Carolina in 1822.

After teaching school for several years in North Carolina, Boyden studied law and was admitted to the bar and practiced. In 1838 and 1840, he was elected to terms in the North Carolina House of Commons. In 1842, Boyden moved to Salisbury, North Carolina and continued to practice law. In 1844 he was elected to the North Carolina Senate, and in 1846, voted to a single term in the 30th United States Congress (March 4, 1847 – March 3, 1849) as a Whig.

Declining to stand for re-election in 1848, Boyden returned to the practice of law. After the American Civil War, he was a delegate to the 1865 North Carolina Constitutional Convention, and, upon the readmission to North Carolina to the union, he was elected as a Conservative (as some North Carolina members of the Democratic Party were calling themselves) to the 40th United States Congress and served from July 13, 1868 to March 3, 1869. Boyden was the sole non-Republican to vote in favor of the 15th Amendment, granting voting rights regardless of race.

He unsuccessfully contested the election of Francis Edwin Shober to the 41st United States Congress, and afterwards resumed the practice of law until elected associate justice of the North Carolina Supreme Court in 1872. He served in that post until his death in Salisbury, on November 20, 1873; he is buried in the Lutheran Cemetery in Salisbury.

He was married to Jane Caroline Henderson (1805-1884), daughter of Congressman and North Carolina politician Archibald Henderson (1768-1822).

U.S. House of Representatives
| Preceded by Daniel Moreau Barringer | Member of the U.S. House of Representatives from North Carolina's 2nd congressional district 1847–1849 | Succeeded by Joseph Pearson Caldwell |
| Preceded by James Madison Leach | Member of the U.S. House of Representatives from North Carolina's 6th congressional district 1868–1869 | Succeeded by Francis Edwin Shober |
