= New York State Route 293 =

State highway in Orange County, New York, US

New York State Route 293
- Map of the West Point area with NY 293 highlighted in red

Route information
- Maintained by NYSDOT
- Length: 6.82 mi (10.98 km)
- Existed: c. 1934–present

Major junctions
- South end: US 6 in Woodbury
- North end: US 9W / NY 218 / US 6 Truck in Highlands

Location
- Country: United States
- State: New York
- Counties: Orange

Highway system
- New York Highways; Interstate; US; State; Reference; Parkways
← NY 292	→ NY 294

New York State Route 293 (NY 293) is a 6.82-mile (10.98 km) state highway located entirely within eastern Orange County, New York, in the United States. The highway starts at U.S. Route 6 (US 6, known as the Long Mountain Parkway) in Woodbury, and heads to the northeast, ending at an intersection with US 9W and NY 218 in the community of Highlands. It does not pass through any notable populated areas as most of the land around it is protected either as state parkland or US military reservation. However, it receives much traffic as the major route between the United States Military Academy at West Point and the New York State Thruway (Interstate 87 or I-87).

What is now NY 293 was originally designated as part of NY 37 in the mid-1920s. All of NY 37 became part of a realigned US 6 in 1928. US 6 was rerouted again c. 1934 to bypass West Point to the south. Its former routing through the academy grounds became NY 293.

== Route description ==
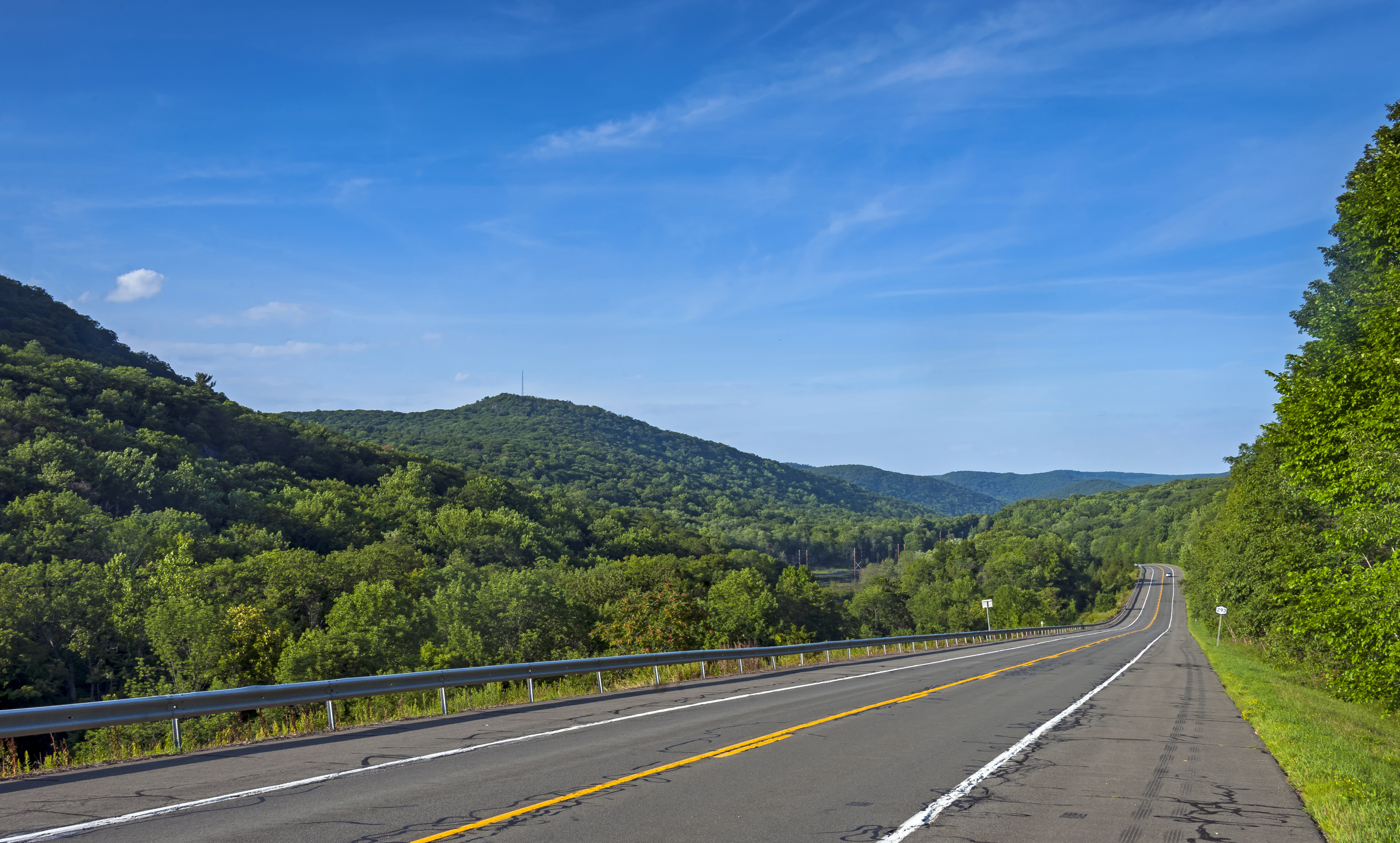
View north along NY 293 in Highlands, shortly beyond its southern terminus at US 6

NY 293 begins at a junction with US 6 in Woodbury less than 2 miles (3.2 km) east of the Thruway, in Harriman State Park. From there it travels in a roughly east-northeast direction between the Harriman properties and the vast USMA reservation, most of which is only selectively open to the public. NY 293's next major junction also serves as its northern terminus, at US 9W in Highlands. NY 218 ends its concurrency with US 9W there and takes over the roadway that continues east beyond the underpass. West Point's Washington Gate is a short distance past the intersection.

NY 293 is concurrent with US 6 Truck for its entire route.

The Long Path hiking trail follows in the woods closely alongside NY 293 near its southern terminus. Since truck traffic cannot use US 6, truck drivers may use NY 293 to reach US 9W.

== History ==
What is now NY 293 was originally designated as part of NY 37, an east–west highway extending from Monroe to the Connecticut state line near Brewster over most of modern US 6, in the mid-1920's. In 1927, the first route log of the U.S. Highway System published by AASHO placed US 6 on what is now US 209 from Port Jervis to Kingston within New York. At the time, the US 6 designation ended in Kingston and resumed at the Connecticut state line in Danbury. The gap in the designation was eliminated in 1928 when US 6 was realigned east of Port Jervis to follow most of its modern alignment; however, from Woodbury to the Bear Mountain Bridge, US 6 followed what had been NY 37 from Central Valley to Highlands and overlapped with US 9W south from Highlands to the bridge. US 6 was realigned c. 1934 to bypass West Point to the south while its former routing through the academy grounds was re-designated as NY 293.

== Major intersections ==
The entire route is in Orange County.

Location	mi	km	Destinations	Notes
Woodbury	0.00	0.00	US 6 (Long Mountain Parkway) – Chester, Central Valley, Peekskill US 6 Truck begins	Interchange; southern terminus; western terminus of US 6 Truck
Highlands	6.82	10.98	US 9W / NY 218 / US 6 Truck east – Newburgh, New York City, Highland Falls	Interchange; northern terminus; northern end of US 6 Truck concurrency
1.000 mi = 1.609 km; 1.000 km = 0.621 mi: Concurrency terminus
