= Japanese Lantern (Washington, D.C.) =

Artwork

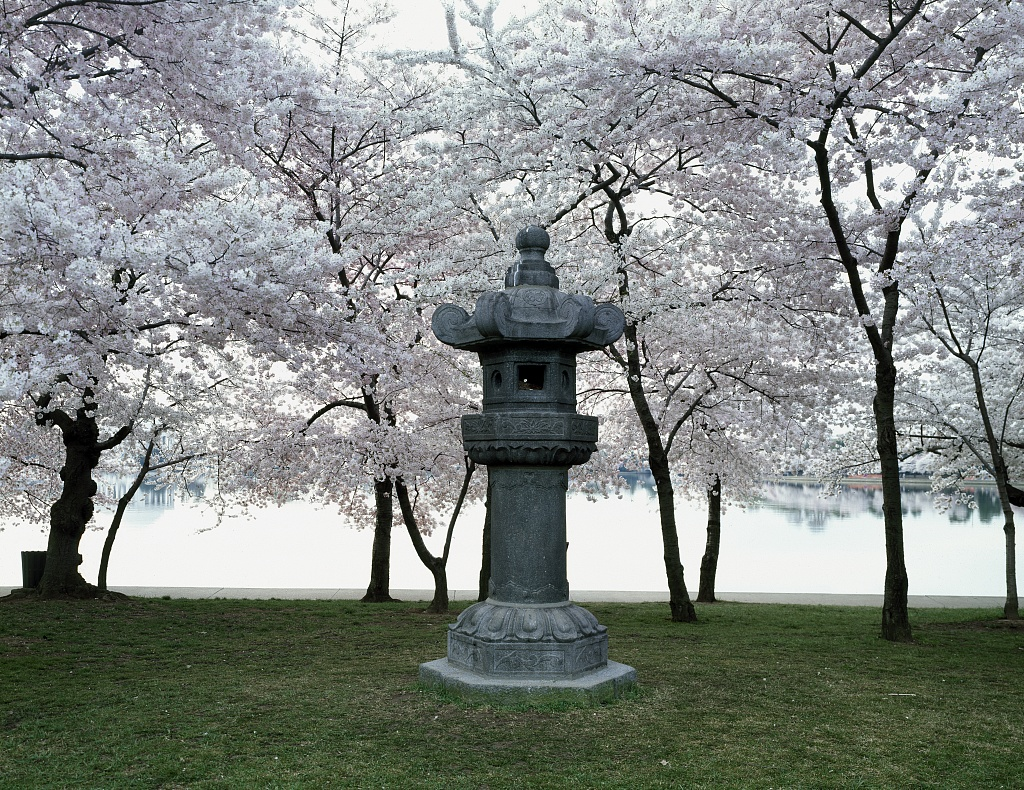
- Year: 1651
- Type: Granite
- Dimensions: 120 cm × 24 cm (47 in × 9.4 in)
- Location: Washington, D.C.; 38.886667°N 77.041389°W
- Owner: National Park Service

The Japanese Lantern is a stone lantern in West Potomac Park, Washington, D.C. It is located next to the Tidal Basin, among the cherry trees first planted in 1912. It is lighted during the annual National Cherry Blossom Festival.

A pair of lanterns were created in 1651, to mark the death of Tokugawa Iemitsu. The lantern was formerly located in Ueno Park, where its twin remains.

The lantern was given by the governor of Tokyo to the people of the United States and was dedicated on March 30, 1954.

== See also ==
- Japanese Pagoda (Washington, D.C.)
- List of public art in Washington, D.C., Ward 2
