= Henry George Jr. =

American politician

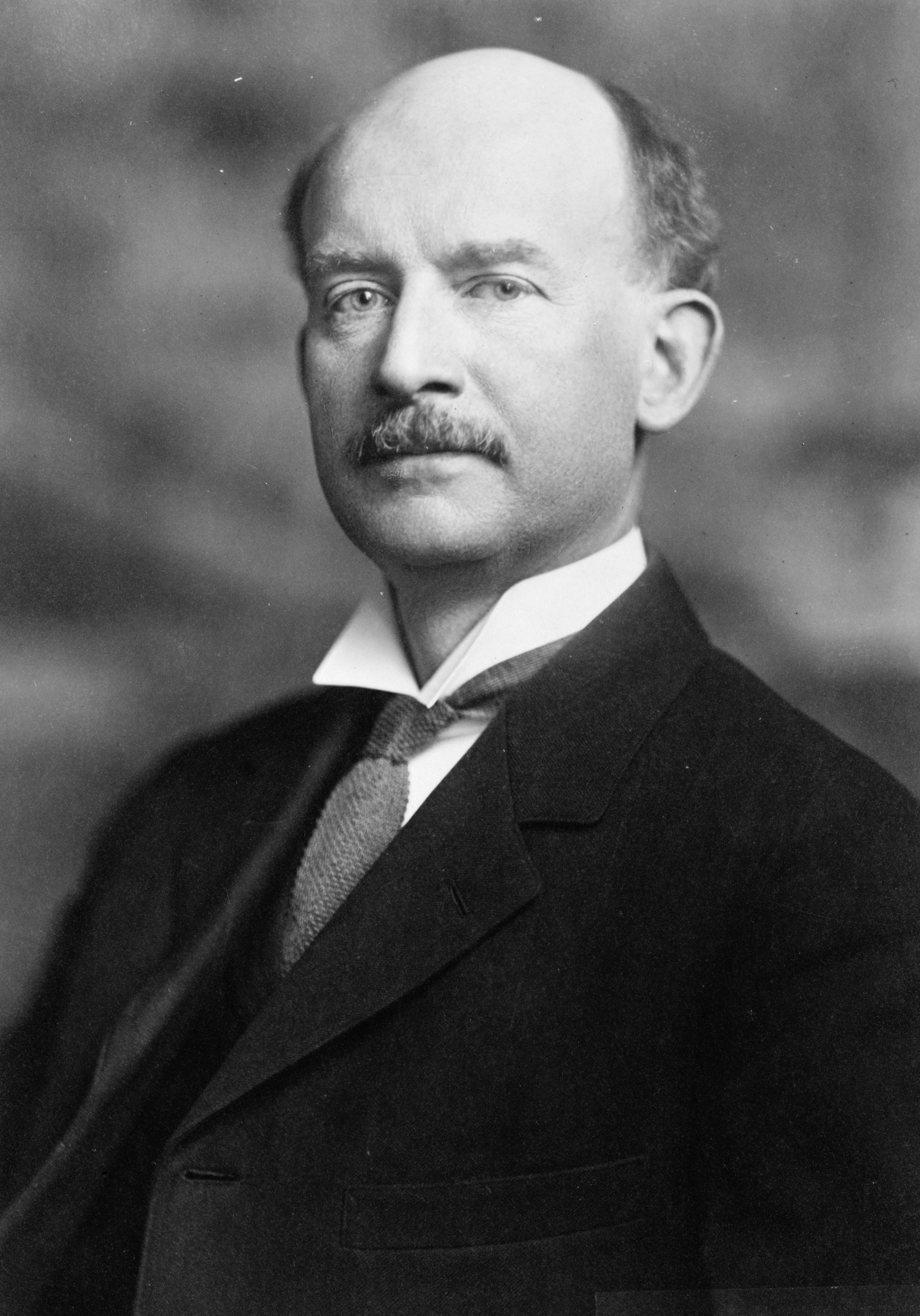
- Portrait of George, c. 1912

Member of the U.S. House of Representatives from New York
- In office March 4, 1911 – March 4, 1915
- Preceded by: William S. Bennet
- Succeeded by: G. Murray Hulbert
- Constituency: 17th district (1911–1913); 21st district (1913–1915)

Personal details
- Born: November 3, 1862 Sacramento, California, U.S.
- Died: November 14, 1916 (aged 54) Washington, D.C., U.S.
- Resting place: Green-Wood Cemetery
- Party: Democratic
- Spouse: Marie Morelle Hitch (m. 1897)
- Parent: Henry George (father)

Henry George Jr. (November 3, 1862 – November 14, 1916) was an American newspaperman who served two terms as a United States representative from New York from 1911 to 1915.

He was the son of the American political economist Henry George (1839–1897).

== Biography ==
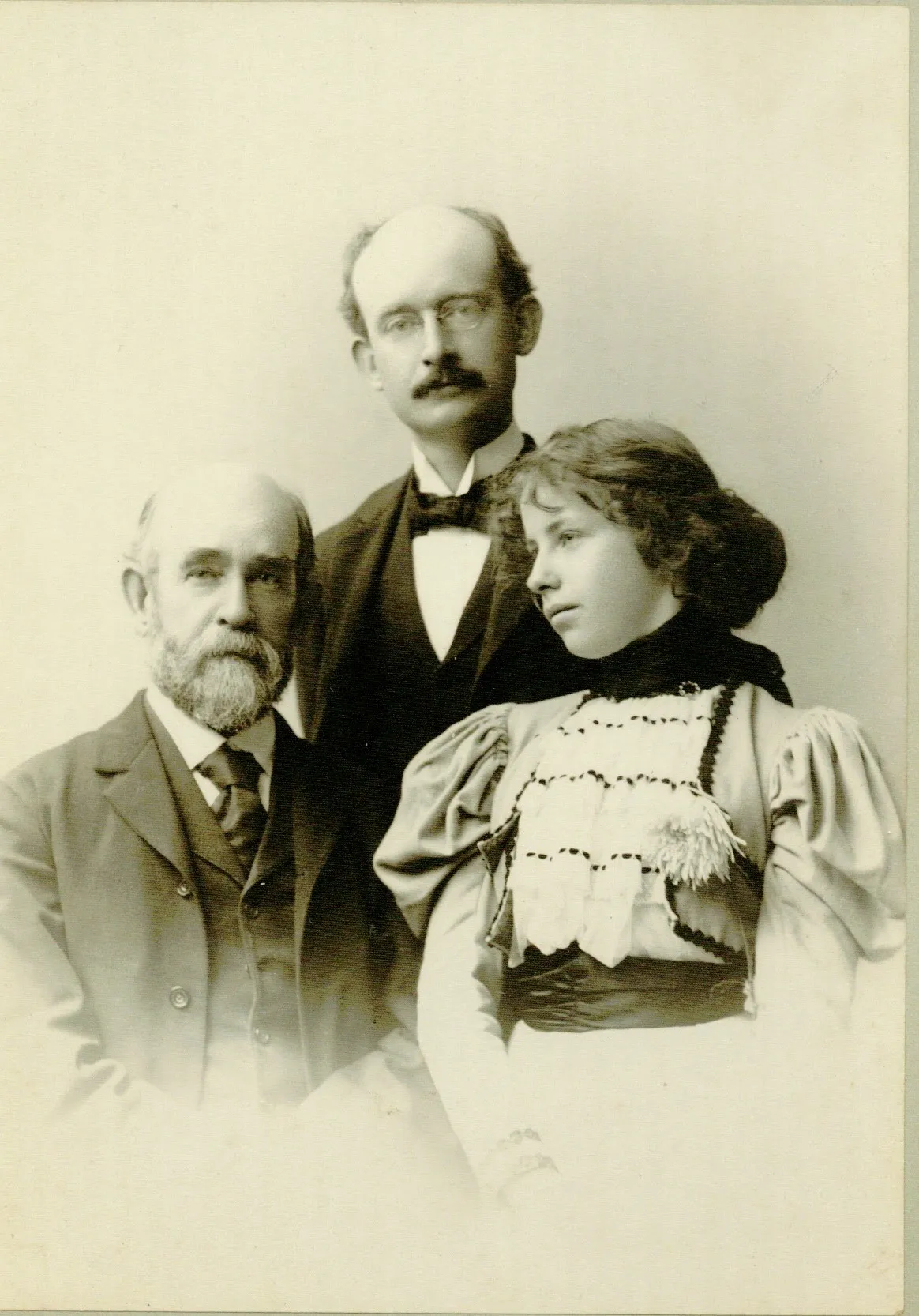
George with his father Henry George and sister Anna c. 1897

George was born in Sacramento, California, and attended the schools there. At the age of sixteen, he started working for a printing office, where he was employed for one year.

He moved with his parents to Brooklyn in 1880 and worked as a reporter for the Brooklyn Eagle in 1881. In 1884, he accompanied his father as his secretary on a lecture tour of Great Britain, at the close of which he joined the staff of the London Truth. He then returned to the United States and joined the staff of the North American Review. He was then managing editor of the Standard from 1887 to 1891, a correspondent in Washington, D.C. for a syndicate of western papers in 1891 and a correspondent in England for the same syndicate in 1892. In 1893, George became the managing editor of the Florida Citizen at Jacksonville, Florida.

He returned to New York City in 1895. Upon the death of his father on October 29, 1897, he was nominated to succeed his father as the candidate of the Jefferson Democracy Party for mayor of New York City, but he was unsuccessful. He married Marie Morelle Hitch (born January 22, 1879. She is Caroline Takamine Beach's younger sister.) from Orleans Parish, Louisiana on December 2, 1897 and was a special correspondent in Japan in 1906.

=== Congress ===
George was elected as a Democrat to the Sixty-second and Sixty-third Congresses (March 4, 1911 – March 4, 1915). However, he was not a candidate for reelection in 1914.

=== Later career and death ===
He engaged in literary pursuits until his death in Washington, D.C. and was interred in Green-Wood Cemetery in Brooklyn.

== Works ==
- The Life of Henry George (1904)
- The Menace of Privilege (1905)

U.S. House of Representatives
Preceded by William S. Bennet	Member of the U.S. House of Representatives from New York's 17th congressional district 1911–1913	Succeeded by John F. Carew
Preceded by Richard E. Connell	Member of the U.S. House of Representatives from New York's 21st congressional district 1913–1915	Succeeded by G. Murray Hulbert
