= Caroline Takamine Beach =

American socialite

- Caroline Hitch in 1884, from a 1978 book
- Born: Caroline Fields Hitch; August 5, 1866; Fairhaven, Massachusetts
- Died: November 25, 1954 (aged 88); Tucson, Arizona
- Occupation: Socialite
- Spouse(s): Jokichi Takamine, Charles P. Beach
- Relatives: Agnes de Mille (sister's niece), Henry George Jr. (brother-in-law)

Caroline Fields Hitch Takamine Beach (August 5, 1866 – November 25, 1954) was an American socialite and philanthropist. She married Japanese chemist Jokichi Takamine in 1887, and in 1935 donated a shrine in Arizona to the Roman Catholic Diocese of Tucson in his memory.

== Early life ==
Caroline Field Hitch was born in Fairhaven, Massachusetts (some sources give Falmouth as her birthplace), the daughter of Ebenezer Vose Hitch and Mary Beatrice Fields Hitch. Choreographer Agnes de Mille was her relative, through "an intricate series of family marriages" (de Mille's uncle, politician Henry George Jr., was Hitch's brother-in-law). Hitch is sometimes referred to as de Mille's aunt, and her life fascinated the young de Mille. "There was an aura sanctioned and blessed about her that no one ever questioned," de Mille wrote in 1978. "She had the kind of presence that made everyone rise, men of course, but women too, and without knowing who she was, not only in Japan but everywhere she went. Her tact, her courtesy, became legendary, A welcome from Takamine-san, no matter what your age, was like a diplomatic recognition. She was the supreme example, the Queen."

== Public activities ==
Caroline Takamine's interracial and intercultural marriage was a matter of some public interest. "No woman in the world is more protected and better cared for than the wife of a Japanese," she told an interviewer in 1909. "The Japanese husband is considerate, faithful, and patient." She did not speak much Japanese, but she was a social hostess for Japanese visitors to New York, including Prince Kuni Kuniyoshi in 1909. Her name was mentioned in the 1920 trial of tennis player Edwin P. Fischer in connection with an explosion on Wall Street, because Fischer had her calling card in his pocket when he was examined by authorities.

After her first husband died, she oversaw the publication of an English-language biography of Takamine, K. K. Kawakami's Jokichi Takamine: A Record of His American Achievements (1928). In the 1930s she designed, built, and gave the Shrine of St. Rita in the Desert, a small chapel in Vail, Arizona, to the Diocese of Tucson in memory of her first husband; It is "the only Catholic Church in the United States built in memory of a Japanese citizen".

== Personal life ==
Hitch met her first husband, chemist Jokichi Takamine, in 1884, at the World Cotton Centennial Exposition in New Orleans. They married in that city three years later, in 1887. She was one of the first American women to marry a Japanese man, and she lost her American citizenship by marrying a foreigner. They had two sons, Jokichi Jr. (Jo) and Ebenezer (Eben), both born in Tokyo before 1890. The Takamine family moved to the United States in 1890; they lived in Peoria, Chicago, and New York, while her husband was working in whisky processing using his patented method, and later studying adrenaline. In 1902 she bought land near her family in Sullivan County, New York, for their summer residence. The couple moved to Passaic, New Jersey in their later years together. Her husband died in 1922, after years of poor health. She was executor of his estate, and traveled to Japan with her younger son to fulfill those duties.

Caroline Hitch Takamine remarried in 1926, to one of her son's friends, a young rancher named Charles Pablo Beach, in Tucson, Arizona. Her elder son died in 1930. Her younger son was able to gain United States citizenship in 1953, under the McCarran-Walter Act. He died that same year. Caroline Takamine Beach died in 1954, aged 88 years, in Vail. Her grave is with her first husband's, in a mausoleum at Woodlawn Cemetery in the Bronx.

== Legacy ==
Agnes de Mille wrote about Caroline Takamine Beach in her 1978 memoir, Where the Wings Grow. Beach's grandson Jokichi Takamine III (1924–2013) was a physician who specialized in addiction medicine. She was played by actress Naomi Grace in the 2010 film Sakura, Sakura and in the 2011 sequel, Takamine. The church she built in Arizona continues as an active parish in the Diocese of Tucson, and was added to the National Register of Historic Places in 2015; the parish marked its 85th anniversary in 2019.
