= Carvey–Gatfield House =

Historic house in New York, United States

- Carvey-Gatfield House
- U.S. National Register of Historic Places
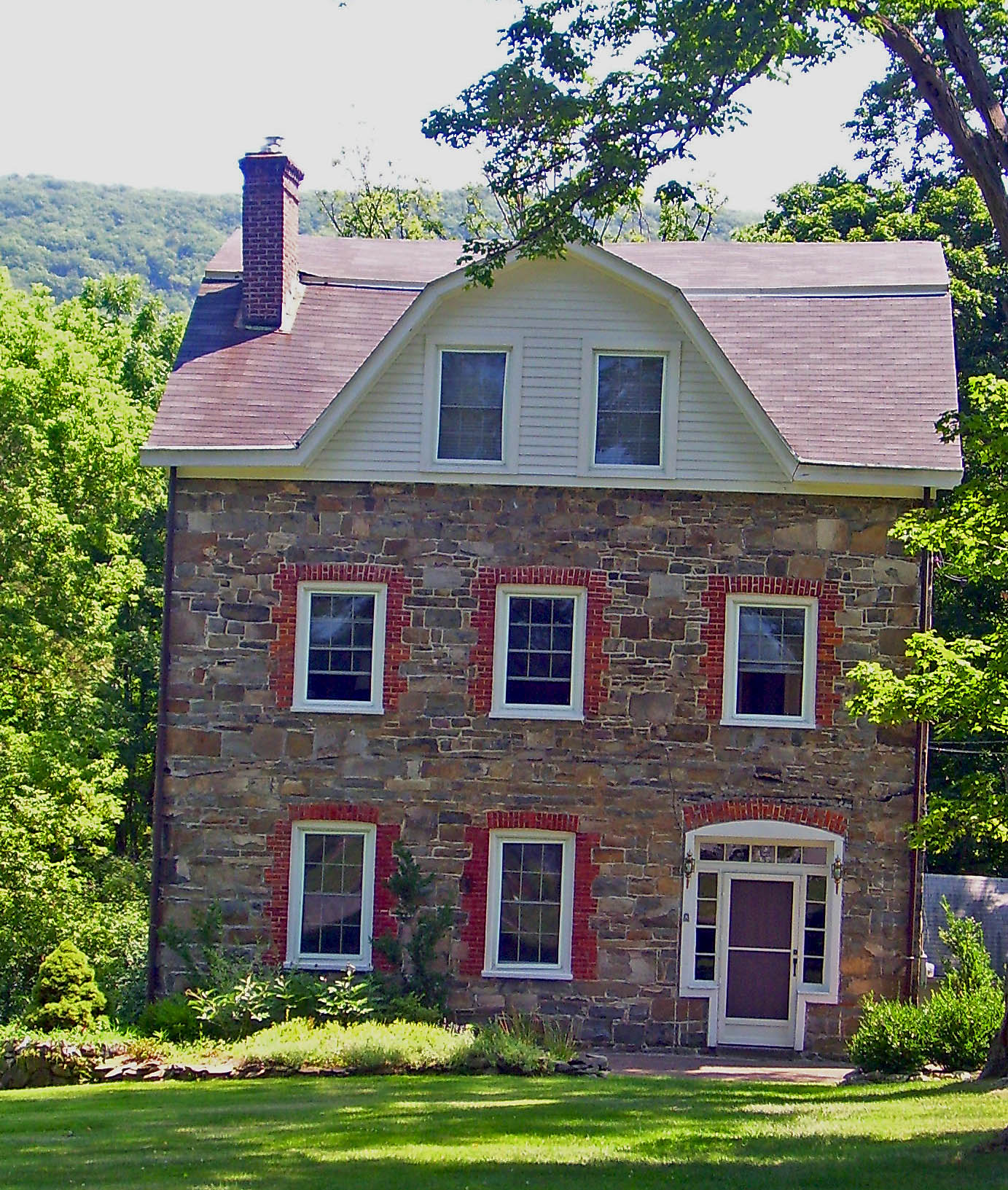
- House in 2007

- Location within New York Location within the United States
- Location: 375 Angola Rd., Cornwall, New York
- Nearest city: Newburgh
- Coordinates: 41°24′39″N 74°03′21″W
- Area: 2.4 acres (1 ha)
- Built: c. 1800-1810
- Architectural style: Federal
- MPS: Cornwall
- NRHP reference No.: 96000152
- Added to NRHP: March 8, 1996

The Carvey–Gatfield House (originally called the Carney-Gatfield House) is a historic house located at 375 Angola Road in Cornwall, Orange County, New York.

== Building ==
The land was originally the property of Isaac Bobbin, an early settler, until being subdivided into the present parcel and sold to Mathias Carvey in 1805, around the time the stone house was built. The house was built in the first decade of the 19th century in the then-dominant Federal style, with two storeys, three bays and a sidehall plan. However, it also features some unique touches such as a gambrel roof, with a corresponding dormer added later. It also appears taller than it actually is due to the sloping land beneath. An original front porch that ran the width of the house was removed during the 20th century.

Two of its features, a low-pitched roof on a two-story dwelling and a wide top section, suggest some connection to New England building traditions. Decorative sidelights, transom light around the entryway and brick surrounds on the front windows show the slow move from the vernacular styles of the colonial era to the Federal style of American independence, which put more emphasis on a decorative facade.

The house's interior has not been significantly altered since its construction. The original wall finishings are gone, but much of the woodwork and molding remains.

Two other buildings are located on the property: a barn, also gambrel-roofed, and a garage. The former dates to the original construction of the house and is considered a contributing resource; the latter is more contemporary and does not contribute to the historic value of the house.

== History ==
Carvey purchased the property from William Robinson, two owners removed from Bobbin, to support his mill on a nearby stream. After Carvey's death, his wife, the former Eleanor Wheeler, continued to run the farm, even after the death of her second husband, Rev. William Pearce. She, in turn, left the property to her nephew, Benjamin Gatfield, the son of her deceased sister, Katherine Wheeler, and the former wife of Archibald Gatfield (also deceased).Benjamin Gatfield and his brother Archibald lived on the property with their widowed aunt, assisting her with the running of the farm. Another sister of Eleanor Wheeler Carvey Pearce, Diana Wheeler Gatfield Harwick, who married her brother-in-law, Archibald Gatfield after the death of their sister Katherine, unsuccessfully contested the will together with her second husband, Justus Harwick. The house would remain in the Gatfield family for almost a century. After the deaths of Benjamin and Archibald Gatfield, the property was inhabited by their half-brother, George S. Gatfield - a son of Diana Wheeler Gatfield Hardick and Archibald Gatfield.

It was added to the National Register of Historic Places on March 8, 1996.
