= Jokichi Takamine =

Japanese chemist (1854–1922)

- 高峰 譲吉
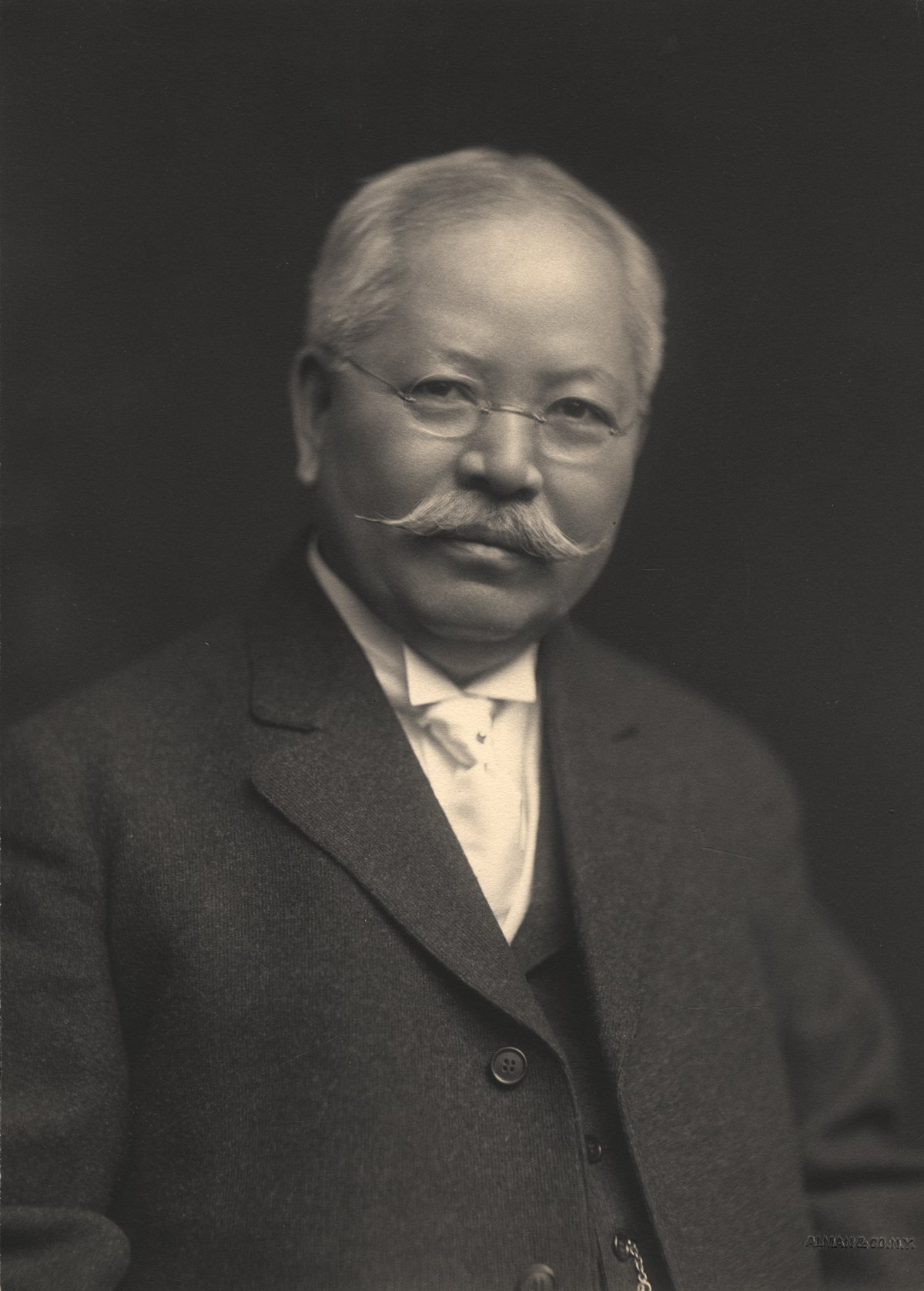
- Born: November 3, 1854; Takaoka, Toyama, Japan
- Died: July 22, 1922 (aged 67); New York, New York, US
- Citizenship: Japanese
- Education: University of Tokyo
- Known for: isolating and purifying adrenaline, isolating takadiastase
- Awards: Japan Academy Prize (1912)
- Scientific career
- Fields: Chemistry

Jokichi Takamine (高峰 譲吉, Takamine Jōkichi; November 3, 1854 – July 22, 1922) was a Japanese chemist. He is known for being the first to isolate adrenaline in 1901.

== Early life and education ==
Takamine was born in Takaoka, Toyama Prefecture, in November 1854. His father was a doctor; his mother a member of a family of sake brewers. He spent his childhood in Kanazawa, capital of present-day Ishikawa Prefecture in central Honshū. He learned English as a child from a Dutch family in Nagasaki, and so always spoke English with a Dutch accent. He was educated in Osaka, Kyoto, and Tokyo, graduating from one of the predecessors of Tokyo Imperial University in 1879. He did postgraduate work at University of Glasgow and Anderson College in Scotland until 1883.

== Career ==
=== Japan ===
In 1883, Takamine returned to Japan and joined the division of chemistry at the newly established Department of Agriculture and Commerce until 1887. He then founded the Tokyo Artificial Fertilizer Company, where he later isolated the enzyme takadiastase, an enzyme that catalyzes the breakdown of starch. Takamine developed his diastase from koji, a fungus used in the manufacture of soy sauce and miso. Its Latin name is Aspergillus oryzae, and it is a "designated national fungus" (kokkin) in Japan.

=== United States ===
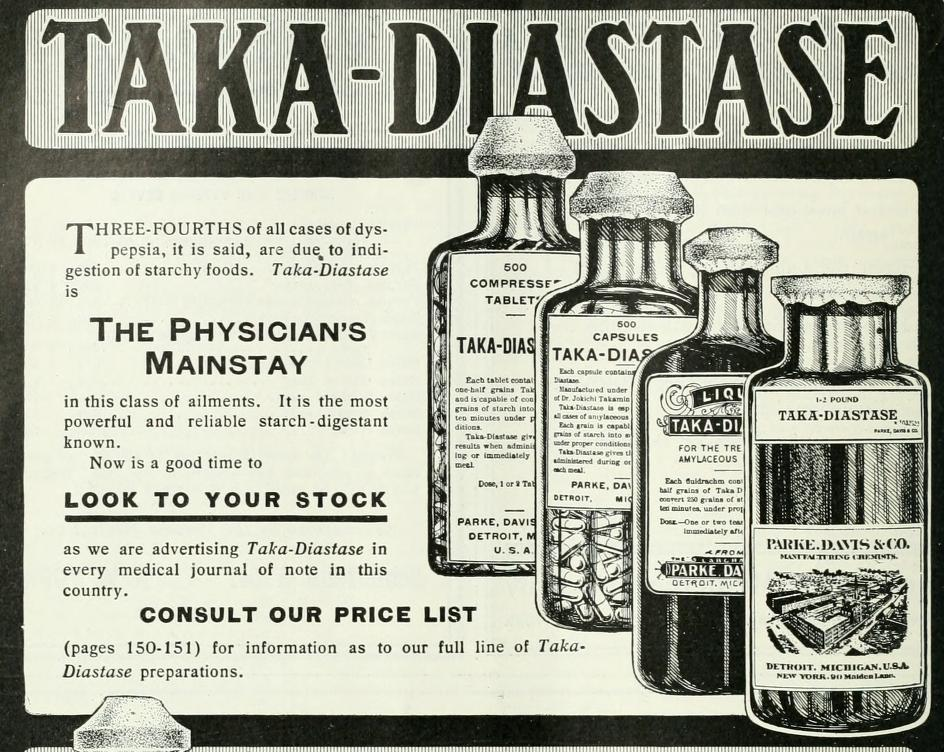
Taka-diastase advertisement in 1905

In 1884, Takamine went as co-commissioner of the World Cotton Centennial Exposition to New Orleans, where he met Lafcadio Hearn and 18 year old Caroline Field Hitch, his future wife. In 1885, he became the temporary Chief of the Japanese Patent Office and helped to lay the foundations of patent administration. He founded he Tokyo Artificial Fertilizer Company, importing large amounts of phosphate from Charleston, South Carolina. In 1890, he emigrated with his wife and two sons to Chicago.

He established his own research laboratory in New York City but licensed the exclusive production rights for takadiastase to one of the largest US pharmaceutical companies, Parke-Davis. This turned out to be a shrewd move as he became a millionaire in a relatively short time and by the early 20th century was estimated to be worth $30 million.

In 1894, Takamine applied for, and was granted, a US patent titled "Process of Making Diastatic Enzyme" (U.S. patent 525,823), the first patent on a microbial enzyme in the United States.

In 1901, he isolated and purified the hormone adrenaline, which became the first effective bronchodilator for asthma from animal glands, becoming the first to accomplish this for a glandular hormone.

In 1904, the Emperor Meiji of Japan honored Takamine with an unusual gift. In the context of the St. Louis World Fair (Louisiana Purchase Exposition), the Japanese government had replicated a historical Japanese structure, the "Pine and Maple Palace" (Shofu-den), modelled after the Kyoto Imperial Coronation Palace of 1,300 years ago. This structure was given to Dr. Takamine in grateful recognition of his efforts to further friendly relations between Japan and the United States. He had the structure transported in sections from Missouri to his summer home in upstate New York, seventy-five miles north of New York City. In 1909, the structure served as a guest house for Prince Kuni Kuniyoshi and Princess Kuni of Japan, who were visiting the area. Although the property was sold in 1922, the reconstructed structure remained in its serene setting. In 2008, it still continues to be one of the undervalued tourist attractions of New York's Sullivan County.

In 1905, Takamine founded the Nippon Club, which was for many years located at 161 West 93rd Street in Manhattan.

Takamine devoted his life to maintaining goodwill between the US and Japan.

In 1912, the mayor of Tokyo (Yukio Ozaki) and Jokichi Takamine gifted cherry blossom trees, which were planted in the West Potomac Park surrounding the Tidal Basin in Washington, DC.

A 1915 photo presents Jōkichi Takamine as the host for a banquet honoring the visiting Japanese diplomat Baron Eiichi Shibusawa. This illustration is linked to Jōkichi Takamine's involvement in the gifting of the cherry blossom trees to Washington, DC in 1912, which has evolved into the National Cherry Blossom Festival which is celebrated yearly.

=== Industrial fermentation and distilled spirits ===
In the late 1880s and early 1890s, Takamine applied his research on enzymatic fermentation to the production of distilled spirits, developing a process that used the koji mold (Aspergillus oryzae) used in making sake to convert starches into fermentable sugars. Unlike traditional whisky production, which relies on enzymes produced during the malting of barley, Takamine's method employed the strong saccharifying enzymes of koji to achieve rapid and efficient starch conversion.

Takamine promoted this process as a means of reducing production costs and increasing alcohol yield, and in the early 1890s he collaborated with American distilling interests in the Midwestern United States to test the method on an industrial scale. Contemporary reports described the technique as technically successful, and predicted that it could significantly alter established distilling practices.

Despite these early trials, the process was not widely adopted. The collapse of the American whiskey trust with which Takamine was associated, combined with legal disputes and the suspicious destruction of experimental facilities by fire, brought the project to an end by the mid-1890s. Takamine subsequently shifted his focus to enzyme pharmaceuticals and medical research, areas in which he achieved lasting commercial and scientific success.

Although Takamine's fermentation method did not influence mainstream whisky production during his lifetime, it has been retrospectively cited as an early example of cross-cultural experimentation in industrial alcohol production, and has attracted renewed attention in the 21st century through historically inspired distilling projects.

== Personal life ==
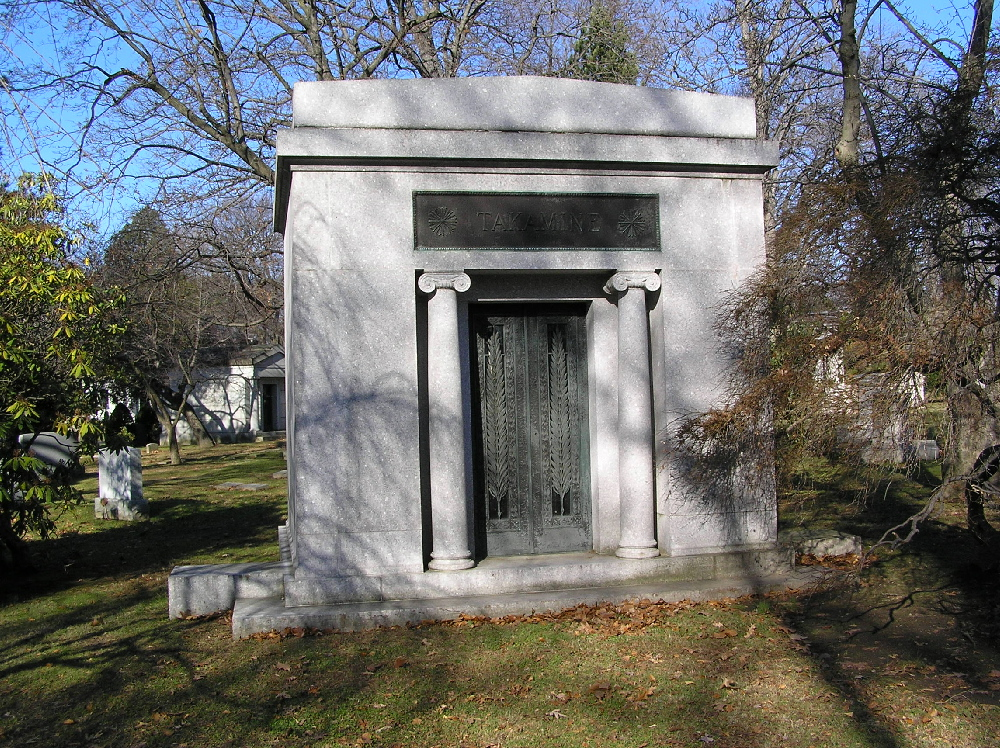
The mausoleum of Jokichi Takamine in Woodlawn Cemetery, Bronx, New York City

On August 10, 1887, Takamine travelled to the US and married Caroline Field Hitch in New Orleans. They had two sons Jokichi Takamine, born 1888 in Tokyo, Japan, and Ebenezer Takashi Takamine born in 1889. The family emigrated to the US arriving in Chicago in December 1890. Due to her influence he converted to Catholicism. According to historical records, he would maintain this faith throughout his life.

== Awards and honors ==
- In 1899, Takamine was awarded an honorary Doctorate in Engineering by what is now the University of Tokyo.
- On April 18, 1985, the Japan Patent Office selected him as one of Ten Japanese Great Inventors.
- In 2024 he was posthumously inducted into the National Inventors Hall of Fame for his research leading to use of adrenaline (epinephrine) in medicine.

== In popular culture ==
As of 2011, two films about the life of Takamine have been made by Toru Ichikawa. In the 2010 film Sakura, Sakura Takamine was portrayed by Masaya Kato. A sequel titled Takamine, also directed by Ichikawa and starring Hatsunori Hasegawa, was released in 2011.

As of 2009, the Takamine home in Kanazawa could still be seen. It was relocated to near the grounds of Kanazawa Castle in 2001.

== See also ==
- National Cherry Blossom Festival
