= Daniel W. Sutherland =

American government official

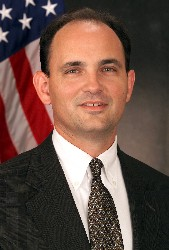

Officer for Civil Rights & Civil Liberties Department of Homeland Security
- In office 2003 – (End date unknown)
- Preceded by: None

Personal details
- Education: University of Virginia School of Law; University of Louisville
- Occupation: Attorney

Daniel W. Sutherland is the former Officer for Civil Rights and Civil Liberties at the U.S. Department of Homeland Security. He was appointed to the position on April 16, 2003, by George W. Bush and served until January 2009.

Sutherland currently serves as the Associate General Counsel of the U.S. Department of Homeland Security, where he leads the National Protection and Programs Legal Division. His client, the National Protection and Programs Directorate, is responsible for cybersecurity, telecommunications, biometrics and infrastructure resilience. He oversees the provision of legal advice to the National Cybersecurity and Communications Integration Center (NCCIC), the largest cyber operations center in the civilian government. His division also negotiates complex technology agreements, advocates the agency's positions in litigation, provides fiscal and administrative law advice to the organization, and responds to audits and investigations.

He served fourteen years with the Civil Rights Division of the U.S. Department of Justice and nearly two years with the Office for Civil Rights at the U.S. Department of Education, where he was Chief of Staff. In addition, he served as the first Executive Director of the Brown v. Board of Education 50th Anniversary Commission. He has also served at the White House, with the Domestic Policy Council, and at the Bush-Cheney Transition headquarters.

In his career as a civil rights attorney, Sutherland handled many important lawsuits, primarily in the areas of discrimination against immigrants and discrimination against people with disabilities, such as in the case of PGA Tour, Inc. v. Martin. At the Department of Education, he worked on issues relating to racial discrimination (especially against Arab-Americans) and disability law. His 2005 speech "Cementing Positive Relationships: Increasing the Level of Communication Between the Department of Homeland Security and Arab-American and Muslim-American Communities," was published in the journal Vital Speeches of the Day.

In 2008, President Bush nominated Sutherland to serve as the first Executive Director of the Privacy and Civil Liberties Oversight Board. The Senate did not take action on the nomination and it expired at the end of the 2007-8 Congressional session.

He co-authored the book Religion in the Workplace, a book describing federal laws governing claims of religious discrimination in employment settings, which was published by the American Bar Association in 1998. He has also written numerous articles and speeches.

Sutherland graduated from the University of Virginia School of Law and the University of Louisville, where he won the National Debate Tournament in 1982.
