= Cromwell Manor =

Historic house in New York, United States

- U.S. National Register of Historic Places
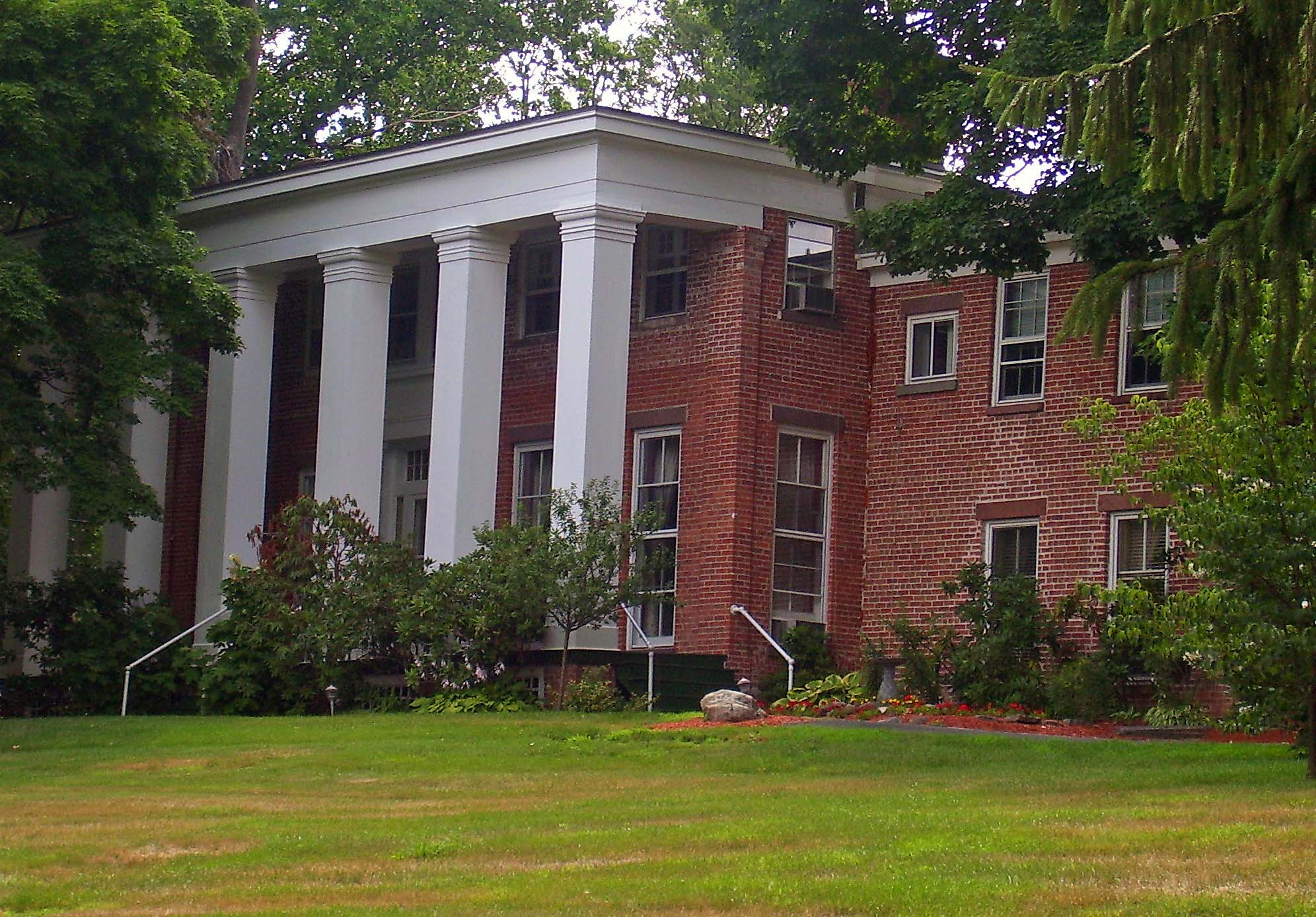
- Front (east) elevation of manor in 2007

- Location within New York
- Interactive map showing the location of Cromwell Manor
- Location: Cornwall, NY
- Nearest city: Newburgh
- Coordinates: 41°25′35″N 74°02′38″W
- Area: 7 acres (3 ha)
- Built: 1820
- Architectural style: Greek Revival
- MPS: Historic and Architectural Resources of Cornwall
- NRHP reference No.: 96000555
- Added to NRHP: June 3, 1996

Cromwell Manor, also known as the David Cromwell House and Joseph Sutherland House, is located on Angola Road in Cornwall, New York, United States, just south of its intersection with US 9W. It consists of four properties, two of which are of note: the 1820 manor house, built in a Greek Revival style and added onto in 1840 and a 1779 cottage known as The Chimneys, the original home on the site.

When built, it was one of the first large houses in rural Cornwall built as a luxury home rather than a farmhouse, and one of the few Greek Revival buildings built of brick in the town. After over a century as a Cromwell family home, it was sold and became a teachers' retreat. As of 2022, it is being operated as the Cromwell Manor Historic Inn, with both properties available to guests. In 1996 it was added to the National Register of Historic Places.

== Property ==
There are four contributing properties on the seven-acre (3 ha) lot: the main house, The Chimneys, another guest house and a privy. A well and garage are not considered contributing since they date only to the 20th century.

The main house is a brick two-story, five-bay brick structure with a full front portico supported by six large square columns, sitting at the top of a low rise, looking out toward the east on the mountains of Black Rock Forest in the Hudson Highlands. The roof is flat, with a cornice and plain frieze at the roofline and four chimneys at each corner. A two-story rectangular wing connects to the north end, and a screened porch runs the length of the west (rear) elevation.

On both front and rear the windows have sandstone sills and lintels. The main entrance is a paneled, glazed wood door with molded surround and sidelights. It is flanked by plain pilasters that support a molded entablature that reaches to the second story.

Inside, the house follows a center hall plan. Many of its original features remain intact, including molded ceilings and architraves and marble mantels. Sliding pocket doors divide the parlors.

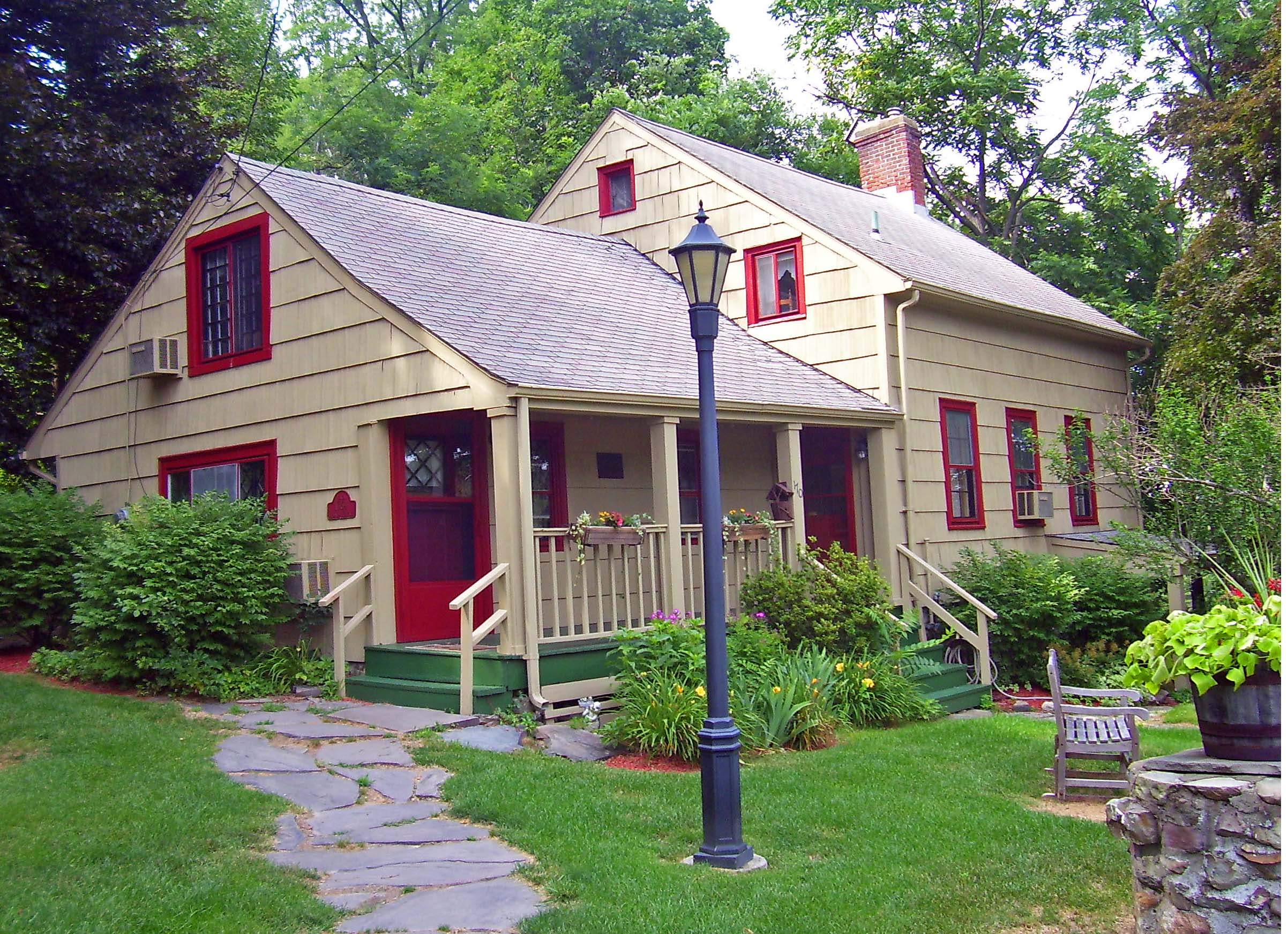
The Chimneys

The Chimneys, also the Joseph Sutherland House, is a shingle-sided frame cottage on a stone foundation. It consists of two blocks, a main one-and-a-half-story section three bays wide with a one-story, two-bay addition on the south. Its interior has been extensively renovated since its construction but the Dutch door, wide board flooring and mantel remain. A non-contributing well is located in front of the cottage.

The guest house, a frame gable-roofed structure, is located to the west. The frame privy is to the southwest. The modern garage is northeast.

== History ==
The Sutherland family, one of Cornwall's oldest, bought most of the property today's Angola Road runs through in the 18th century (The houses of Daniel and David are to the northeast, closer to downtown along the road). Joseph Sutherland built the small cottage around 1779, where he operated a tavern. He also worked as a shoemaker on the side.

David Cromwell, a local merchant and gentleman farmer, by some accounts a descendant of Oliver Cromwell, who overthrew the British crown in the mid-17th century, bought the property from the Sutherland family in 1830. He lived in the Sutherland house until the manor was complete around 1835. This larger house was a departure in style and purpose from those that had been built in rural Cornwall until then, a style serving those who did not derive most of their income from the surrounding farm. Cromwell's further distinguished itself by using brick.

The guest house was added in 1840 and the privy 50 years later, around 1890. Cromwell Manor remained in the family until 1941, when Emily Cromwell sold it to the Association of Retired Teachers of the City of New York (a venerable organization, also known as A.R.T., founded in 1919). A.R.T. used it as a retreat for its members, retired New York City teachers, until selling it to its present owners in 1988.
