= Francis Emanuel Shober =

American politician (1860–1919)

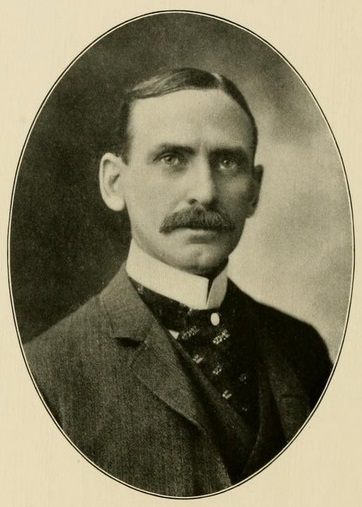

Member of the U.S. House of Representatives from New York's 17th district
- In office March 4, 1903 – March 3, 1905
- Preceded by: Arthur S. Tompkins
- Succeeded by: William Stiles Bennet

Personal details
- Born: October 24, 1860 Salisbury, North Carolina, U.S.
- Died: October 7, 1919 (aged 58) New York City, U.S.
- Resting place: Worcester Cemetery, Danbury, Connecticut, U.S.
- Party: Democratic
- Parent: Francis Edwin Shober (father)
- Profession: Politician, educator, newspaperman, religious leader

Francis Emanuel Shober (October 24, 1860 – October 7, 1919) was an American politician, educator, newspaperman, and religious leader who served one term as a U.S. representative from New York from 1903 to 1905. He was the son of Francis Edwin Shober.

== Biography ==
Born in Salisbury, North Carolina, Shober studied under private tutors. He was graduated from St. Stephen's College, Annandale, New York, in 1880. He engaged in ministerial and educational work in Dutchess County, New York. Reporter on the News-Press of Poughkeepsie. Pastor of St. John's Episcopal Church at Barrytown, New York from 1880 to 1891.

He was editor of the Rockaway Journal at Far Rockaway, New York. He served as member of the editorial staff of the New York World.

=== Congress ===
Shober was elected as a Democrat to the Fifty-eighth Congress (March 4, 1903 – March 3, 1905). He was an unsuccessful candidate for renomination in 1904. Deputy tax appraiser of the State of New York in 1907 and 1908.

=== Later career and death ===
He resumed newspaper work. He was editor of the New York American until his death in New York City October 7, 1919. He was interred in Worcester Cemetery, Danbury, Connecticut.

== Sources ==
- United States Congress. "Francis Emanuel Shober (id: S000373)". Biographical Directory of the United States Congress.

U.S. House of Representatives
Preceded by Arthur S. Tompkins	Member of the U.S. House of Representatives from New York's 17th congressional district 1903-1905	Succeeded by William Stiles Bennet
