= Sutherland High School =

Sutherland High School may refer to:

- Sutherland High School, Centurion
- Heywood Community High School, formerly named Sutherland High School
- Pittsford Sutherland High School
