= Francis Edwin Shober =

American politician (1831–1896)

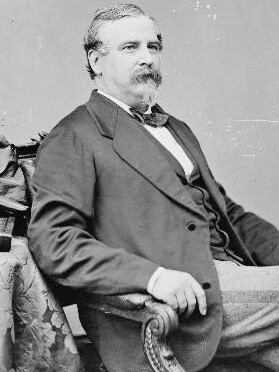

8th Secretary of the United States Senate
- In office March 24, 1879 – July 28, 1881
- Preceded by: John Christopher Burch
- Succeeded by: Anson G. McCook

County Judge of Rowan County, North Carolina
- In office 1877–1878

Member of the U.S. House of Representatives from North Carolina's 6th district
- In office March 4, 1869 – March 3, 1873
- Preceded by: Nathaniel Boyden
- Succeeded by: Thomas Samuel Ashe

Member of the North Carolina State Senate
- In office 1865

Member of the North Carolina House of Commons
- In office 1862–1864

Personal details
- Born: March 12, 1831 Salem, North Carolina
- Died: May 29, 1896 (aged 65)
- Party: Democratic
- Relatives: Francis Emanuel Shober (son); James Francis Shober (son)

Francis Edwin Shober (March 12, 1831 – May 29, 1896) was an American politician who served as U.S. Representative from North Carolina, secretary of the United States Senate, county judge, and a member of the North Carolina State House and North Carolina House of Commons. He was the father of Francis Emanuel Shober.

== Life and career ==
Born in Salem (now Winston-Salem), North Carolina, Shober attended the common schools and the Moravian School, Bethlehem, Pennsylvania. He graduated from the University of North Carolina at Chapel Hill in 1851. He read law, gained admission to the bar in 1853, and commenced practice in Salisbury, North Carolina, in 1854. He served in the North Carolina General Assembly of 1862–1864 House of Commons and again in the North Carolina General Assembly of 1865–1866 State Senate in 1865.

Shober was elected as a Democrat to the Forty-first and Forty-second Congresses (March 4, 1869 – March 3, 1873). He was not a candidate for renomination in 1872. He served as delegate to the State constitutional convention in 1875 and county judge of Rowan County in 1877 and 1878. He was appointed Chief Clerk of the United States Senate in the 45th Congress. Upon the death of Secretary John C. Burch in the 47th Congress, Shober was appointed Acting Secretary of the Senate and served from October 24, 1881, to December 18, 1883. He served as delegate to the Democratic National Conventions in 1880 and 1884. He again served in the North Carolina Senate in 1887, and then resumed the practice of his profession. He died in Salisbury, North Carolina, May 29, 1896. He was interred in Oakdale Cemetery in Wilmington.

Evidence indicates that Shober had a son, James Francis Shober, with an 18-year-old enslaved woman named Betsy Ann Waugh. His son was born in Salem in 1853 and became the first documented African American physician in North Carolina.

U.S. House of Representatives
Preceded by Nathaniel Boyden	Member of the U.S. House of Representatives from North Carolina's 6th congressional district 1869–1873	Succeeded by Thomas Samuel Ashe
