= Takadiastase =

Enzymatic extract from Aspergillus

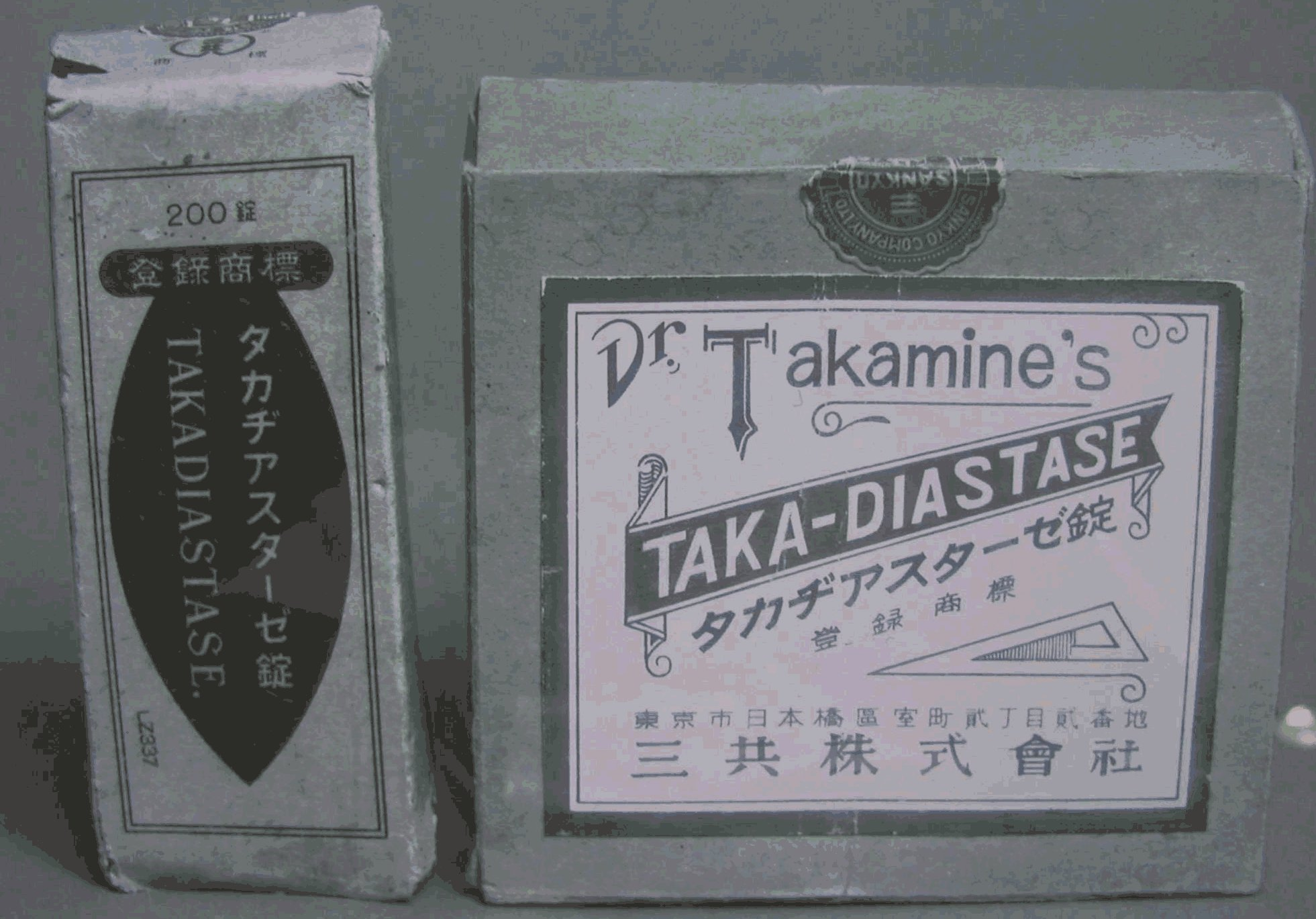
Takadiastase tablet from Sankyo.

Takadiastase is a form of diastase which results from the growth, development, and nutrition of a distinct microscopic fungus known as Aspergillus oryzae (Koji). Takadiastase is named after Jōkichi Takamine, who developed the method first used for its extraction.
