= David Sutherland House =

Historic house in New York, United States

- U.S. National Register of Historic Places
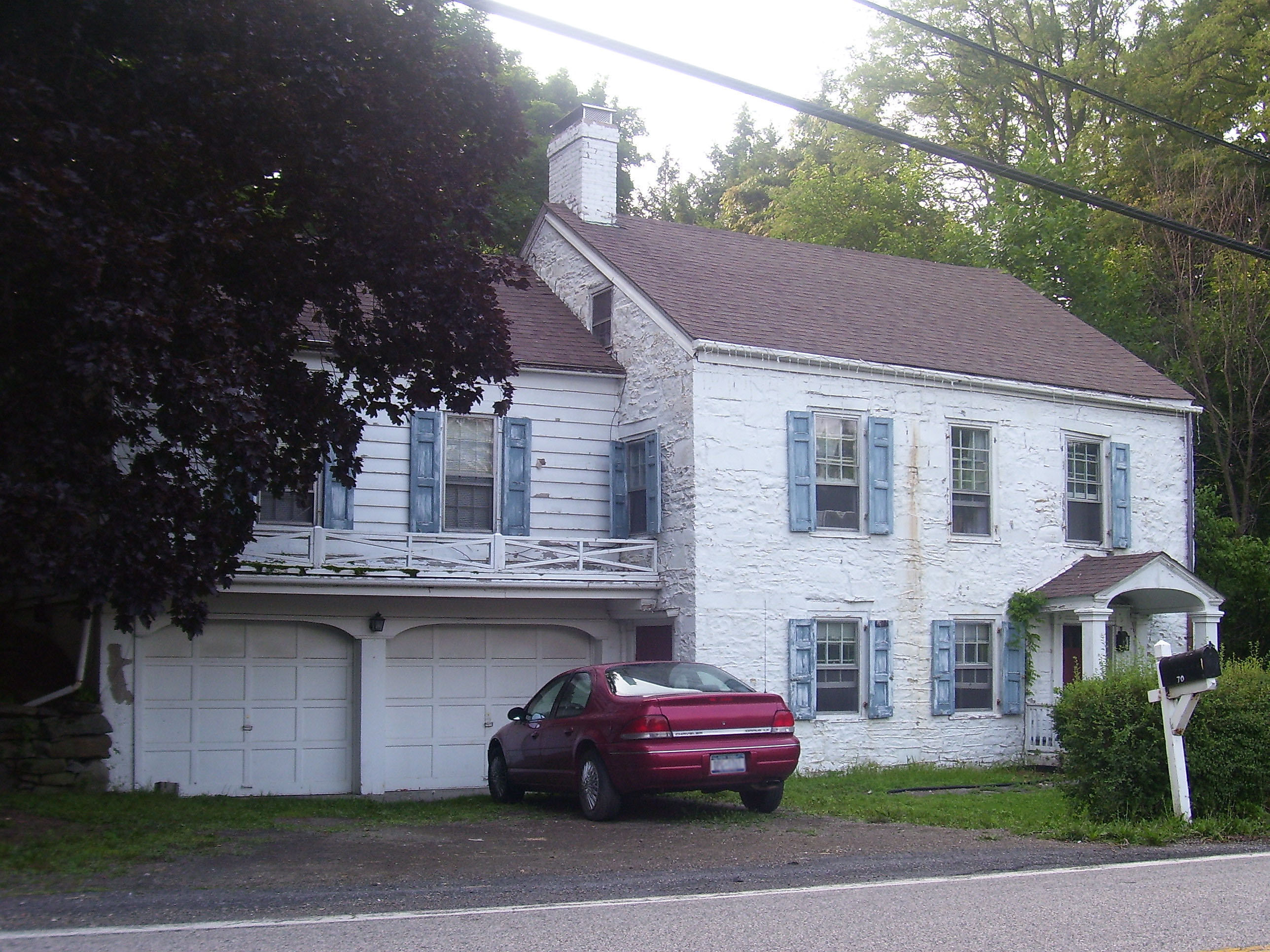
- The house in 2007
- Location: Cornwall, NY
- Nearest city: Newburgh
- Coordinates: 41°25′48″N 74°02′23″W
- Built: 1770
- Architect: David and Patrick Sutherland
- MPS: Town of Cornwall Multiple Resources
- NRHP reference No.: 96000146
- Added to NRHP: 1996

The David Sutherland House is one of three associated with that family along Angola Road in Cornwall, New York, United States. It is the oldest, a 1770 fieldstone structure (since painted white and added onto).

David was a descendant of William Sutherland, one of the town's first settlers. The family had been dispossessed of most of the large acreage they owned in the area, but some members had managed to keep, or later reacquire, small parcels. He built the house on one of them, now reduced and subdivided to the three-quarter acre (2,940 m^{2}) lot it stands one today. Due to the steep hillside, the house has no cellar and the top story is at ground level in the rear.

It has remained relatively unchanged since then. It is located on the north side of the road, about midway between downtown Cornwall and US 9W. The house of Sutherland's grandson Daniel is a short distance to the northeast, closer to town; his son Joseph's Cromwell Manor is a mile to the southwest. The inside of the house contains the original fireplace, with Federal style mantel, some doors, and timber supports in the kitchen.

Sutherland sold it to his nephew Patrick, a veteran of the Revolutionary War, in 1784. He was a person of some prominence in the town, and records indicate the Town Board met there in 1798 and again between 1800 and 1805. The year after that, he left the region for the Finger Lakes and the house has passed through many owners since. It was added to the National Register of Historic Places in 1996.
