= Daniel Sutherland House =

Historic house in New York, United States

- U.S. National Register of Historic Places
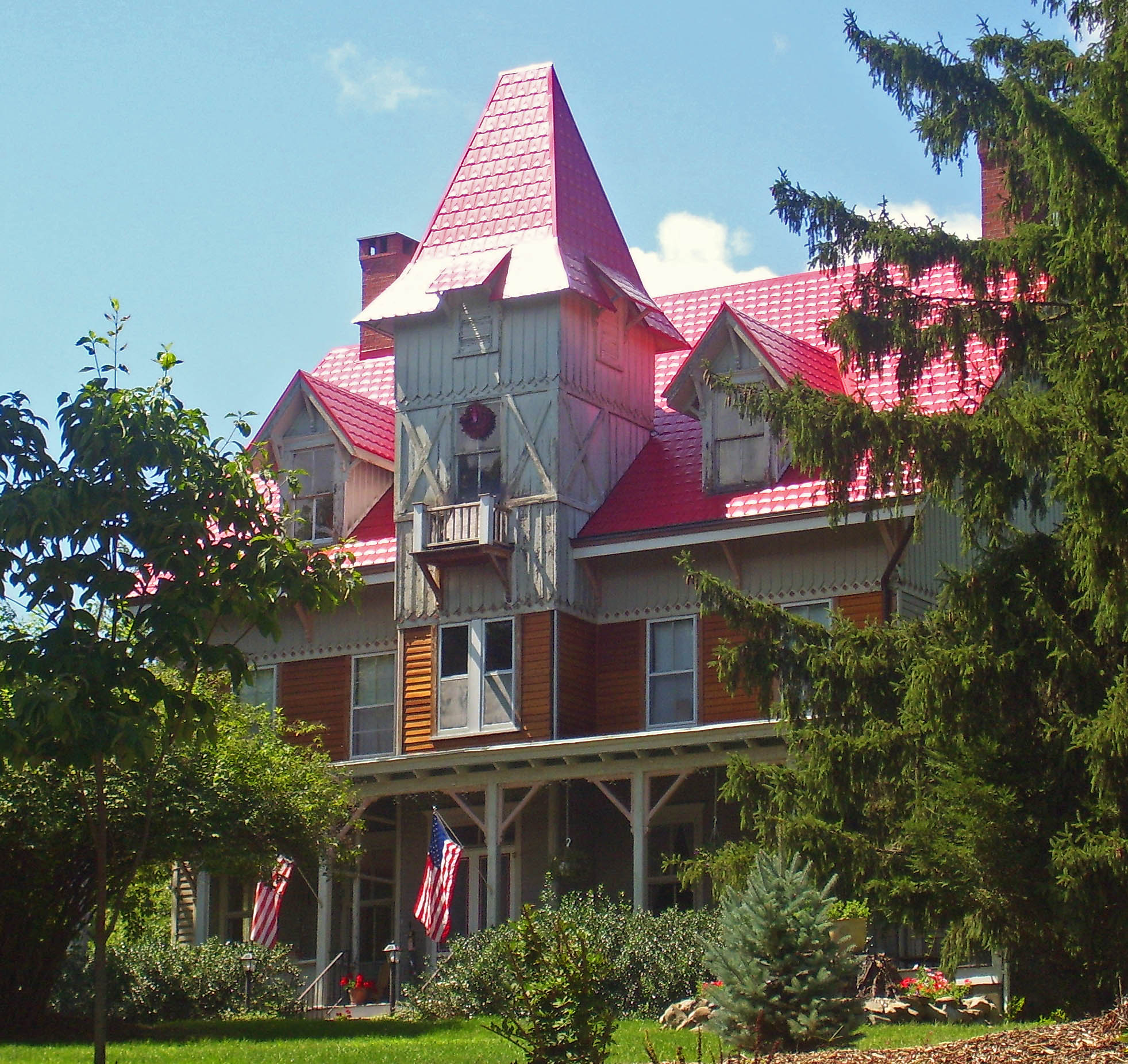
- House in 2007
- Location: Cornwall, NY
- Nearest city: Newburgh
- Coordinates: 41°26′02″N 74°02′14″W
- Area: 2 acres (8,000 m²)
- Built: 1886
- Architectural style: Stick-Eastlake
- MPS: Cornwall Multiple Resources
- NRHP reference No.: 96000147
- Added to NRHP: 1996

The Daniel Sutherland House is located on Angola Road in Cornwall, New York, United States. It is the late-19th century Stick-Eastlake style home of Sutherland, a grandson of David Sutherland, whose Colonial-era house is located further south on the road.

Sutherland, a local lawyer of prominence, bought several acres of his ancestral lands from the then-owners, the Chedeayne estate, around 1875. Eleven years later, he built the house in a vernacular interpretation of the then-popular Stick style. After his death the following year, his wife remarried, and around the turn of the century the building was used as a rooming house.

It has remained largely intact since its construction, with some more contemporary outbuildings. Much of the interior woodwork and furnishings are originals. It was added to the National Register of Historic Places in 1996.
