= Central Valley, New York =

- Hamlet
- Location within the state of New York
- Coordinates: 41°19′46″N 74°7′30″W
- Country: United States
- State: New York
- County: Orange

Area
  - Total: 2.7 sq mi (6.9 km^{2})
  - Land: 2.7 sq mi (6.9 km^{2})
  - Water: 0 sq mi (0.0 km^{2})
- Elevation: 522 ft (159 m)

Population (2000)
  - Total: 1,857
  - Density: 696/sq mi (268.9/km^{2})
- Time zone: UTC-5 (Eastern (EST))
  - Summer (DST): UTC-4 (EDT)
- ZIP code: 10917
- Area code: 845
- FIPS code: 36-13596
- GNIS feature ID: 0946324

Central Valley is a hamlet in Woodbury, New York, United States. The population was 1,857 at the 2000 census, at which time it was a census-designated place. It is part of the Kiryas Joel–Poughkeepsie–Newburgh metropolitan area as well as the larger New York metropolitan area.

Central Valley is in the southern part of the Town and Village of Woodbury. It is located along the New York State Thruway (Interstate 87 at Exit 16, approximately 95 miles south of Albany and 50 miles north of New York City.

The Woodbury Common Premium Outlets center is located in Central Valley.

== Geography ==
Central Valley is located at 41°19′46″N 74°7′30″W (41.329371, -74.125036).

According to the United States Census Bureau, the CDP has a total area of 2.7 square miles (7.0 km^{2}), all land.

== History ==
Meteorologist Jen Carfagno of The Weather Channel reported in Central Valley for an early March snowstorm in 2018 dubbed as "Quinn".

== Demographics ==
At the 2000 census there were 1,857 people, 656 households, and 509 families in the CDP. The population density was 696.4 inhabitants per square mile (268.9/km^{2}). There were 679 housing units at an average density of 254.6 per square mile (98.3/km^{2}). The racial makeup of the CDP was 94.02% White, 0.75% African American, 0.22% Native American, 1.35% Asian, 2.75% from other races, and 0.92% from two or more races. Hispanic or Latino of any race were 7.92%.

Of the 656 households 38.3% had children under the age of 18 living with them, 66.3% were married couples living together, 9.0% had a female householder with no husband present, and 22.3% were non-families. 17.5% of households were one person and 6.6% were one person aged 65 or older. The average household size was 2.83 and the average family size was 3.22.

The age distribution was 26.7% under the age of 18, 6.7% from 18 to 24, 30.4% from 25 to 44, 25.1% from 45 to 64, and 11.1% 65 or older. The median age was 37 years. For every 100 females, there were 99.0 males. For every 100 females age 18 and over, there were 97.4 males.

The median household income was $69,167 and the median family income was $79,690. Males had a median income of $51,890 versus $36,829 for females. The per capita income for the CDP was $29,205. About 1.3% of families and 3.2% of the population were below the poverty line, including 3.7% of those under age 18 and none of those age 65 or over.
