= Toro =

Toro may refer to:

== Places ==
- Toro, Molise, a comune in the Province of Campobasso, Italy
- Toro, Nigeria, a Local Government Area of Bauchi State, Nigeria
- Toro, Shizuoka, an archaeological site in Shizuoka Prefecture, Japan
- Toro, Spain, a municipality in the Province of Zamora, Castille and León, Spain
- Toro District, a district in the La Unión province, Peru
- Tooro Kingdom, a traditional kingdom in Uganda
- Toro sub-region, a region that is coterminous with the Toro Kingdom in Western Uganda
- Shakhtyorsk, a town in Sakhalin Oblast, Russia, known as Toro in Japanese
- 1685 Toro, an asteroid

== Companies ==
- The Toro Company, an American manufacturer of lawnmowers and other lawn equipment
- Toro (Norwegian company), a Norwegian food company

== People ==
- Toro (Khamba Thoibi), an 11th-12th century ancient Moirang woman of Angom clan
- Toró (born 1986), nickname of Brazilian footballer Rafael Ferreira Francisco
- Toro y Moi (born 1986), professional name of American singer Chaz Bear
- Abraham Toro (born 1996), Canadian baseball player
- Alfredo Toro Hardy (born 1950), Venezuelan diplomat and author
- David Toro, Bolivian dictator
- Gábor Törő, Hungarian politician
- Janet Toro (born 1963), Chilean performance artist
- Jorge Toro (1939–2024), Chilean footballer
- Julio Toro (born 1952), Puerto Rican basketball coach
- Manuel Murillo Toro (1816–1880), Colombian politician and statesman, twice President of the United States of Colombia
- Patricio Moreno Toro (born 1942), Chilean and American painter
- Ray Toro (born 1977), lead guitarist for the band My Chemical Romance
- Benicio del Toro (born 1967), Puerto Rican-American actor
- Guillermo del Toro (born 1964), Mexican film director
- Mary Lovelace O'Neal (1942–2026), also known as Mary Lovelace O'Neal Toro, American painter and educator

== Characters ==
- Toro Inoue, the mascot for Sony Computer Entertainment
- Toro (mascot), a mascot for the National Football League's Houston Texans franchise
- Toro (character), a Marvel Comics character
- Gim Toro, an Italian comics character
- Toro, a male Carnotaurus from the Netflix show Jurassic World Camp Cretaceous

== Animals ==
- Toro (rodent), a spiny rat in the genus Isothrix
- A name for some species of fish bigeye family
  - Priacanthus arenatus, the Atlantic bigeye
  - Pristigenys alta, the short bigeye

== Other uses ==
- Il Toro, or Torino F.C., an Italian football team
- Toro, a Spanish Fighting Bull used in bullfighting
- Toro, three turns on the track at Cesana Pariol for the 2006 Winter Olympics
- Toro (film), a 2015 film
- Toro (2016 film), a Spanish film
- Tōrō, a Japanese traditional lantern, originally from China
- Toro (tree), or Rapanea salicina, a New Zealand native tree
- Toro (DO), a Denominación de Origen for wine in Spain
- Toro (magazine), a defunct Canadian men's magazine
- Toro (sushi), fatty tuna used in sushi
- T'uru, also spelled Toro, a mountain in Peru
- Toro, the codename for the Verizon Wireless version of the Galaxy Nexus
- Toro Bravo, a type of cow also known as the Spanish fighting bull
- Fiat Toro, a pickup truck made in Brazil
- Oldsmobile Toronado, an automobile that was manufactured by the Oldsmobile division of General Motors
- TORO (Torque Controlled Humanoid Robot), a development of Justin (robot) by DLR

== See also ==
- El Toro (disambiguation)
- Doro (disambiguation)
- Tooro (disambiguation)
- TORRO
