= Doro =

Doro may refer to:

- Doro (musician), rock singer, former vocalist of the German heavy metal band Warlock
  - Doro (album), a 1990 album by Doro
- Dorothea Wierer, Italian biathlete
- Doro (company), a Swedish telecommunications company
- Doro, a fictional character in the Patternist series of novels by Octavia E. Butler
- DoRo Productions, a film company based in Austria, formerly known for their music videos
- SS Doro, originally SS Empire Deed, a Panamanian cargo ship in service 1951–1956
- Doro, South Sudan
- Doro, a nickname and a meme given to the character Dorothy from the game Goddess of Victory: Nikke.

== See also ==
- Toro (disambiguation)
