= Stone lantern =

Traditional Chinese and Japanese lantern

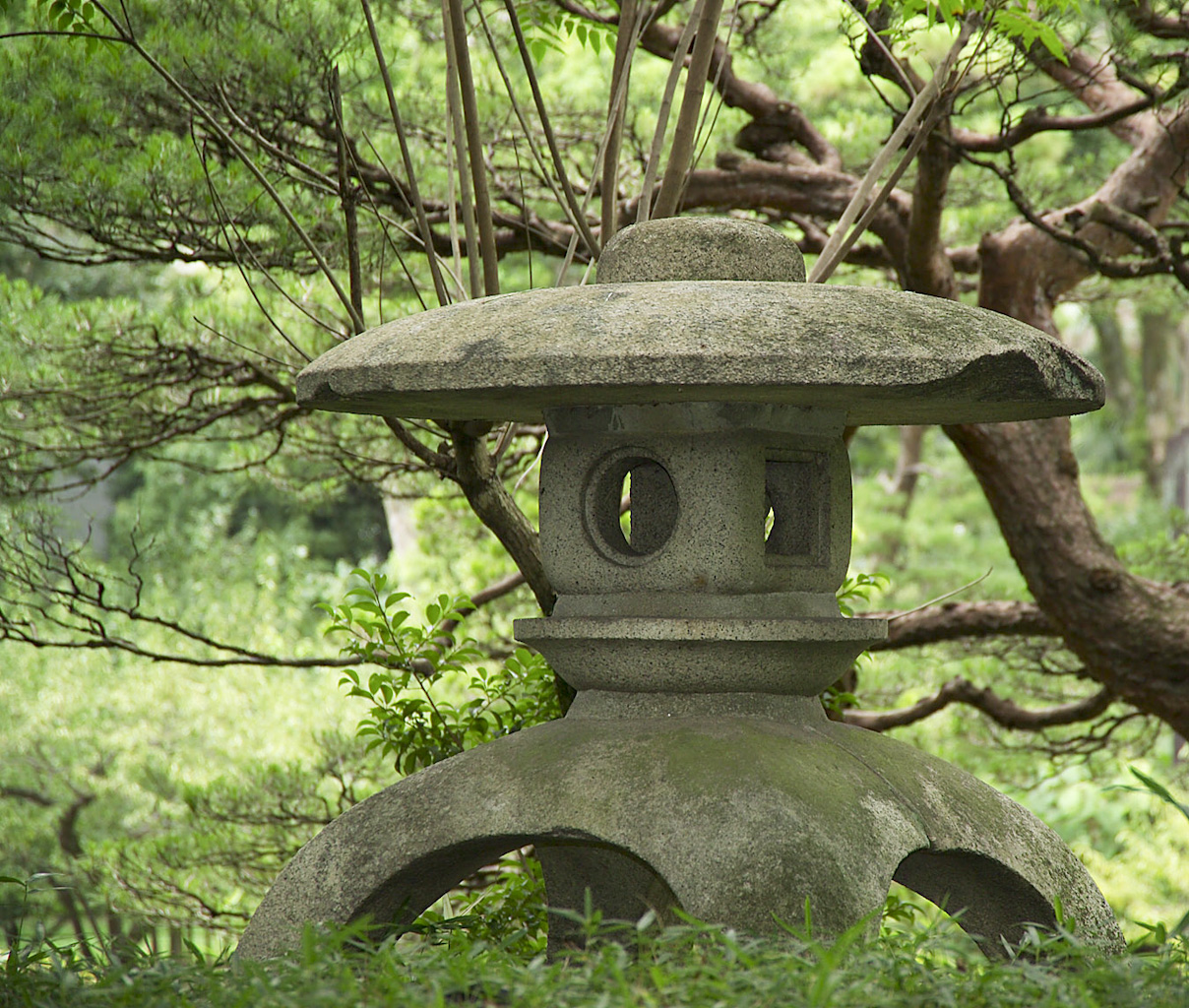
Tōrō at Shukkei-en Garden

Stone lanterns (灯籠/灯篭/灯楼; Chinese: dēnglóng; Japanese: tōrō, meaning 'light basket', 'light tower') (Note: 灯篭 is the simplified form of 灯籠.) are a type of traditional East Asian lantern made of stone, wood, or metal. Originating in China, stone lanterns spread to Japan, Korea and Vietnam, though they are most commonly found in both China – extant in Buddhist temples and traditional Chinese gardens – and Japan. In Japan, tōrō were originally used only in Buddhist temples, where they lined and illuminated paths. Lit lanterns were then considered an offering to Buddha. Their use in Shinto shrines and also private homes started during the Heian period (794–1185).

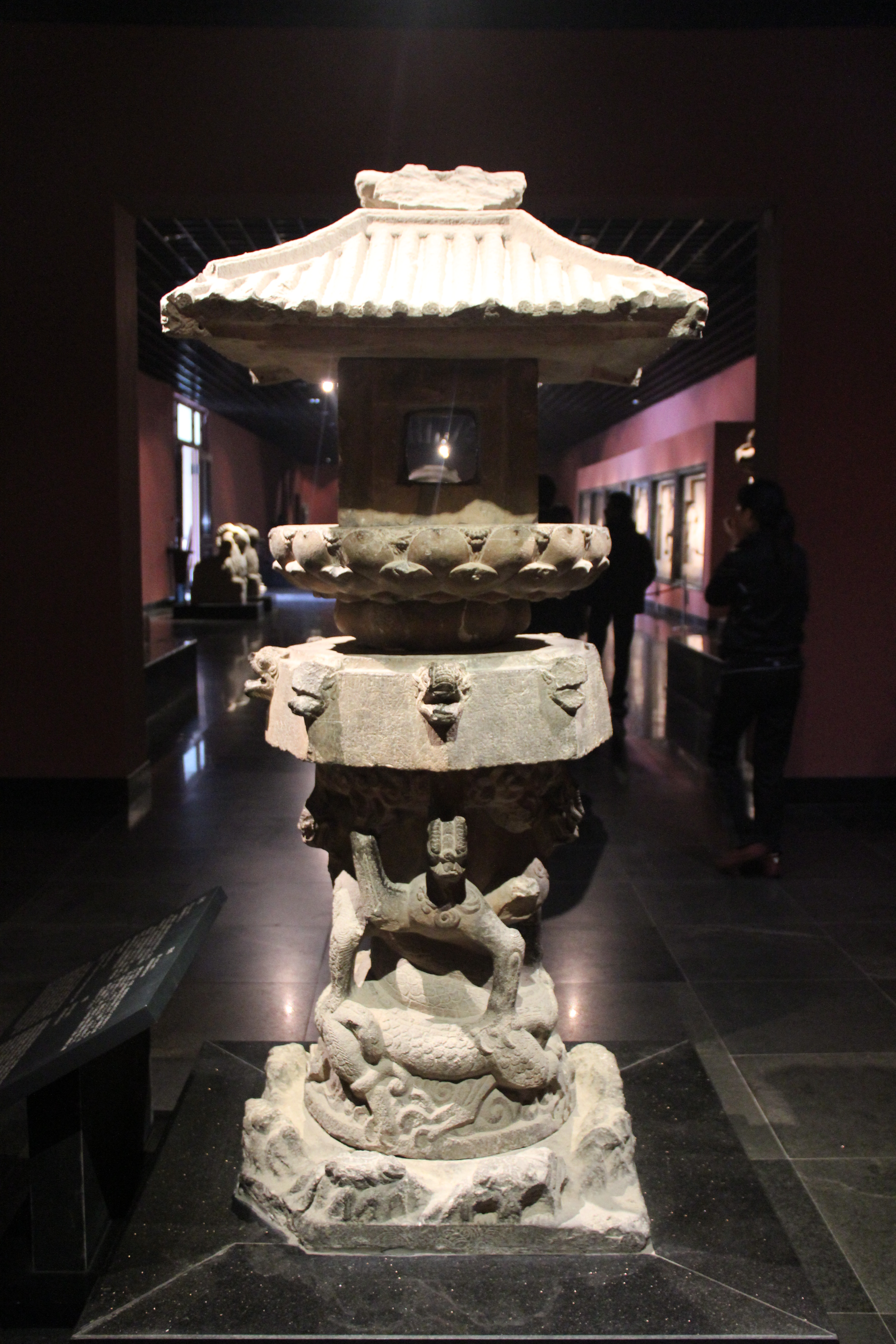
Tang Dynasty stone lantern

Stone lanterns have been known in China as early as the Han dynasty (202 BCE – 220 CE), and prevailed from the Wei, Jin, Southern and Northern Dynasties all the way up to the Tang Dynasty, when they were introduced to Japan. The earliest known extant stone lantern in China is the Northern Qi (550–577) stone lantern in the remains of Tongzi Temple in Taiyuan, Shanxi. Other early stone lanterns which date from the Tang Dynasty (618–907) remain extant in several temples around China, such as the stone lantern in Faxing Temple in Zhangzi, Shanxi which was built in 773.

The oldest extant bronze and stone lanterns in Japan can be found in Nara. Taima-dera has a stone lantern built during the Nara period, while Kasuga-taisha has one of the following Heian period. During the Azuchi-Momoyama period (1568–1600), stone lanterns were popularized by tea masters, who used them as garden ornaments. Soon they started to develop new types according to the need. In modern gardens they have a purely ornamental function and are laid along paths, near water, or next to a building.

Tōrō can be classified in two main types: tsuri-dōrō (釣灯籠/掻灯/吊り灯籠, lit. 'hanging lamp'), which usually hang from the eaves of a roof, and dai-dōrō (台灯籠, lit. 'platform lamp'), used in gardens and along the approach (sandō) of a shrine or temple. The two most common types of dai-dōrō are the bronze lantern and the stone lantern, which look like hanging lanterns laid to rest on a pedestal.

In its complete, original form (some of its elements may be either missing or additions), like the gorintō and the pagoda, the dai-dōrō represents the five elements of Buddhist cosmology. The bottom-most piece, touching the ground, represents chi, the earth; the next section represents sui, or water; ka or fire, is represented by the section encasing the lantern's light or flame, while fū (air) and kū (void or spirit) are represented by the last two sections, top-most and pointing towards the sky. The segments express the idea that after death a person's physical body will go back to their original, elemental form.

== Hanging lanterns ==
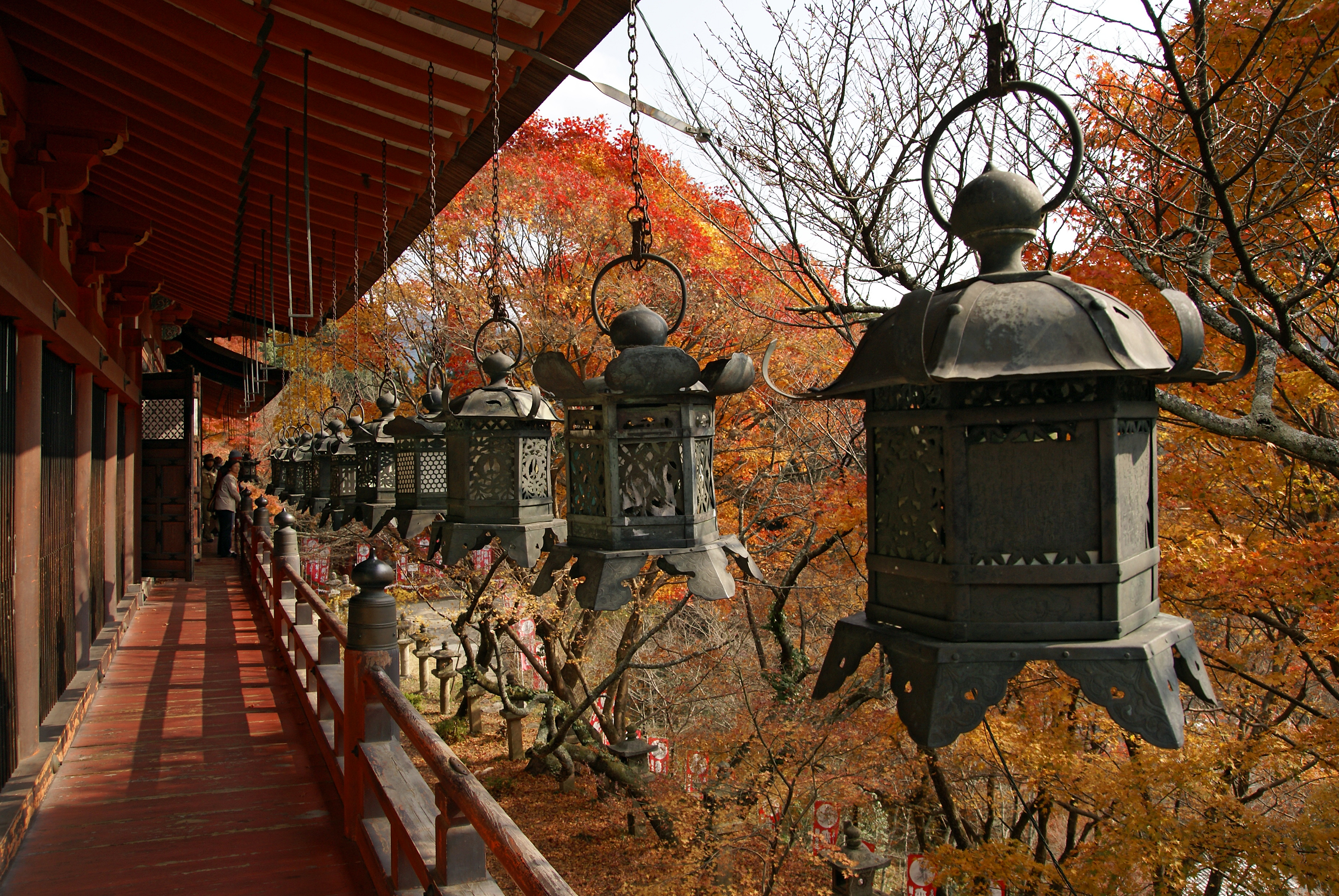
Hanging lanterns (tsuri-dōrō) at Tanzan Shrine

Also called kaitomoshi (掻灯), tsuri-dōrō hanging lanterns are small, four- or six-sided and made in metal or wood. They were introduced from China via Korea during the Nara period and were initially used in Imperial palaces.

== Bronze lanterns ==
Bronze lanterns, or kondō-dōrō (金銅燈籠, gilt bronze lantern) have a long history in Japan, but are not as common or as diverse in form as the stone ones. In their classic form they are divided in sections that represent the five elements of Buddhist cosmology.

Many have been designated as Cultural Properties of Japan by the Japanese government. The one in front of Tōdai-ji's Daibutsuden for example has been declared a National Treasure. Kōfuku-ji has in its museum one built in 816 and which is also a National Treasure.

== Stone lanterns ==
Dai-dōrō (platform lantern) are most often made of stone; in this case, they are referred to as ishi-dōrō (石灯籠, lit. 'stone lantern').

One of the main historic centres of production of stone lanterns is Okazaki, Aichi. The traditional stonemasonry there was registered by the government as a Japanese craft in 1979.

=== Structure ===
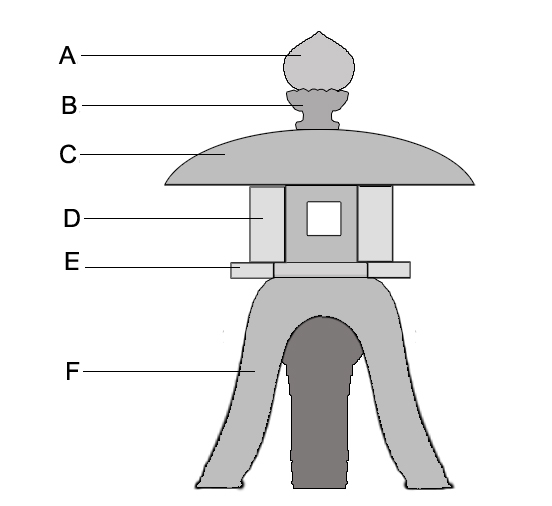
Stone lantern diagram: A. Hōju or hōshu, B. Ukebana, C. Kasa, D. Hibukuro, E. Chūdai, F. Sao

The traditional components of a stone (or bronze) lantern are, from top to bottom:

A. Hōju/hōshu (宝珠, lit. 'jewel')
The onion-shaped part at the very top of the finial.
B. Ukebana (請花)
The lotus-shaped support of the hōju, together symbolizing the element of Kū (空) or sora, translated as aether, space, void or consciousness.
C. Kasa (笠)
A conical or pyramidal umbrella covering the firebox. The corners may curl upwards to form the so-called warabide (蕨手), symbolizing 風 Fū or kaze, the element of wind or air.
D. Hibukuro (火袋, lit. 'fire sack')
The firebox where the fire is lit, symbolizing the element of 火 Ka or hi, meaning "Fire".
E. Chūdai (中台, lit. 'central platform')
The platform for the fire box, symbolizing the element of 水 Sui or mizu, meaning "Water".
F. Sao (竿, lit. 'post')
The post, typically oriented vertically and either circular or square in cross-section, possibly with a corresponding "belt" near its middle; occasionally also formed as a sideways coin or disk, as a set of tall thin lotus petals, or as between one and four arched legs (in "snow-viewing" lanterns); absent in hanging lanterns.
Kiso (基礎, lit. 'foundation')
The base, usually rounded or hexagonal, and absent in a buried lantern (see below).
Kidan (基壇, lit. 'base platform')
A variously-shaped slab of rock sometimes present under the base; together the post, base and platform symbolize the element of 地 Chi (sometimes ji) or tsuchi, meaning "Earth".

The lantern's structure is meant to symbolize the five elements of Buddhist cosmology. With the sole exception of the fire box, any parts may be absent. For example, an oki-dōrō, or movable lantern (see below) lacks a post, and rests directly on the ground. It also may lack an umbrella.

=== Types ===
Stone lanterns can be classified into five basic groups, each possessing numerous variants.

==== Pedestal lanterns ====
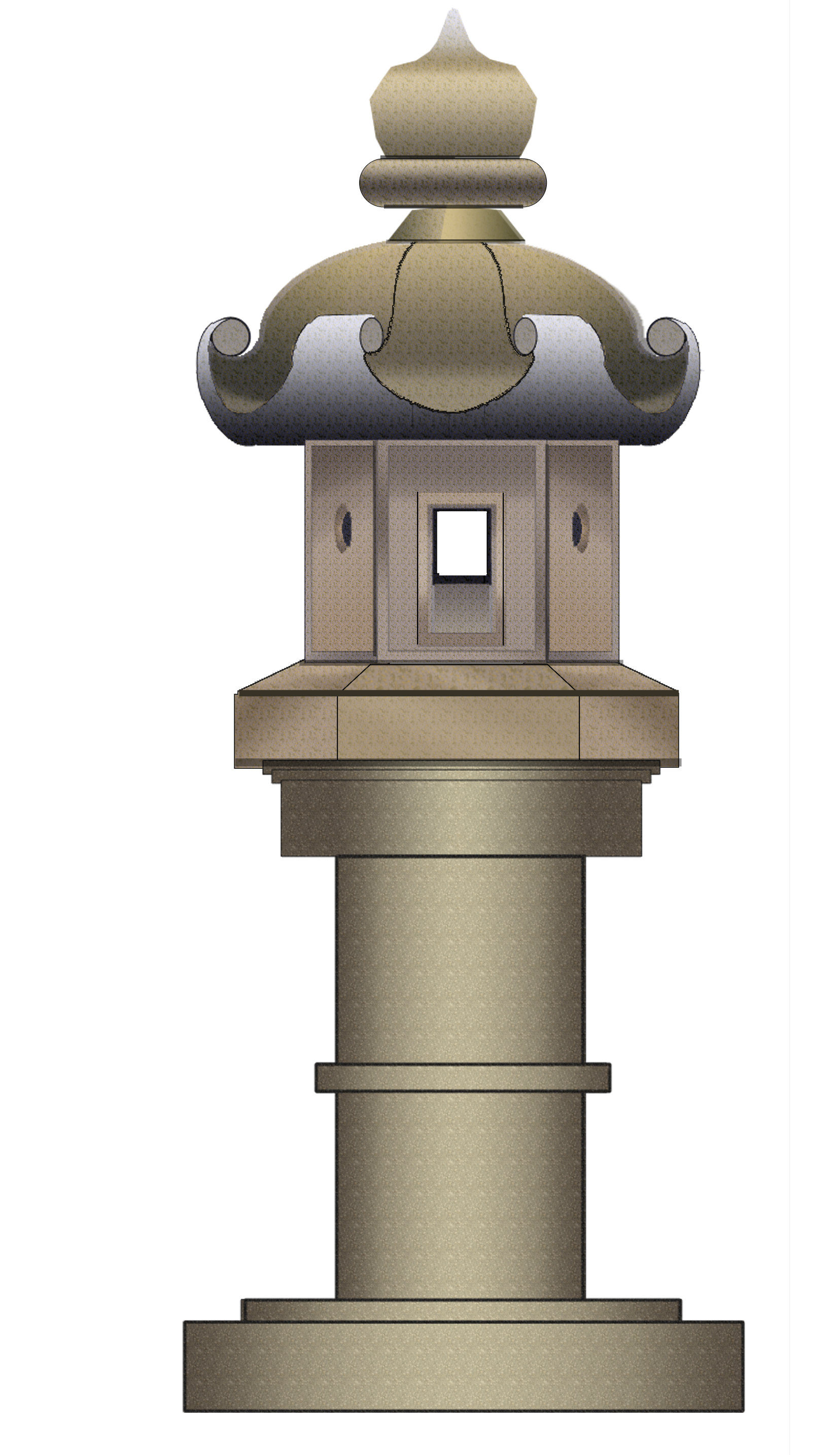
Kasuga-dōrō garden lantern

Tachidōrō (立ち灯籠), or pedestal lanterns, are the most common. The base is always present and the fire box is decorated with carvings of deer, peonies or other figures. More than 20 subtypes exist. The following are among the most common:

Kasuga-dōrō (春日灯籠)
Named after Kasuga-taisha, it is very common at both temples and shrines. The umbrella is small and has either six or eight sides with warabite at the corners. The fire box is either hexagonal or square with carvings representing deer, the sun or moon, or other designs. Tall and thin, it is often found near the second torii of a shrine.
Yūnoki-dōrō (柚ノ木灯篭)
The second oldest stone lantern in Japan, found at Kasuga Shrine, is a yūnoki-dōrō or citron tree stone lantern. This style goes back to at least as the Heian period. The post has rings carved at the bottom, middle and top, and the hexagonal base and middle platform may be carved with lotuses or other auspicious motifs. The umbrella is simple and has neither warabite nor an ukebana. The yūnoki seems to stem from a citron tree that used to stand near the lantern at Kasuga Shrine. This type of lantern became popular in tea house gardens during the Edo period.

==== Buried lanterns ====
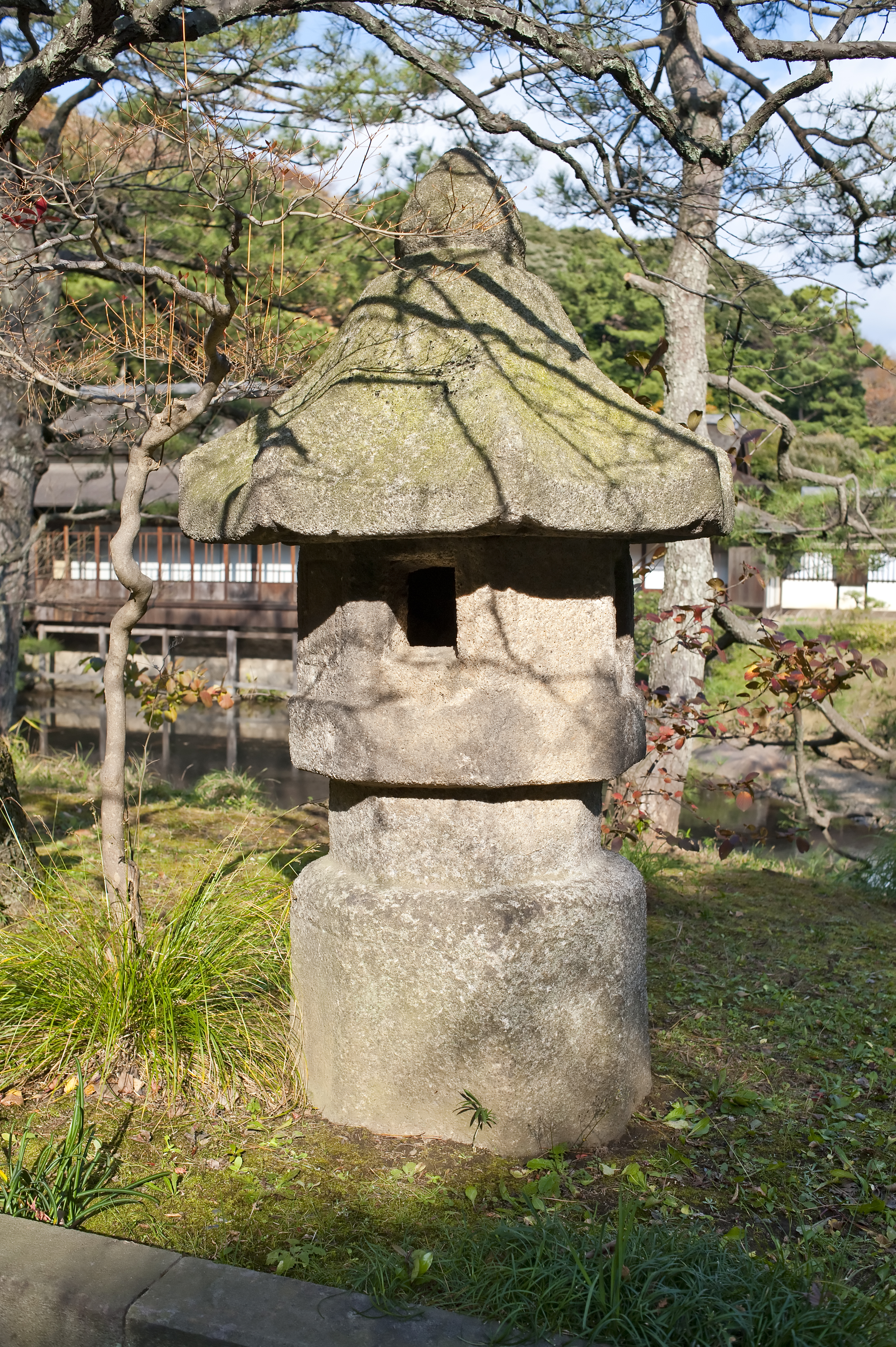
An ikekomi-dōrō

Ikekomi-dōrō (活け込み燈籠), or buried lanterns, are moderately sized lanterns whose post does not rest on a base, but goes directly into the ground. Because of their modest size, they are used along paths or at stone basins in gardens. The following are some examples:

Oribe-dōrō (織部灯籠)
This common type is named after Furuta Shigenari, a nobleman popularly known as Oribe, who designed it to be used in gardens. The fire box is a cube with a window on each side: the front and rear are square, the right and left are shaped as a crescent moon and the full moon respectively. The umbrella is small and four-sided.
Kirishitan-dōrō (キリシタン灯籠)
This is simply an oribe-dōrō with hidden Christian symbols. This style was born during the persecution of the Christian religion in Japan, when many continued to practice their faith in secret. (Note: For details, see the article Kakure Kirishitan.)
Mizubotaru-dōrō (水蛍燈籠, Mizubotaru-dōrō)
A typical ikekomi-dōrō, its fire box has square openings on two facing sides and double-triangle openings on the other two. This type of lantern is used at the Katsura Villa in Kyoto. The roof is square and rounded.

==== Movable lanterns ====
Oki-dōrō (置き燈籠), or movable lanterns, owe their name to the fact that they just rest on the ground, and are not fixed in any way. This type probably derived from hanging lanterns, which they often strongly resemble, left to rest on the ground. They are commonly used around house entrances and along paths.

One example of a movable lantern would be the zankō-dōrō (三光灯籠, lit. 'three lights lantern'), a small stone box with a low roof. Its name, "three lights lantern", is due to its windows, shaped like the sun and the moon in the front and rear, and like a star at the ends. This type of lantern is usually placed near water. It can be found in the garden of the Katsura Villa.

==== Legged lanterns ====
Yukimi-dōrō (雪見燈籠), or legged lanterns, have as a base not a post but from one to six curved legs, and a wide umbrella with a finial either low or absent. Relatively low, they are used exclusively in gardens. The traditional placement is near the water, and a three-legged lantern will often have two legs in the water, and one on land. The umbrella can be round or have from three to eight sides, while the fire box is usually hexagonal.

Legged lanterns were probably developed during the Momoyama period, but the oldest extant examples, found at the Katsura Villa in Kyoto, go back only to the early Edo period.

==== Nozura-dōrō ====
Nozura-dōrō (野面灯籠) are lanterns made with rough, unpolished stones.

== Gallery ==
=== Hanging metal lanterns ===
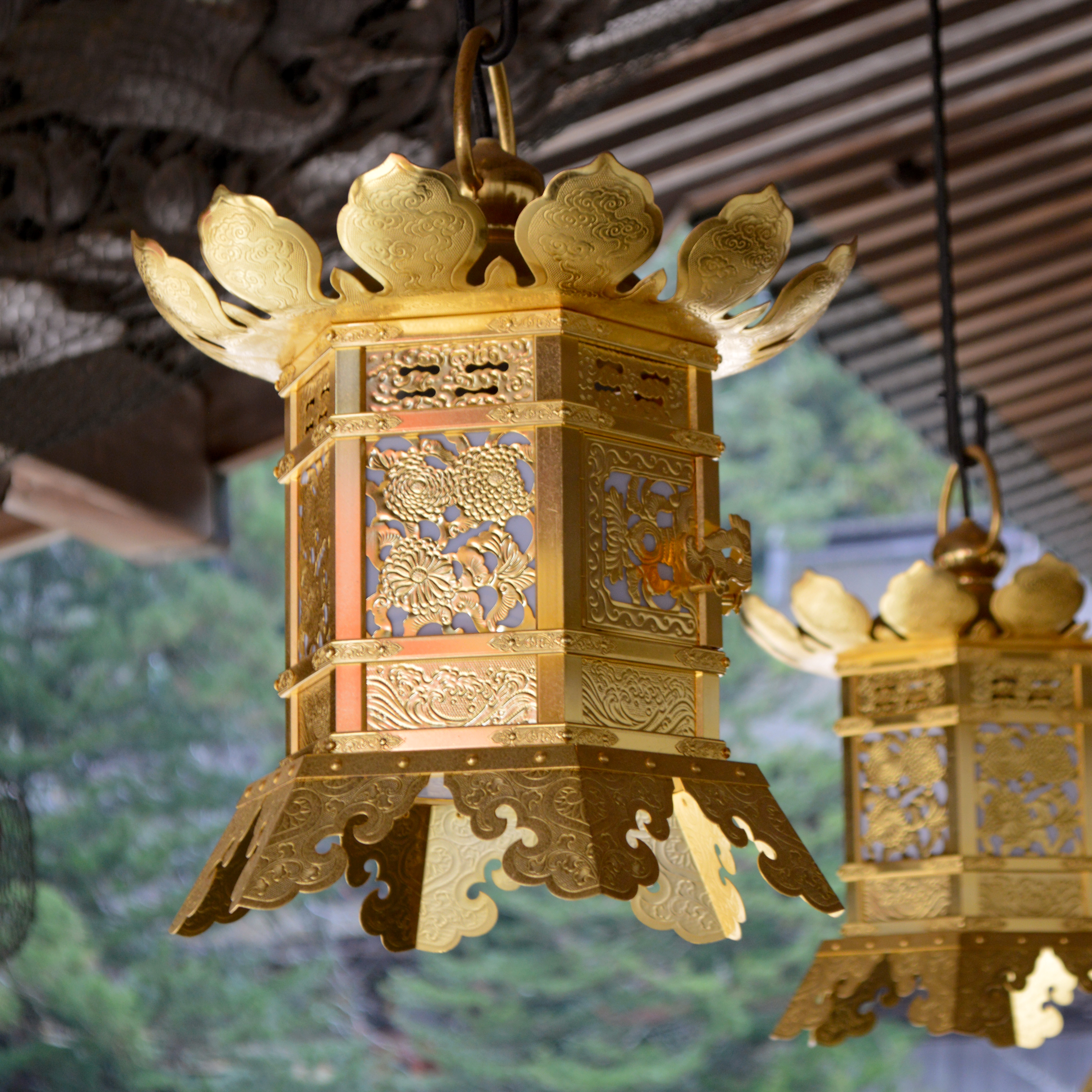
A votive hanging lantern

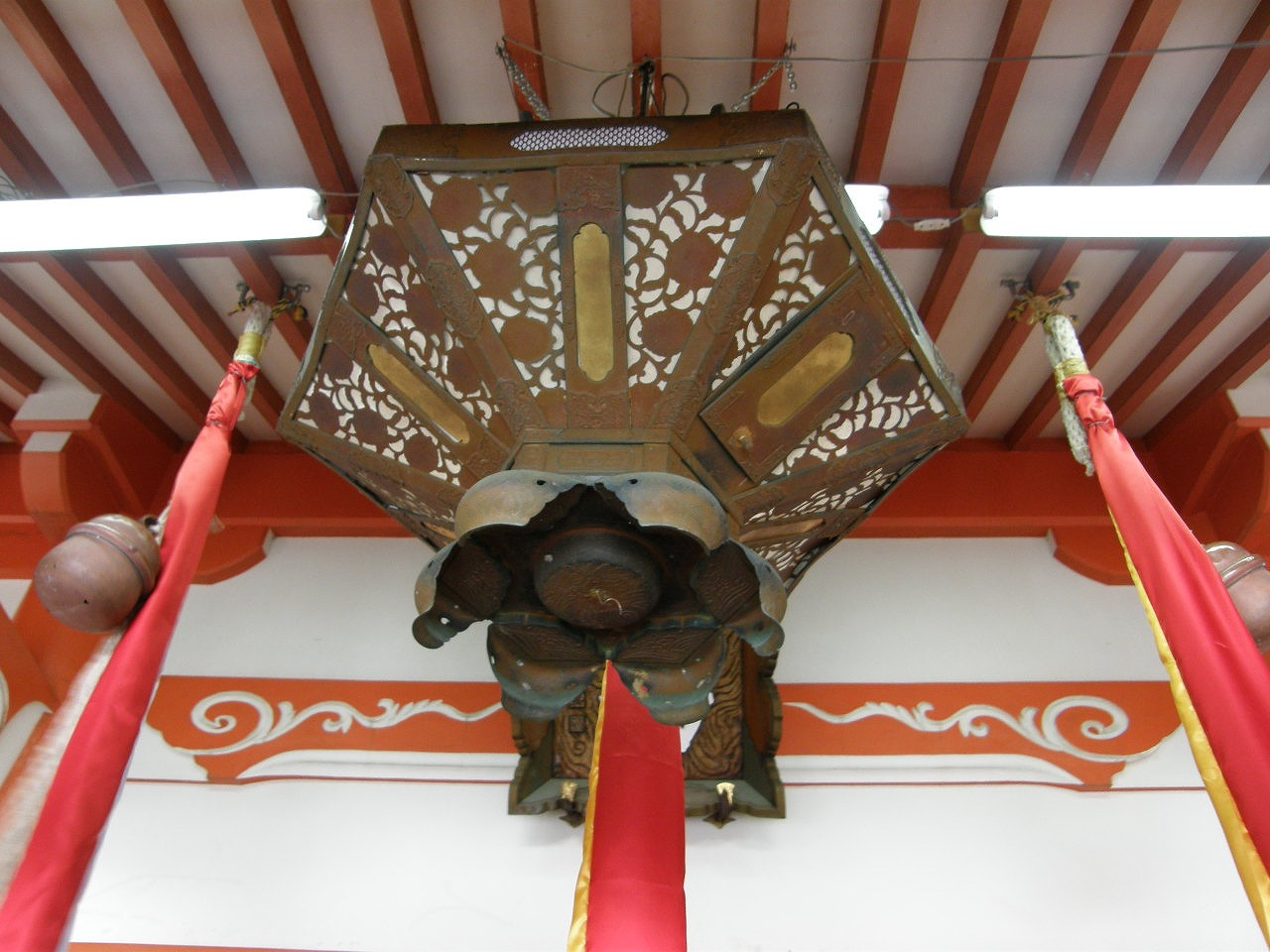
A hexagonal hanging lantern

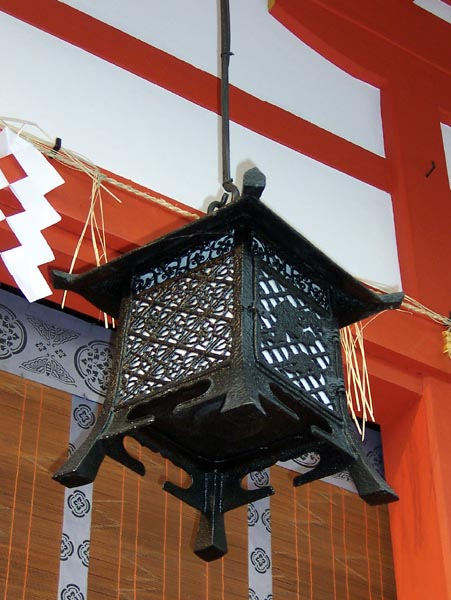
Hanging lantern at Fushimi Inari Shrine

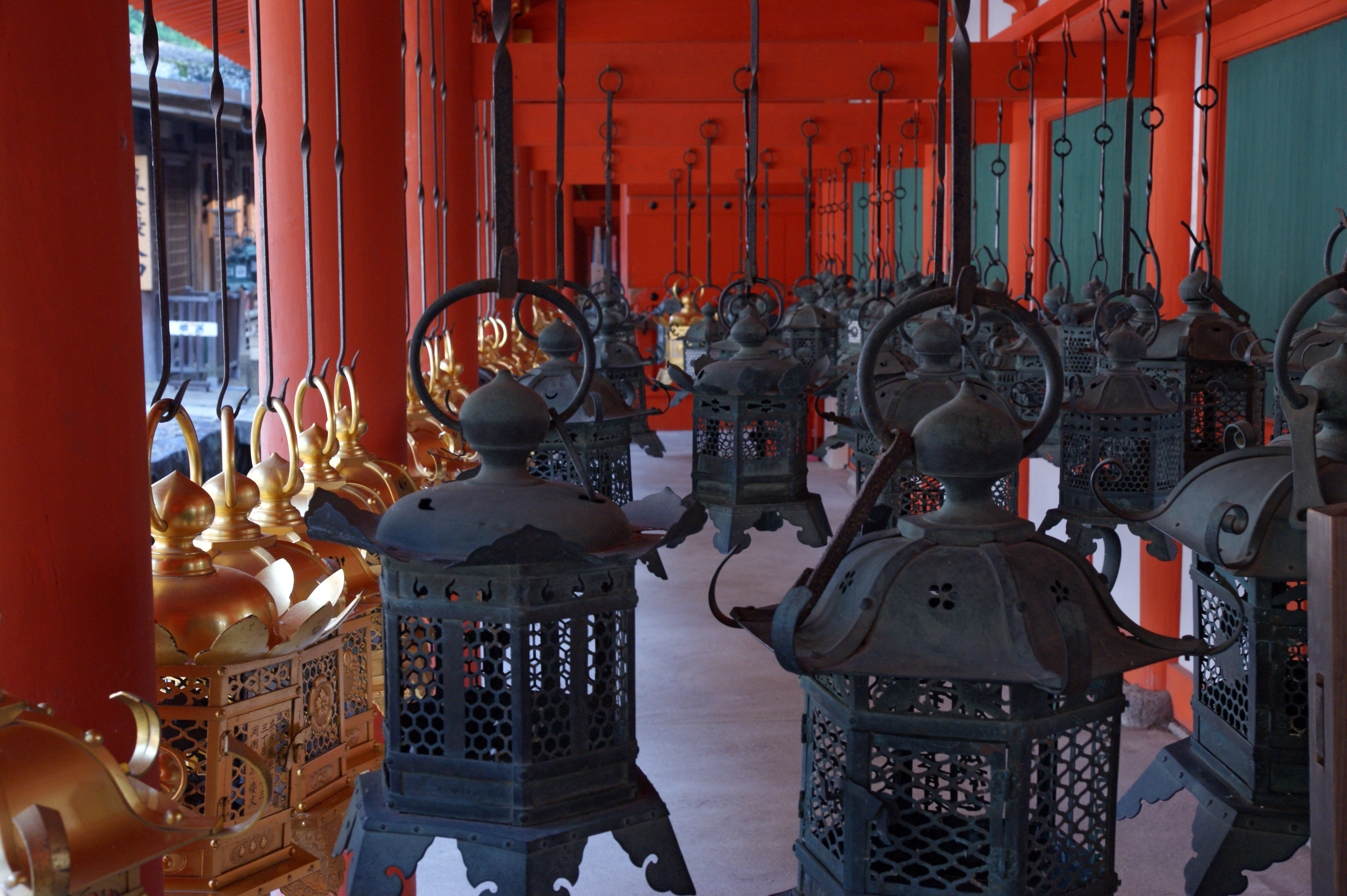
Hanging lanterns lit at Kasuga-taisha

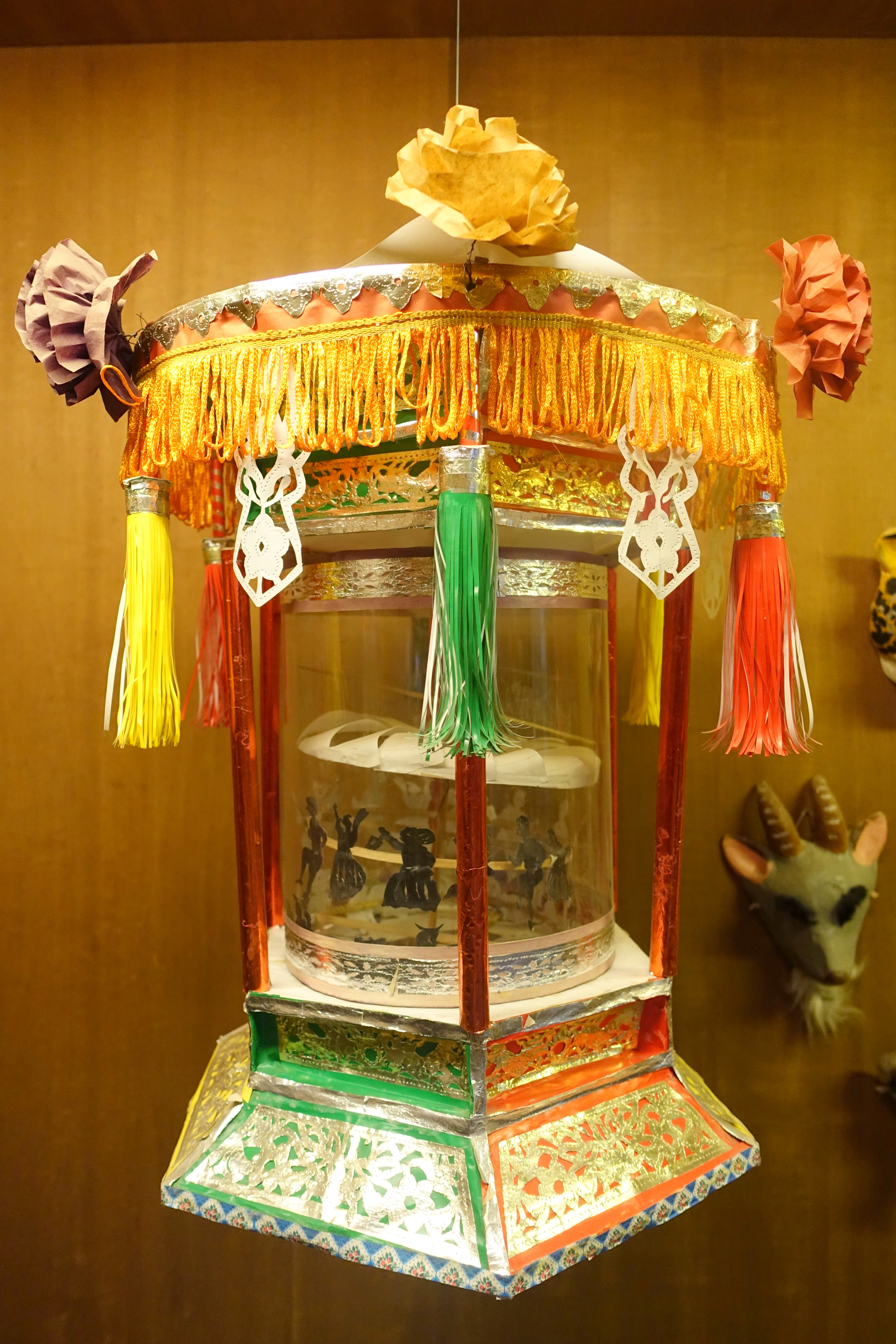
Exhibit in the Vietnam Museum of Ethnology - Hanoi, Vietnam

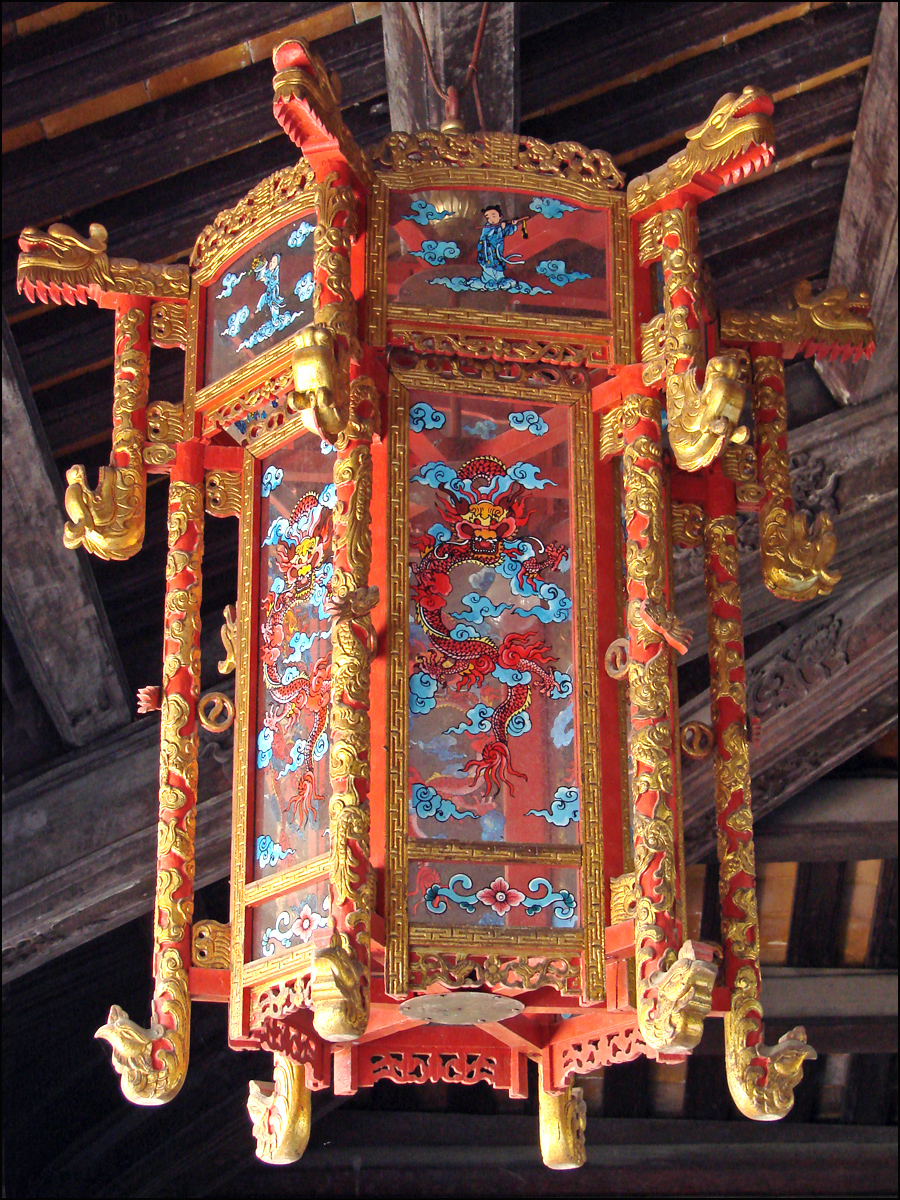
Hanging lantern at Imperial City of Huế

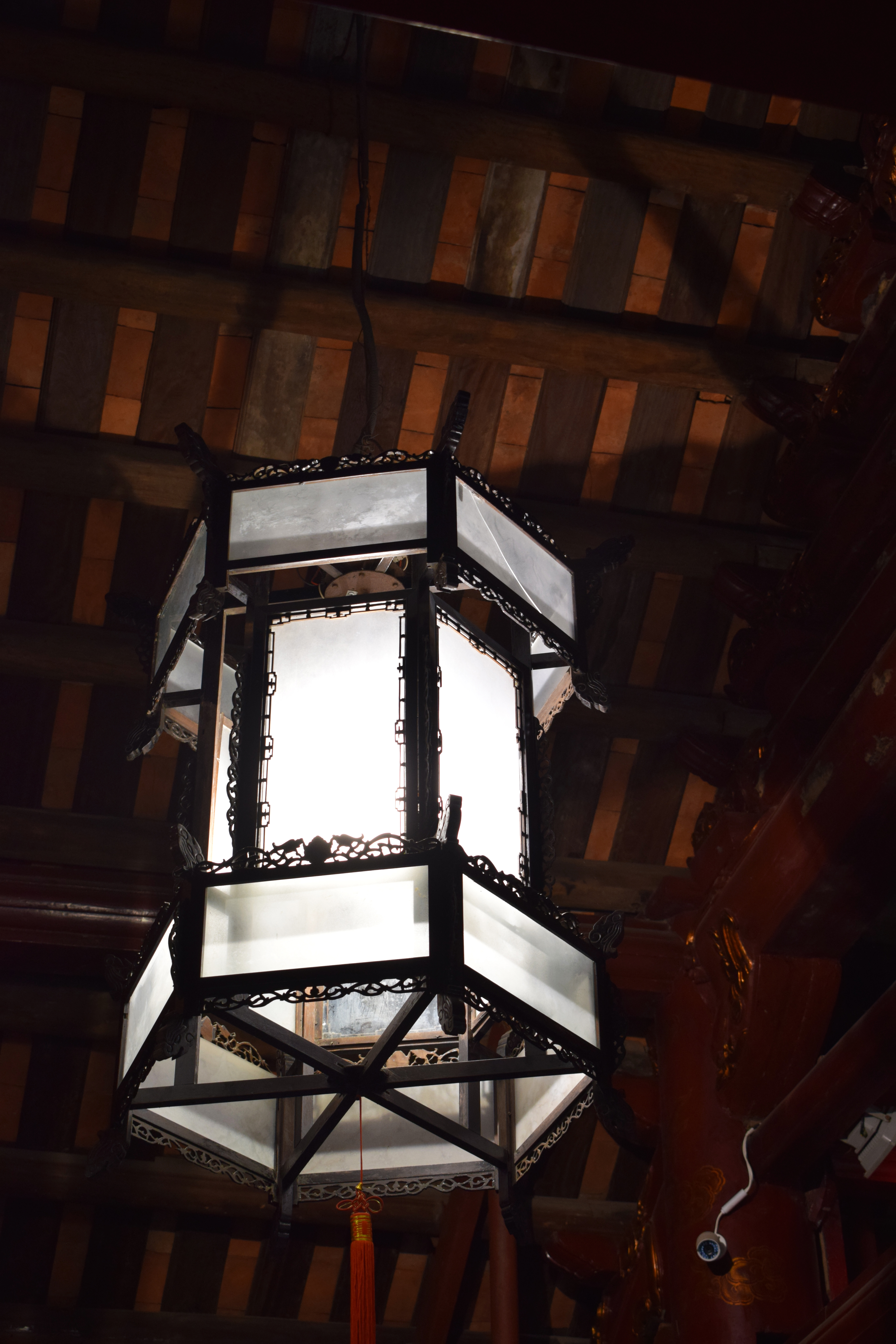
Hanging lantern at Temple of Literature, Hanoi

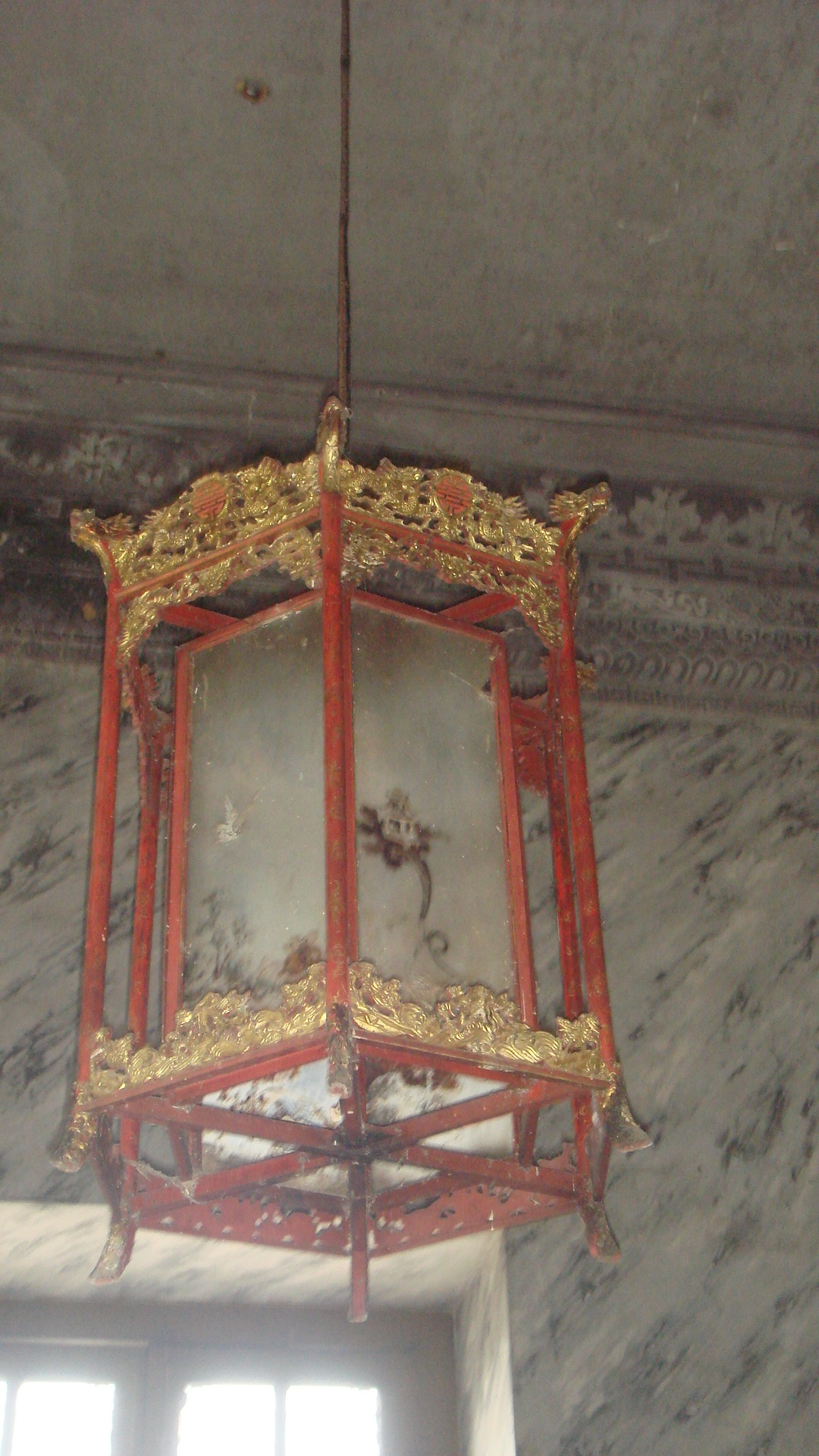
Hanging lanterns in Huế

=== Bronze lanterns ===
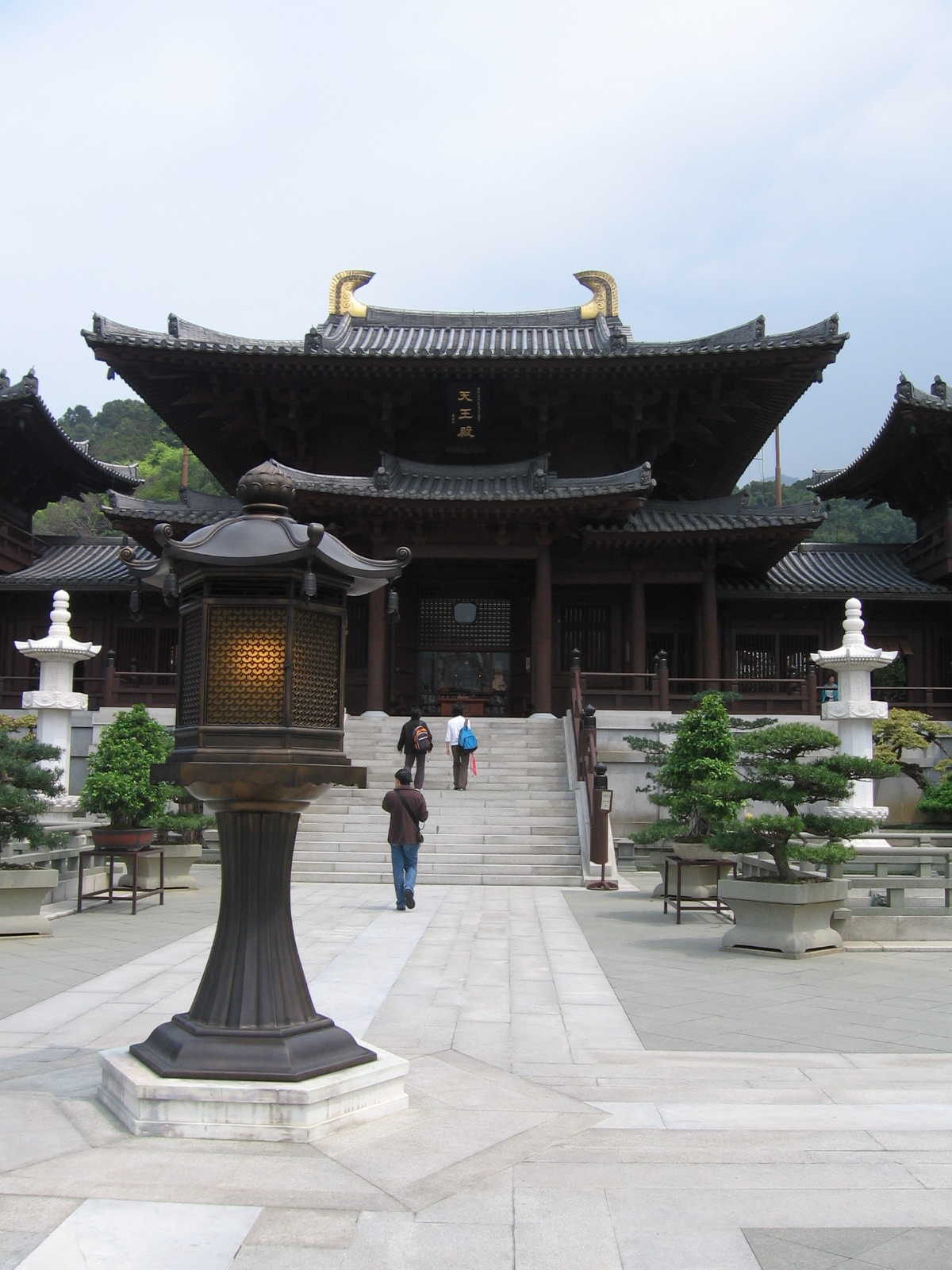
Bronze and stone lanterns in Chi Lin Nunnery, Hongkong

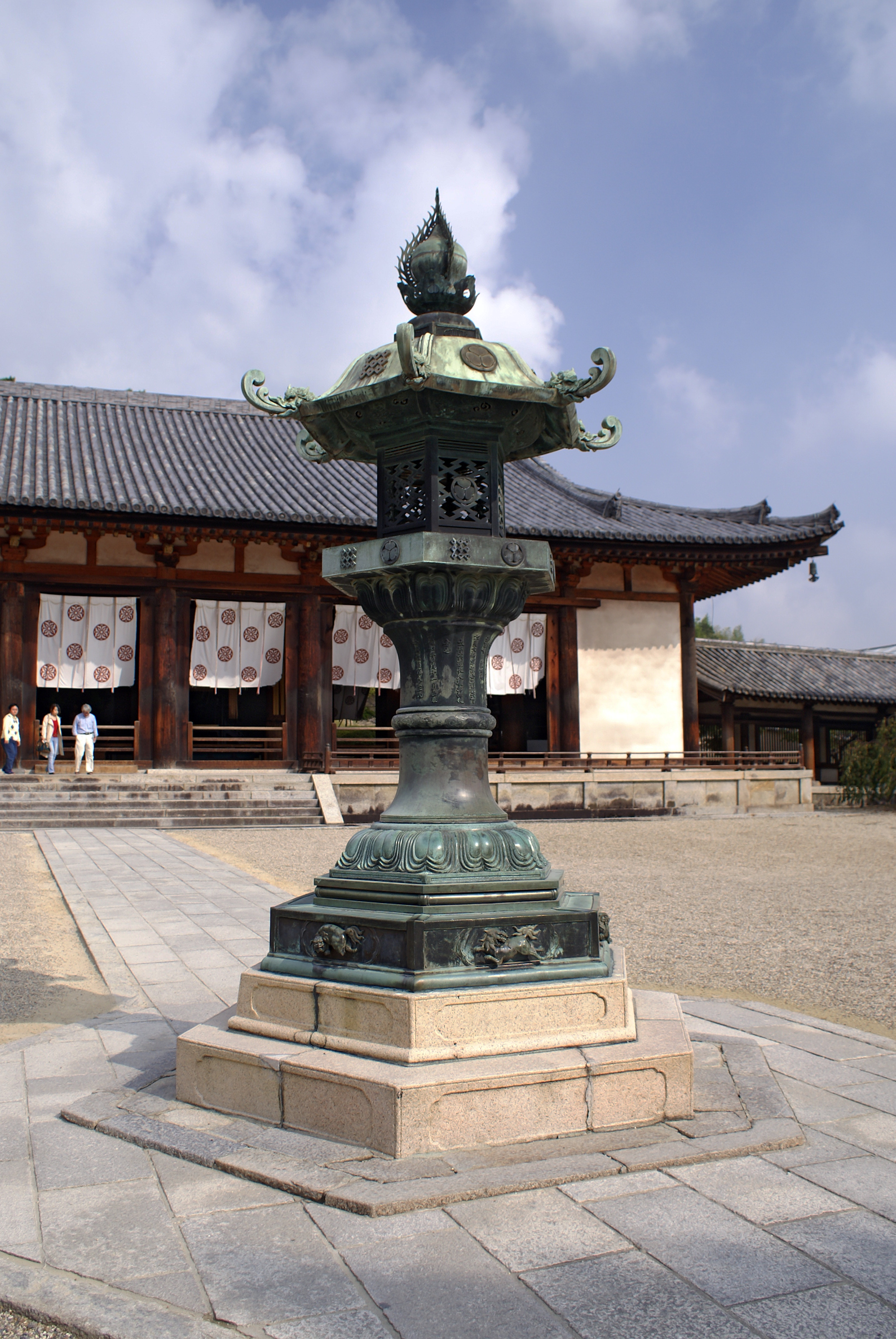
Bronze lantern at Hōryū-ji

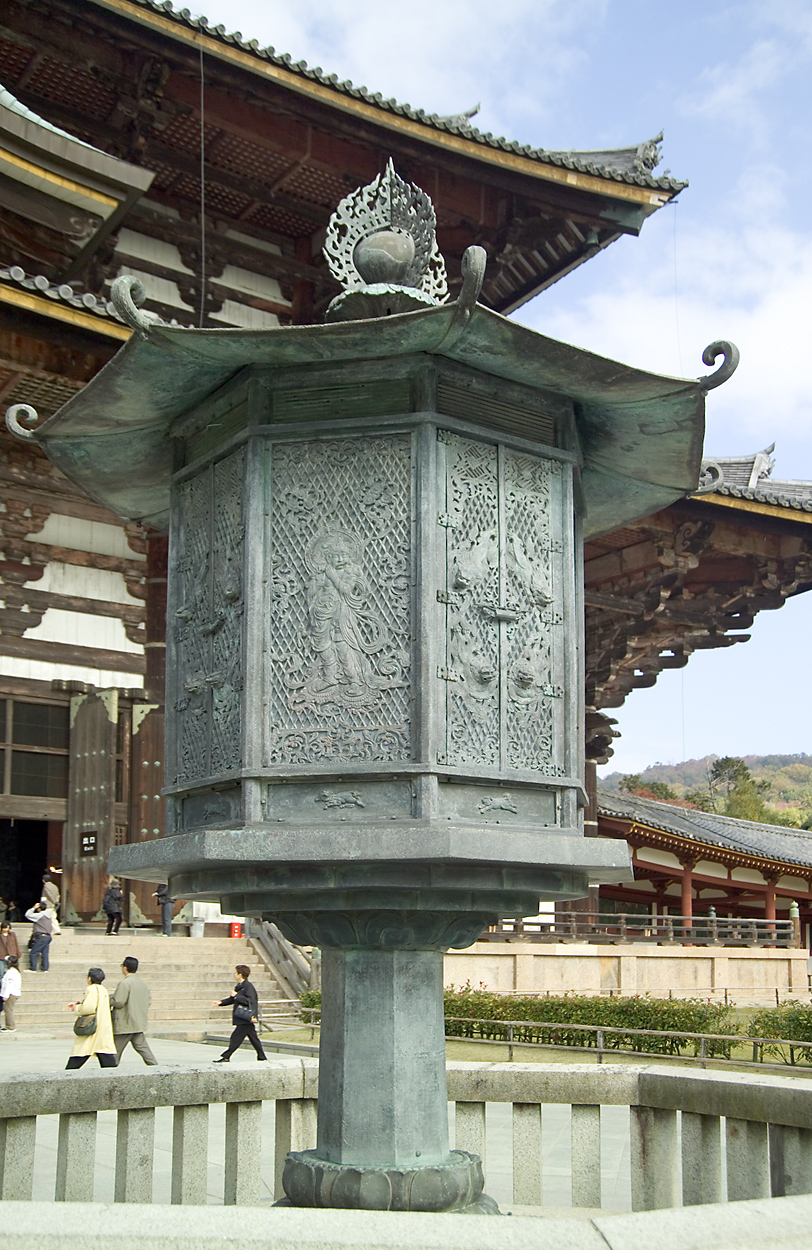
8th century bronze lantern at Tōdai-ji (National Treasure)

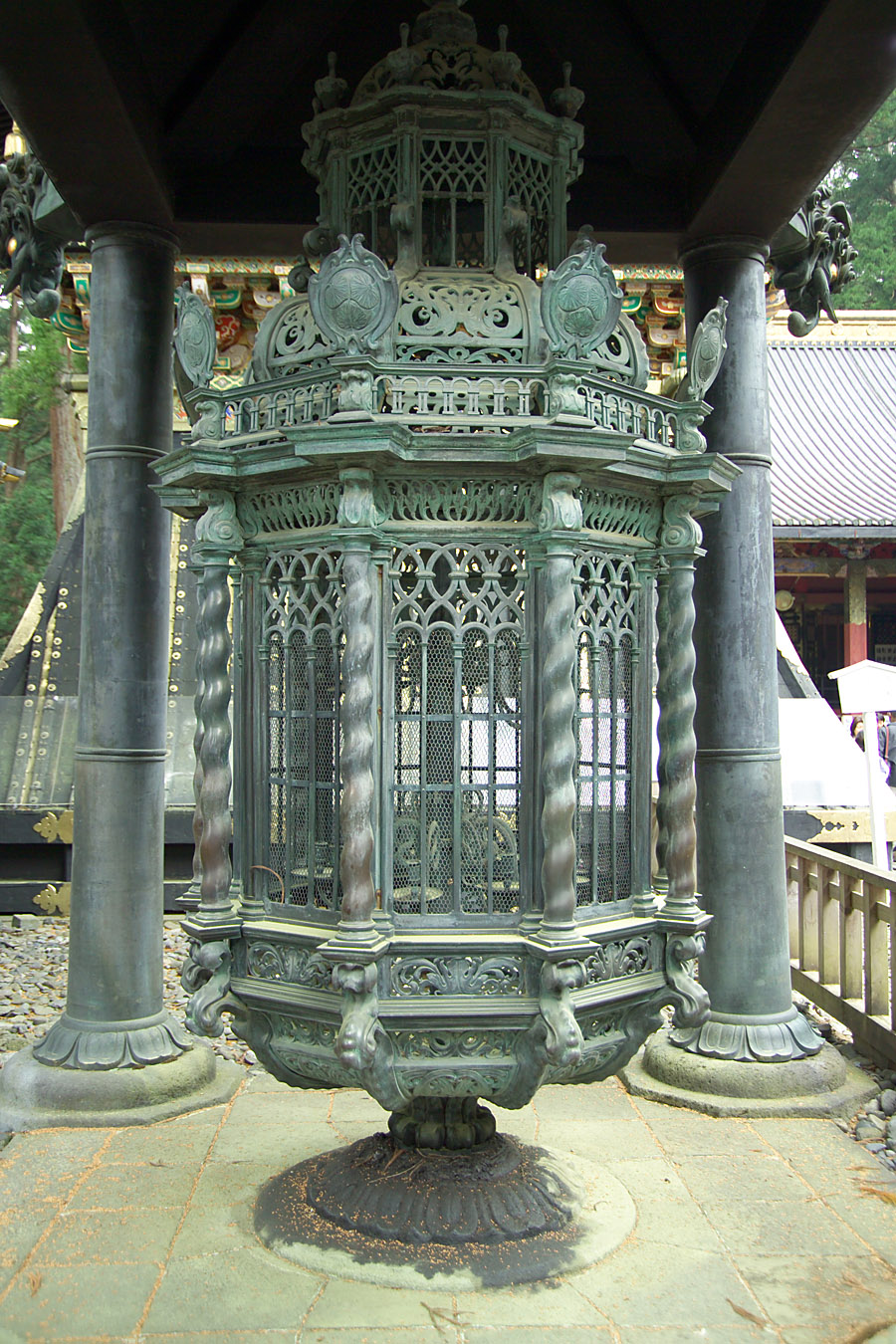
Bronze lantern at Nikkō Tōshō-gū

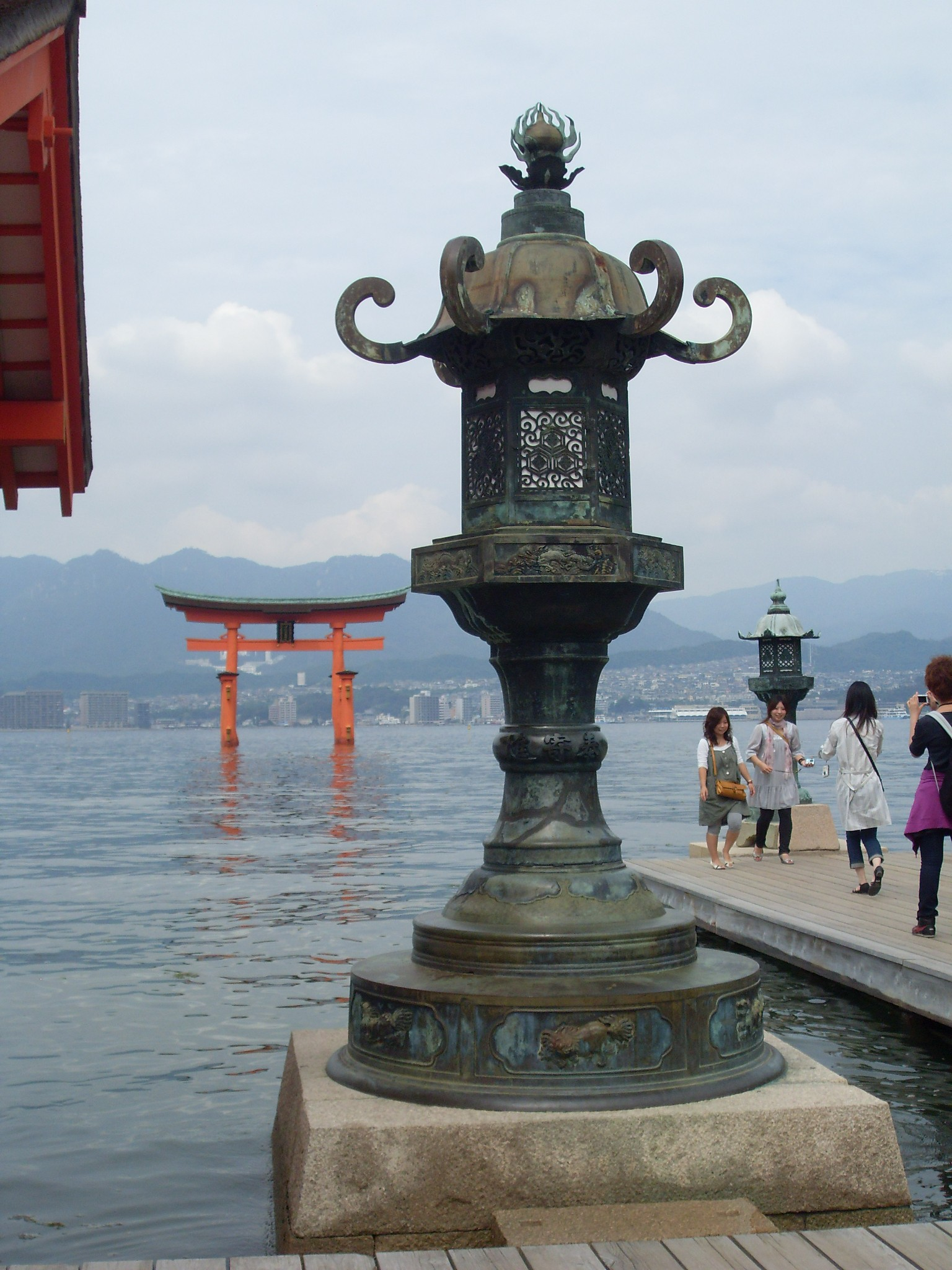
Bronze lantern at Itsukushima Shrine

=== Stone lanterns ===
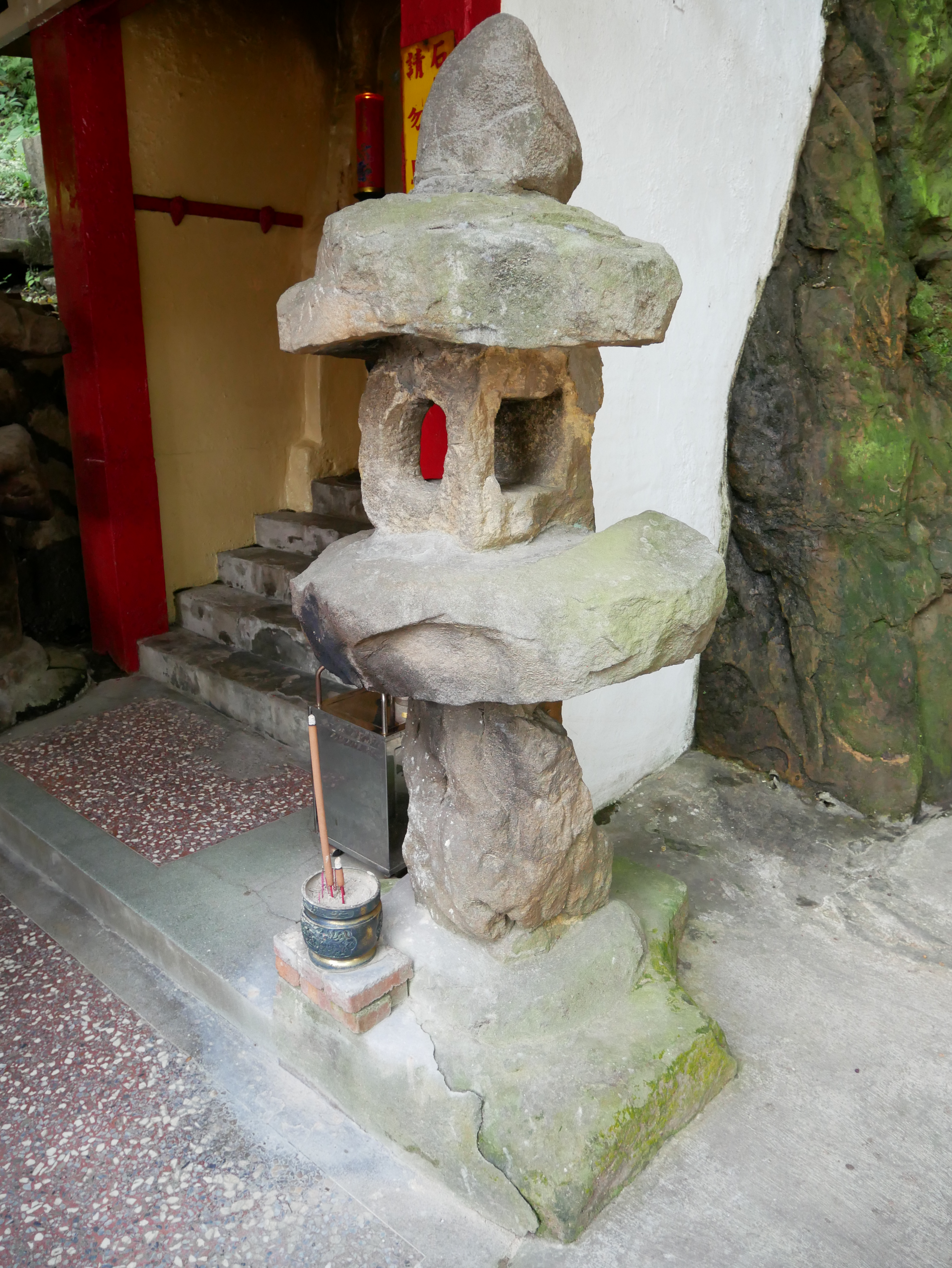
Stone lantern in Taiwan

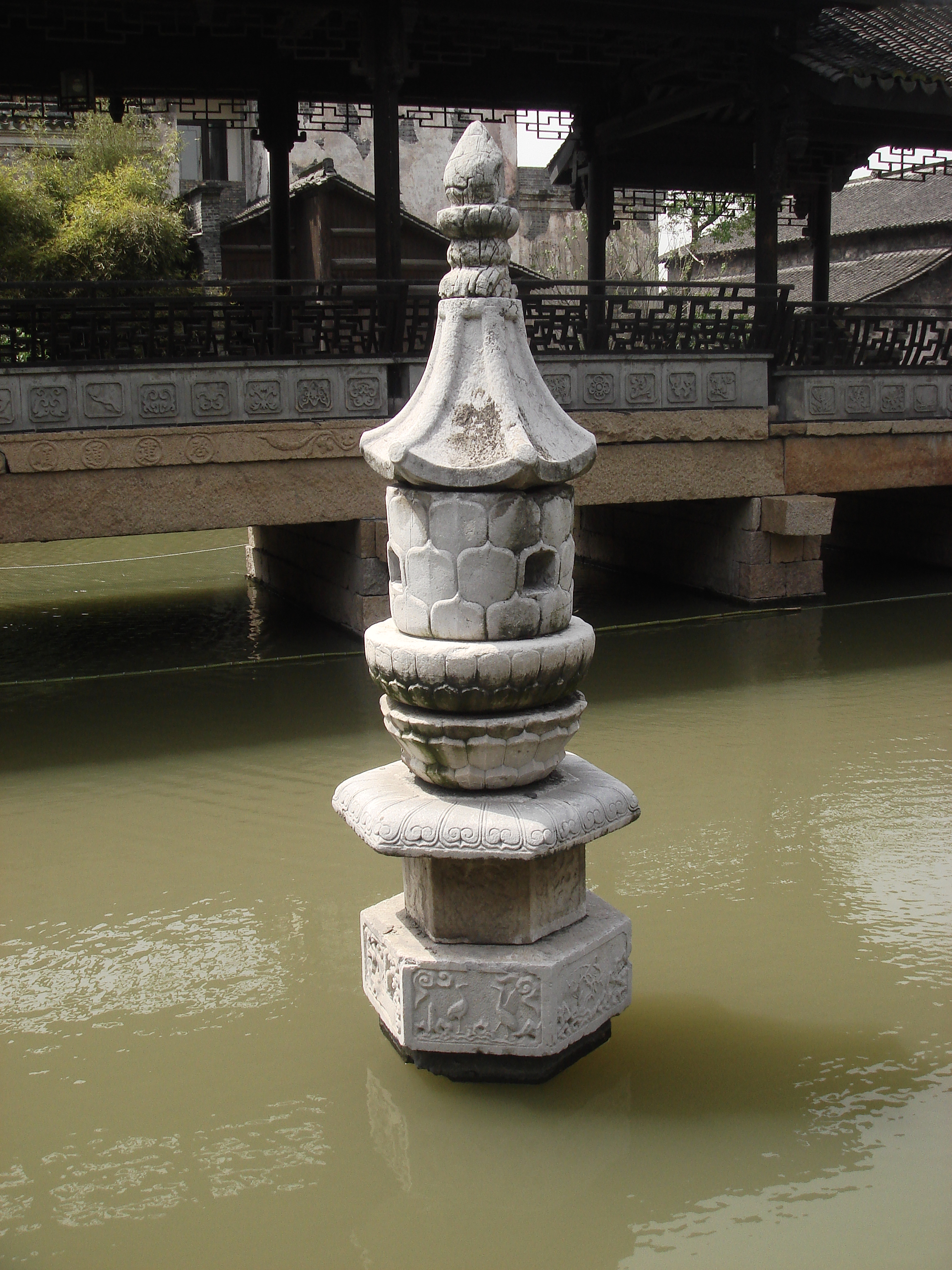
Water lantern in Zhejiang Province

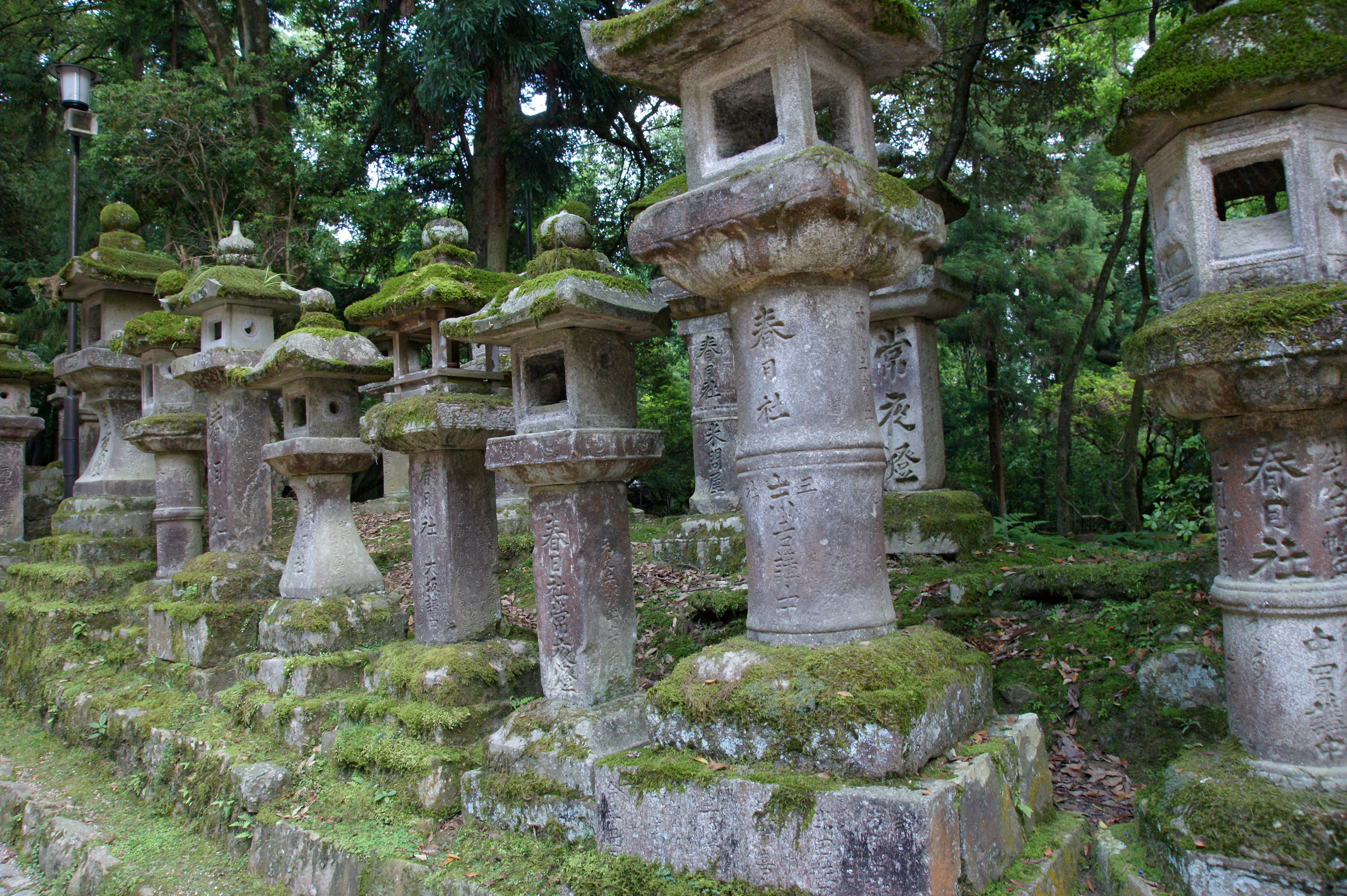
Tachi-dōrō of the kasuga-dōrō type

360° rotation around a stone lantern at a local Shinto shrine in Kanagawa Prefecture

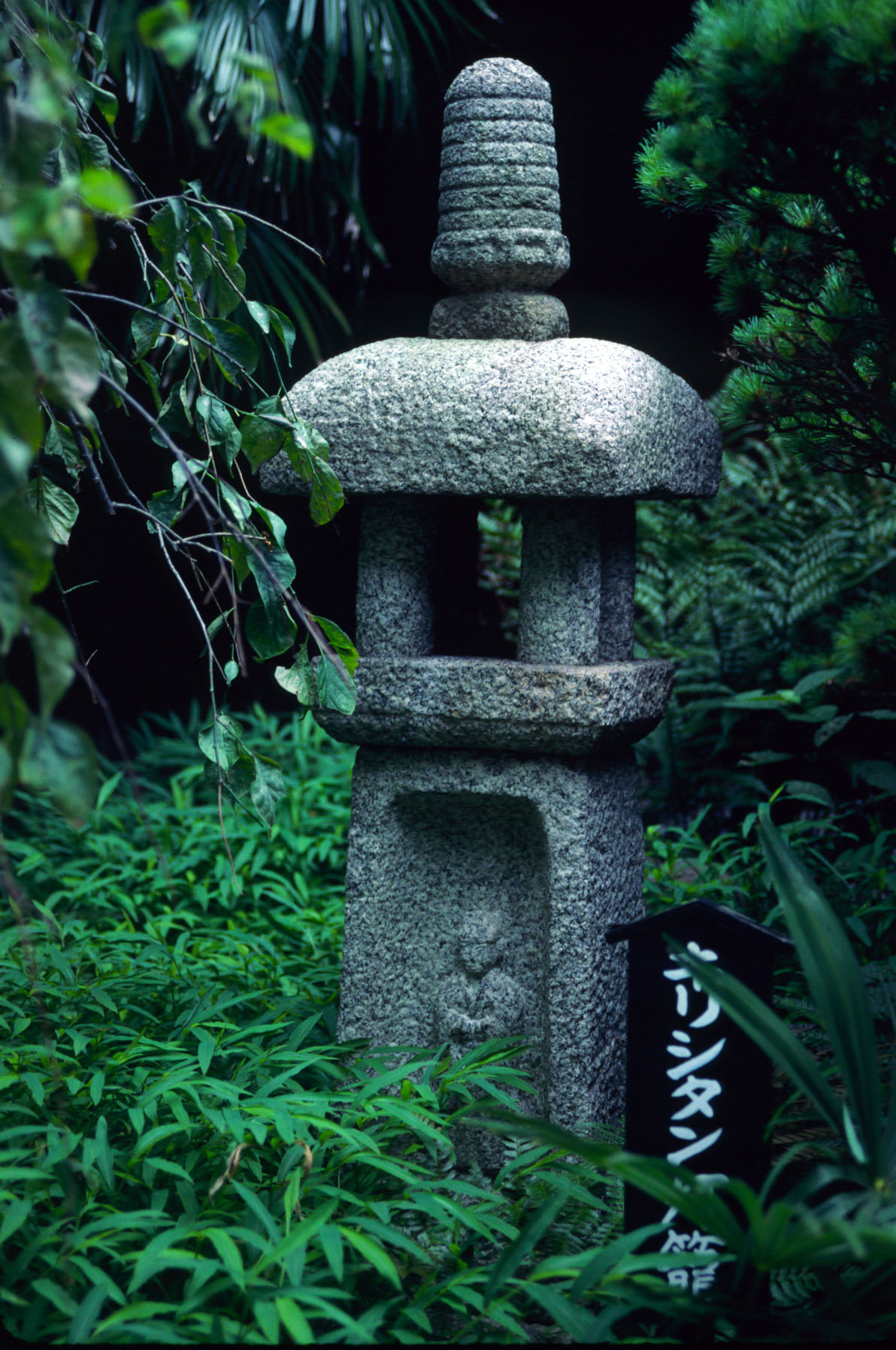
A kirishitan-dōrō

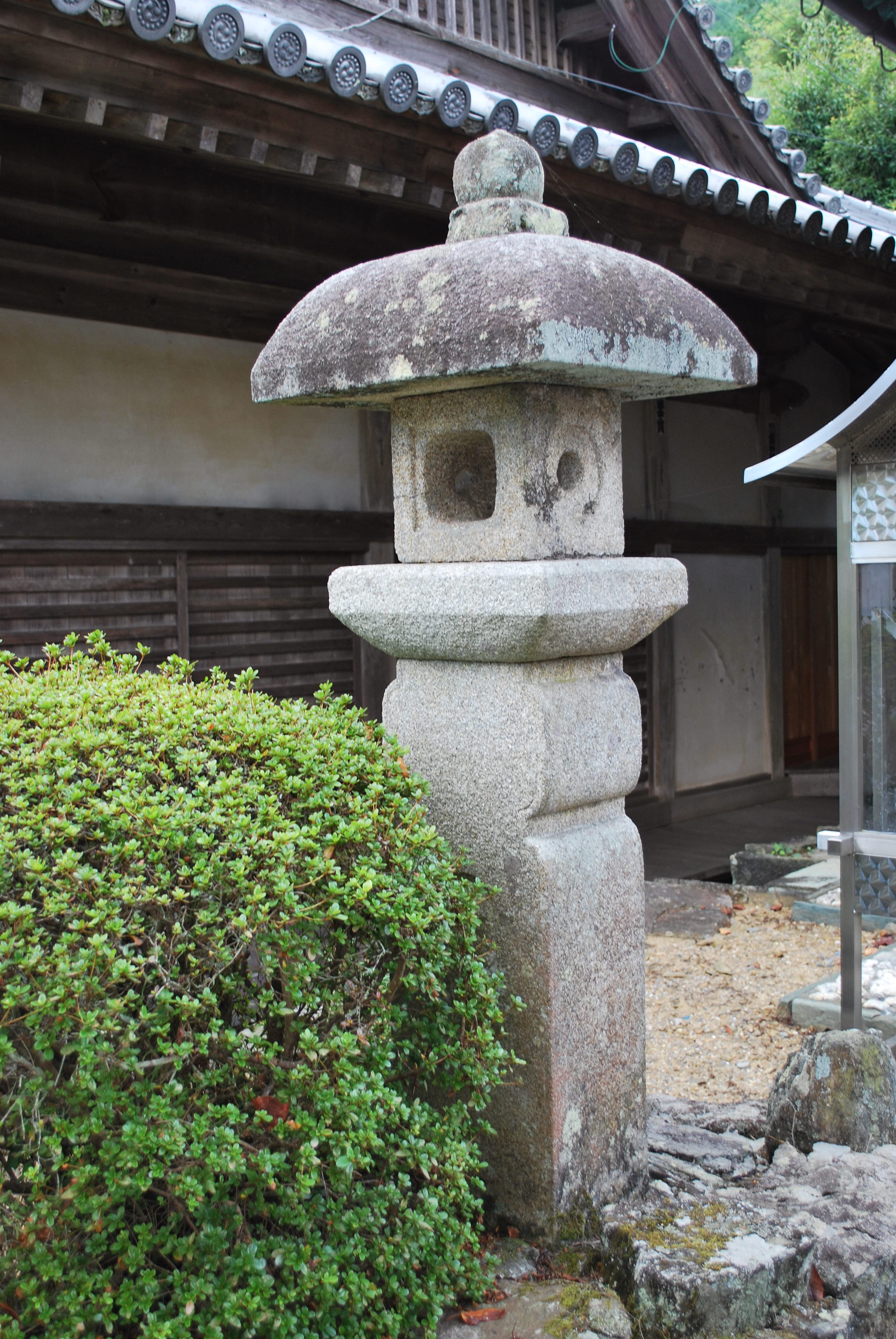
Ikekomi-dōrō of the Kirishitan-dōrō type

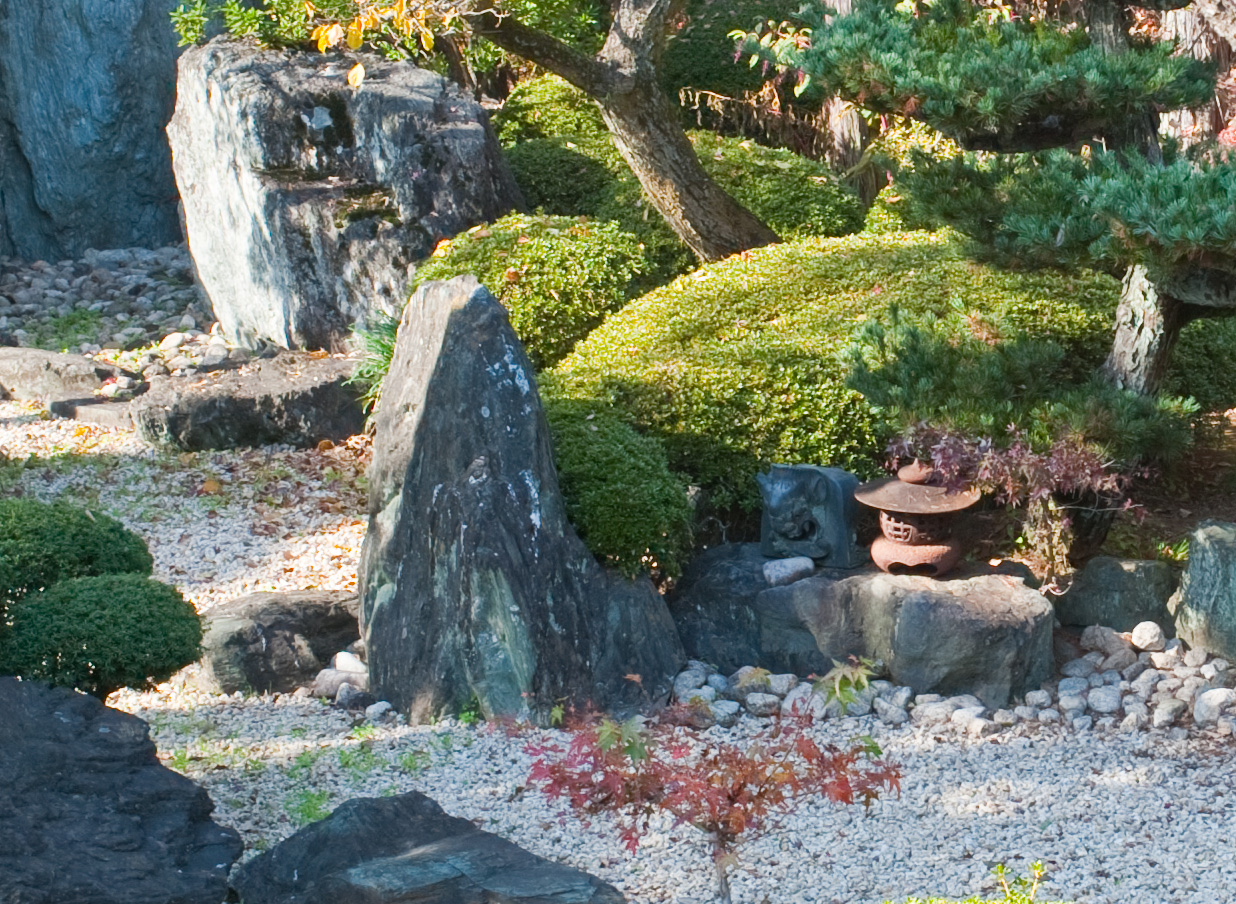
An oki-dōrō

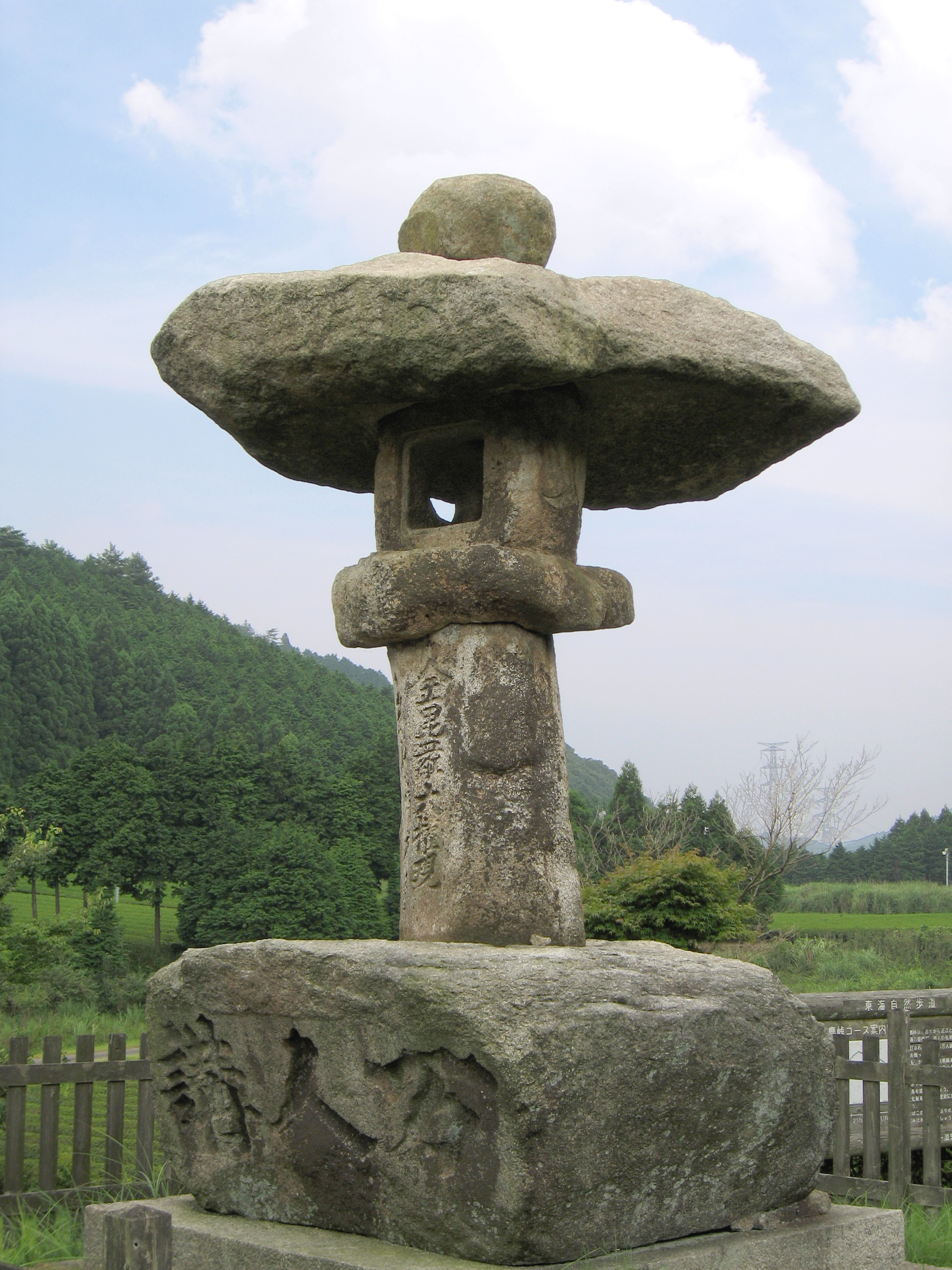
A nozura-dōrō

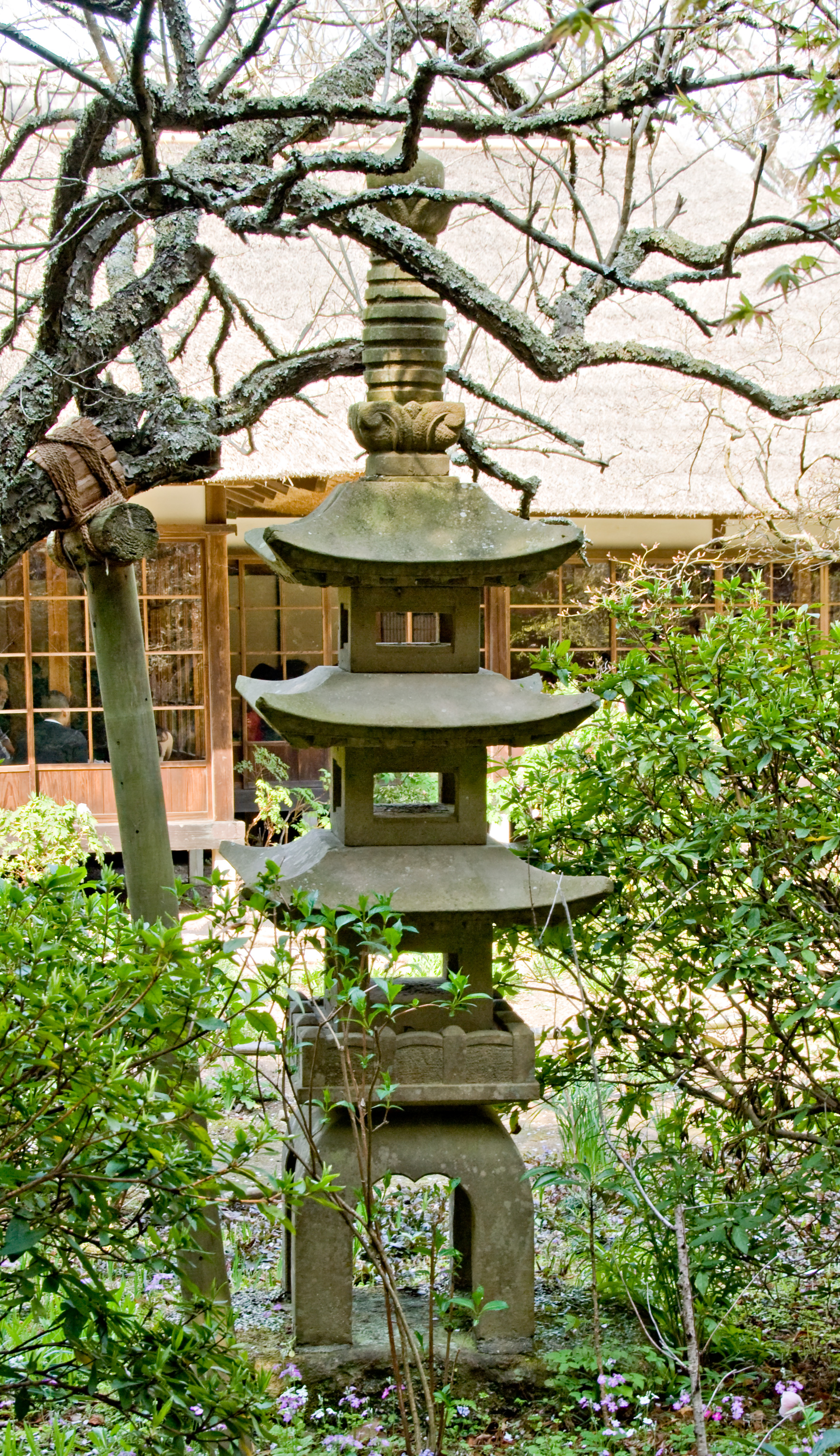
Pagoda-shaped lantern at Jōchi-ji

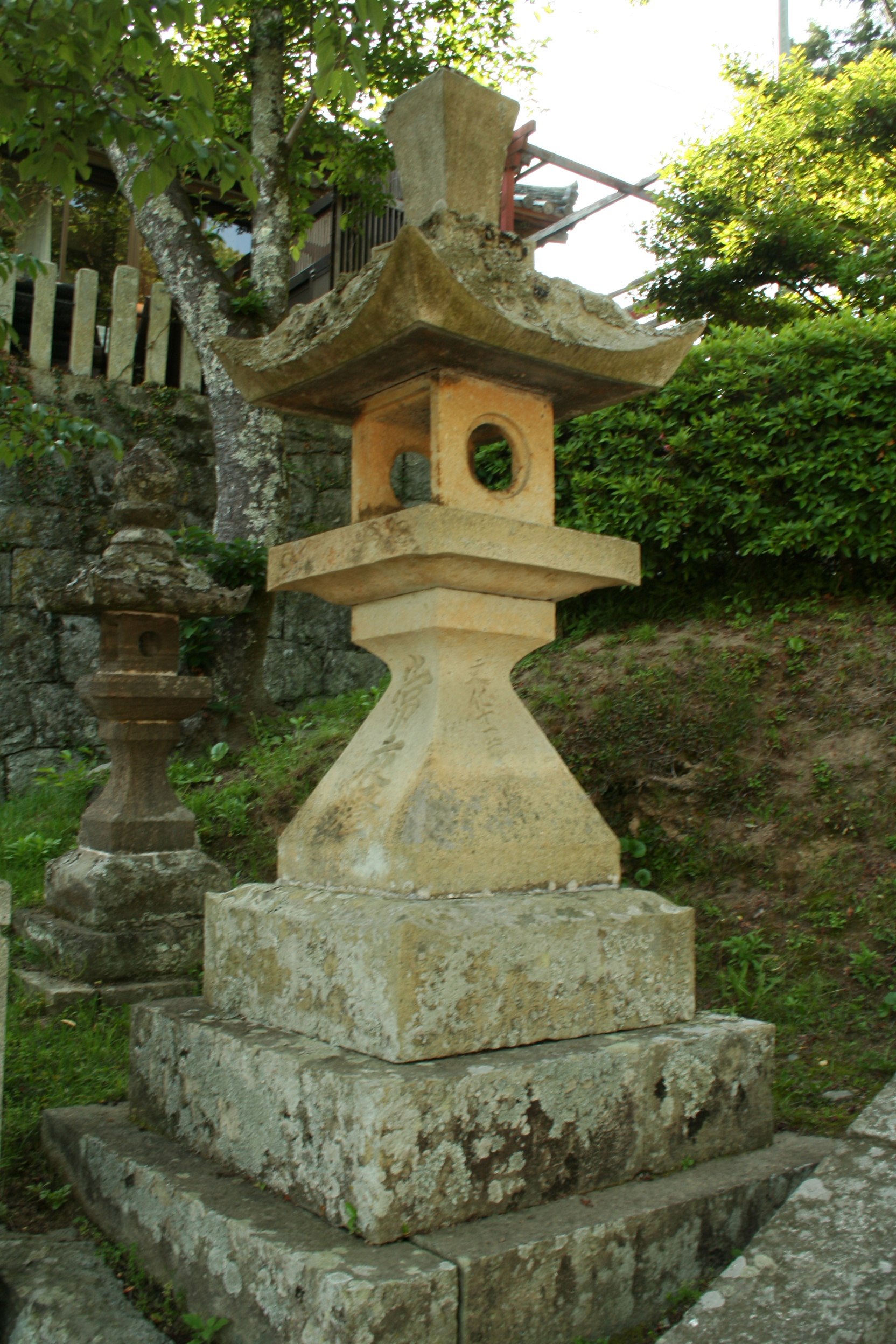
A kaku-dōrō (角灯籠, square lantern)

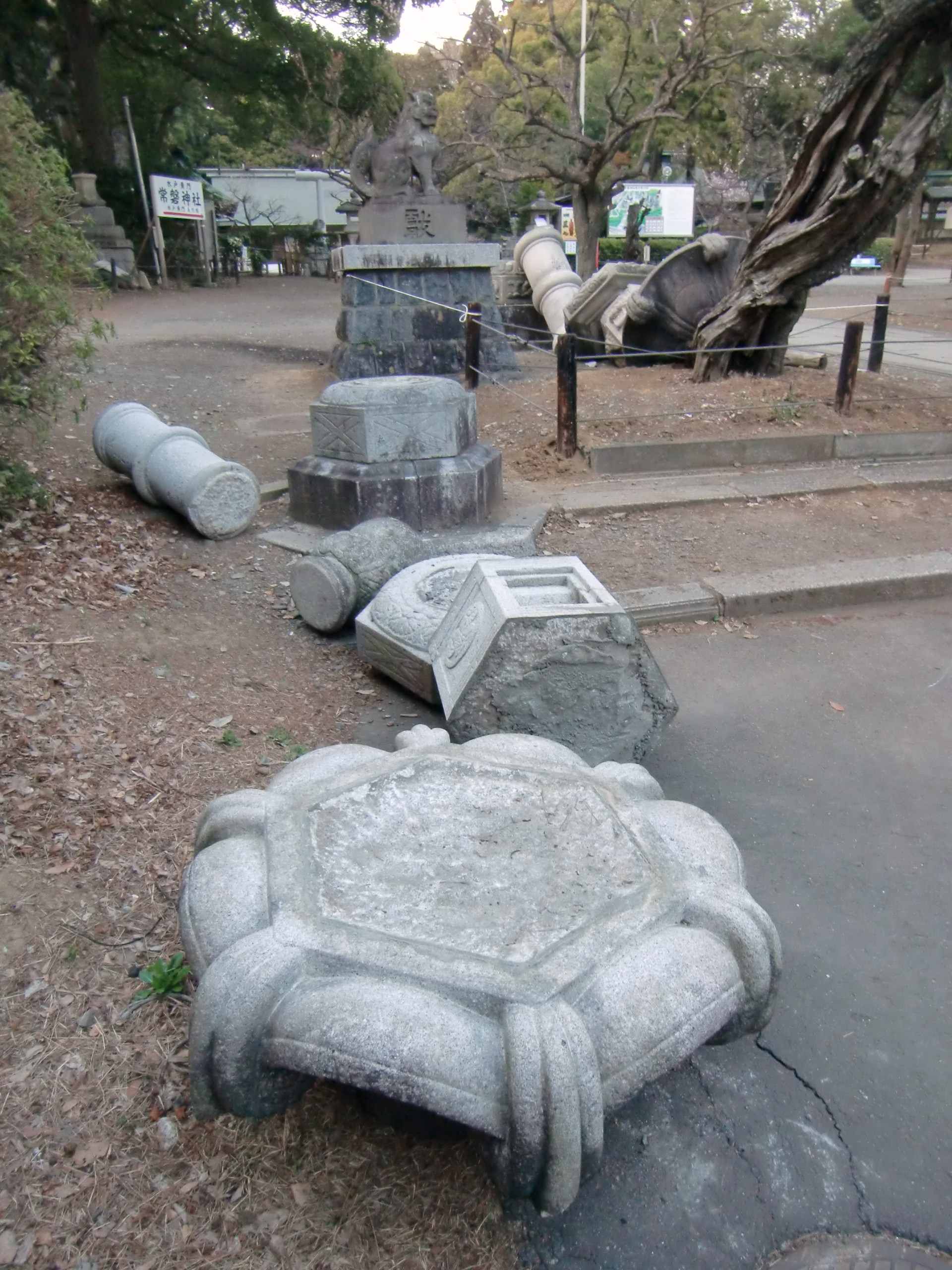
Stone lanterns toppled by the 2011 Tohoku earthquake in Mito, Ibaraki Prefecture, showing the numerous pieces of carved stone that make up each lantern

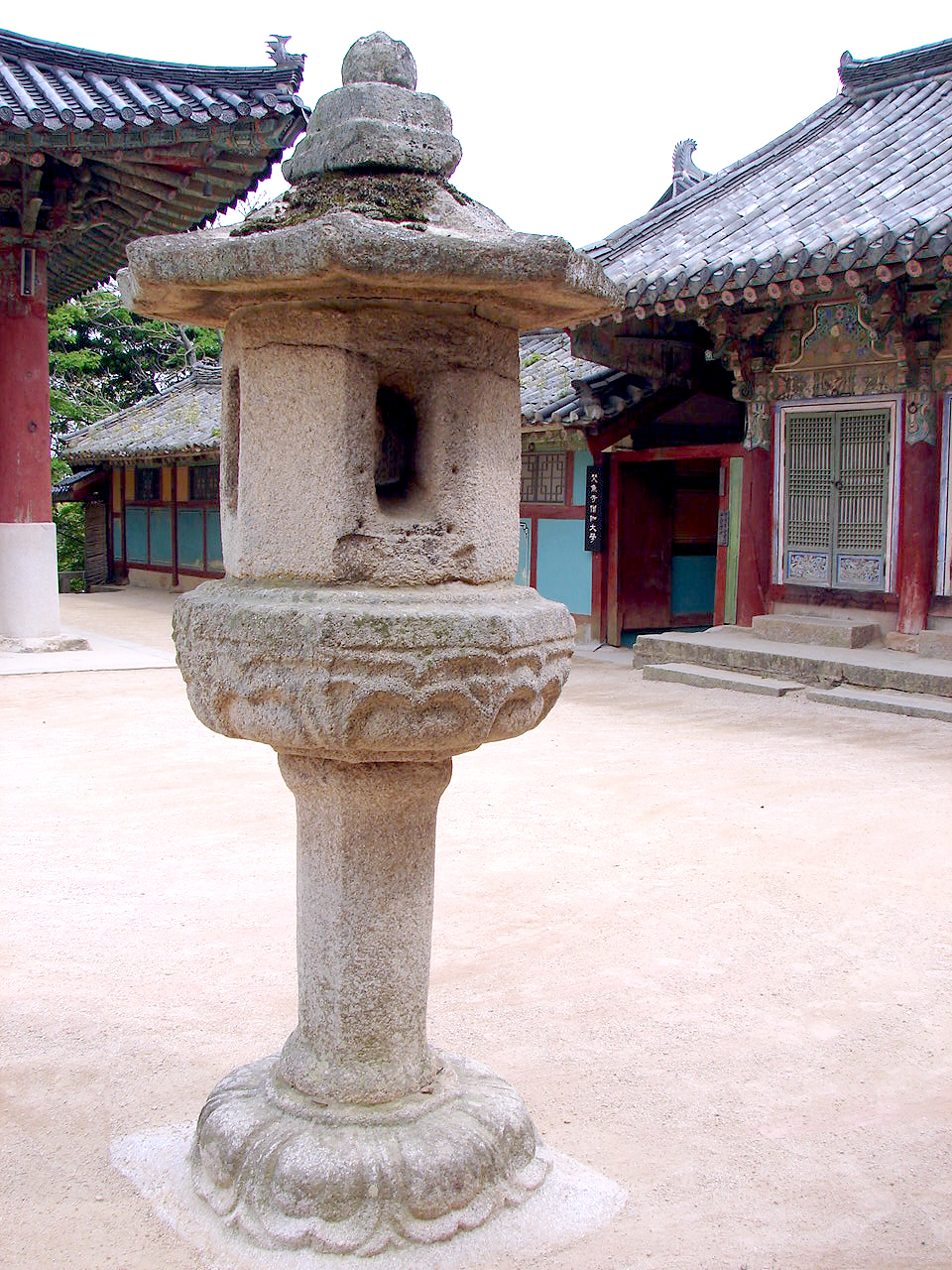
A stone lantern in Korea

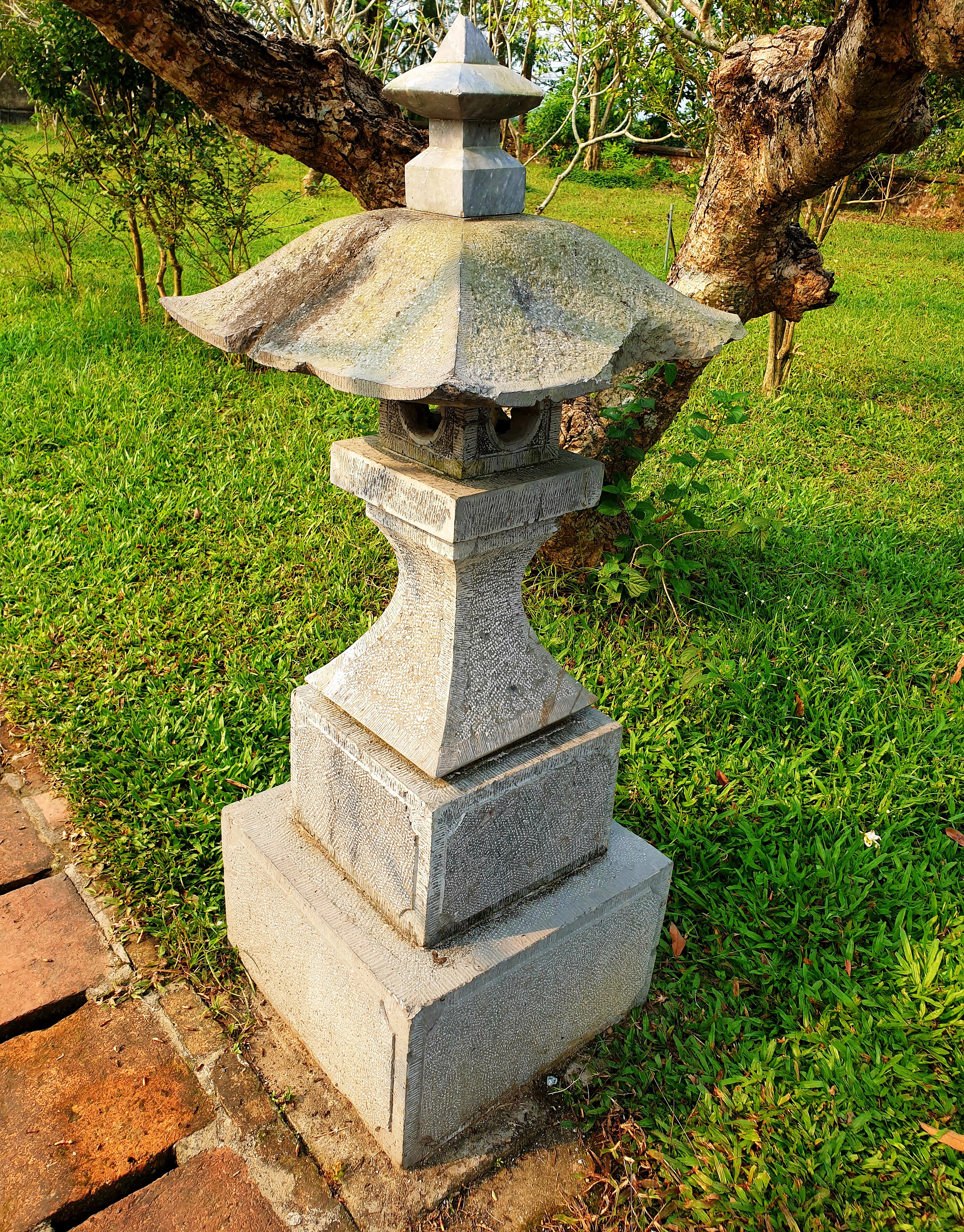
A stone lantern at Thiên Mụ Temple, Vietnam

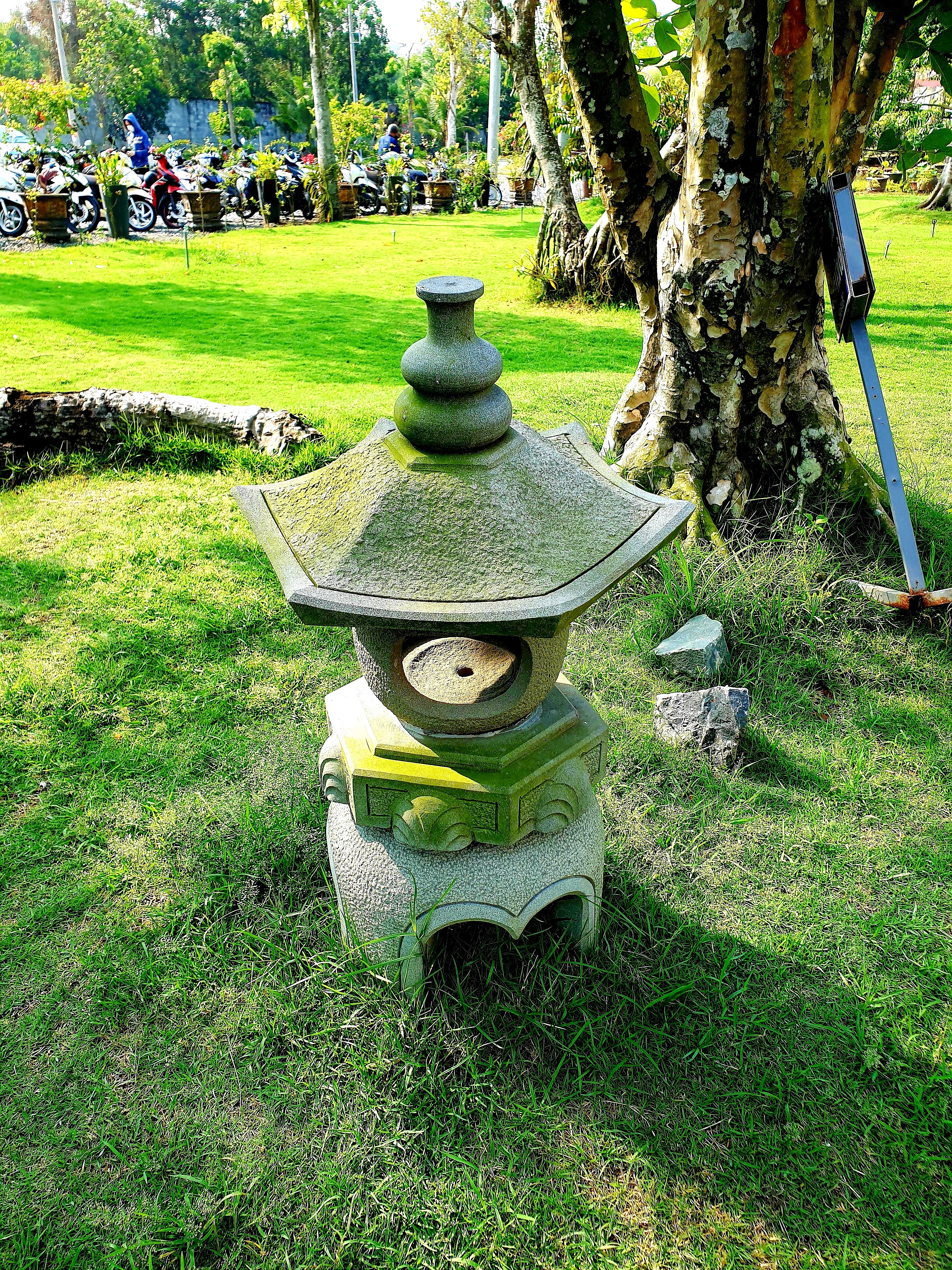
A stone lanterns at Phật Cô Đơn Temple, Vietnam

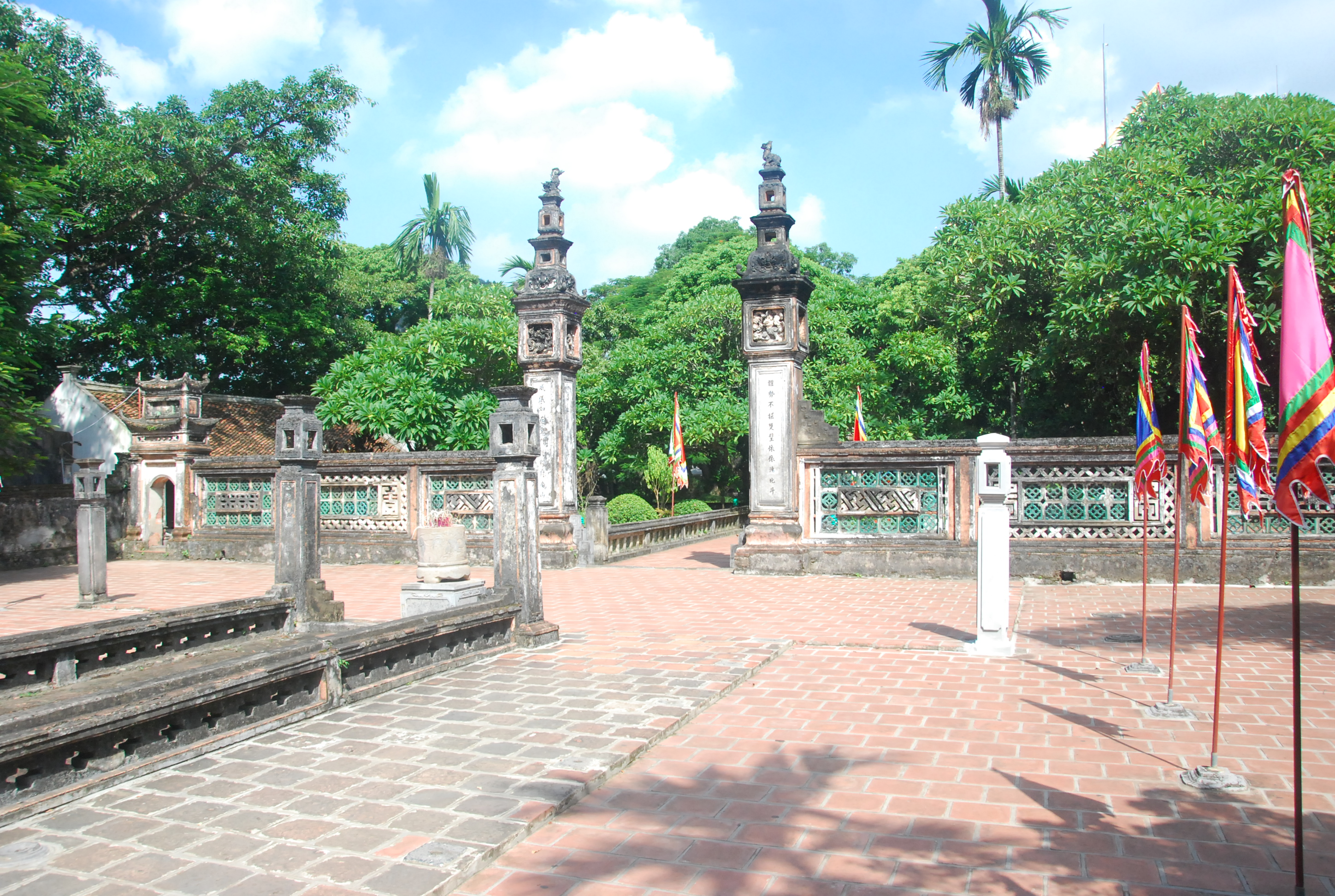
Stone lanterns in Đinh Tiên Hoàng Temple, Ninh Bình, Vietnam

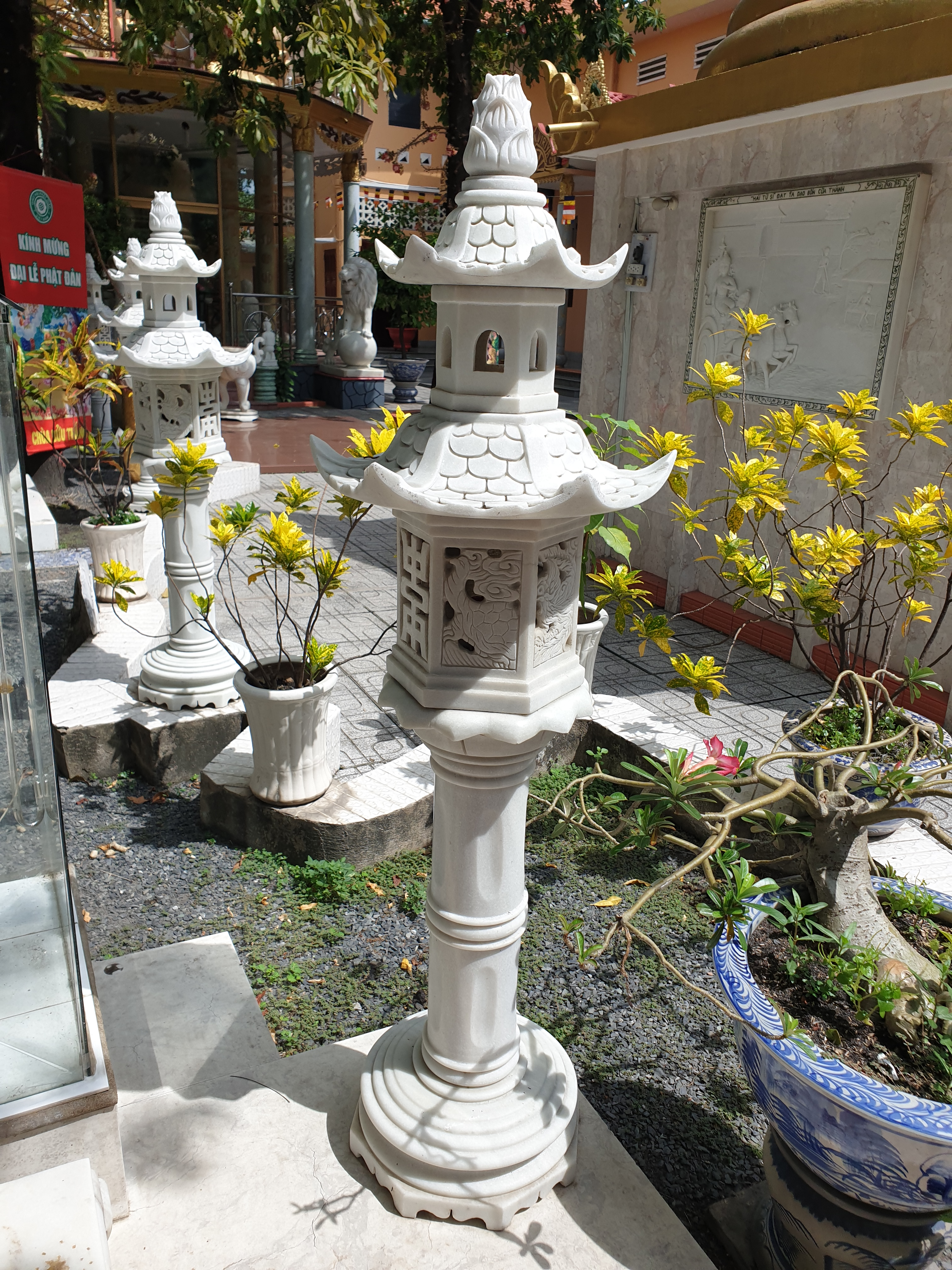
A stone lantern in Bửu Thắng Temple, HCMC, Vietnam

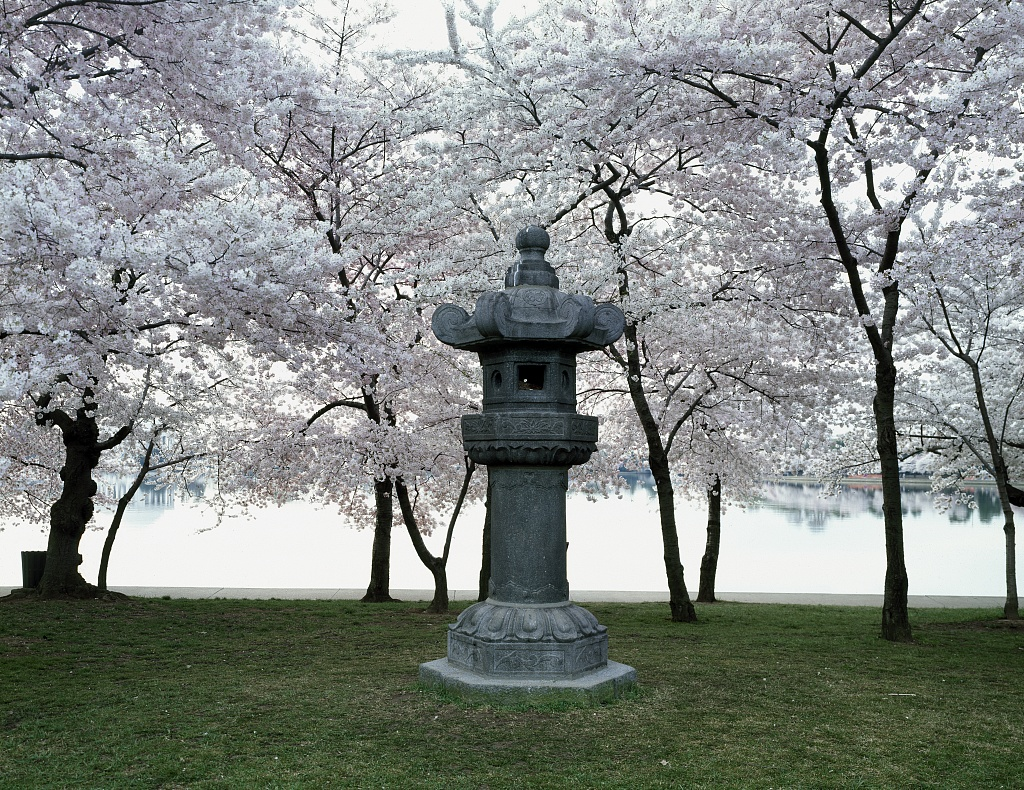
Japanese lantern in West Potomac Park, Washington

=== Yukimi-dōrō variants ===
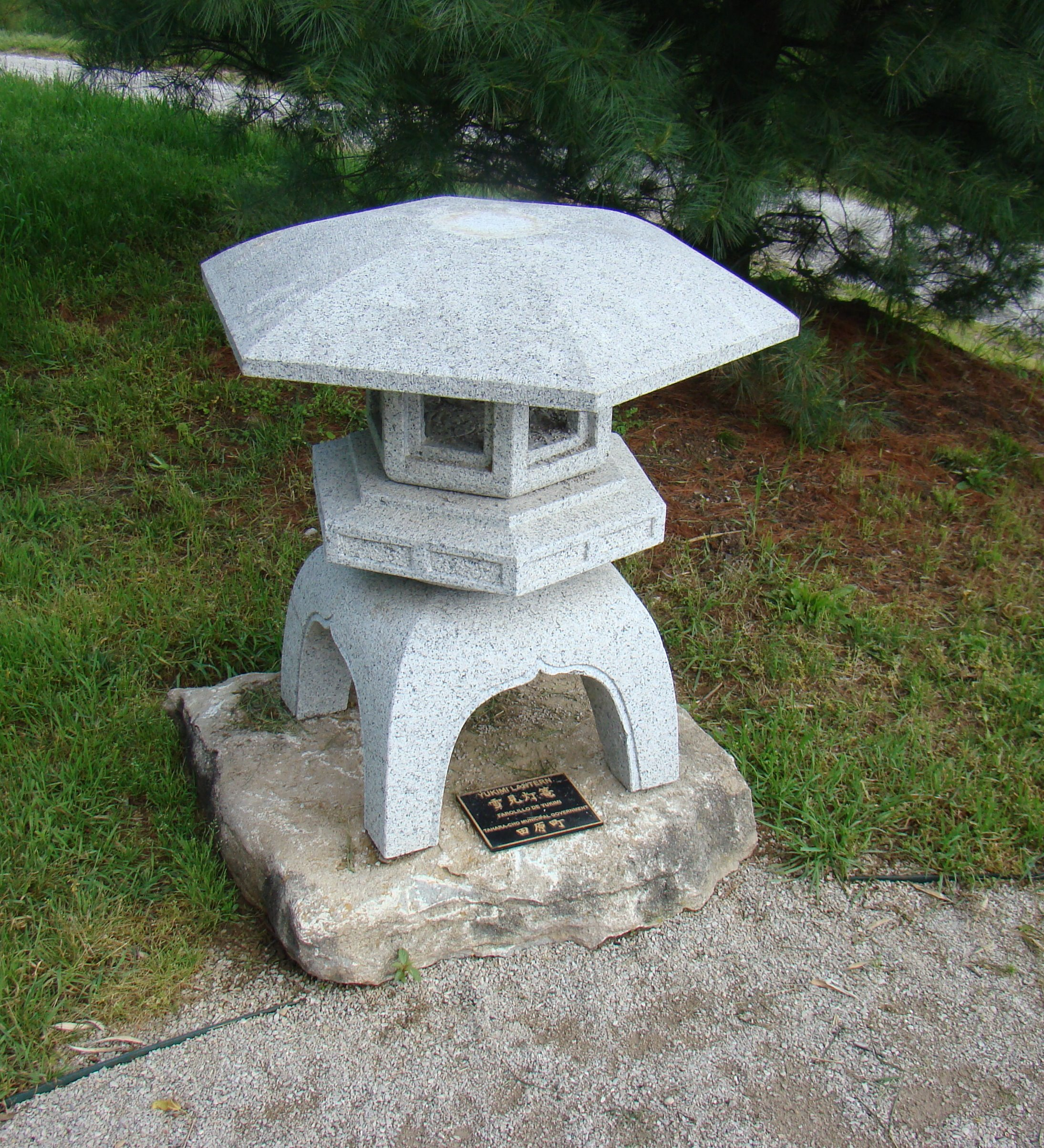
Four-legged yukimi-dōrō

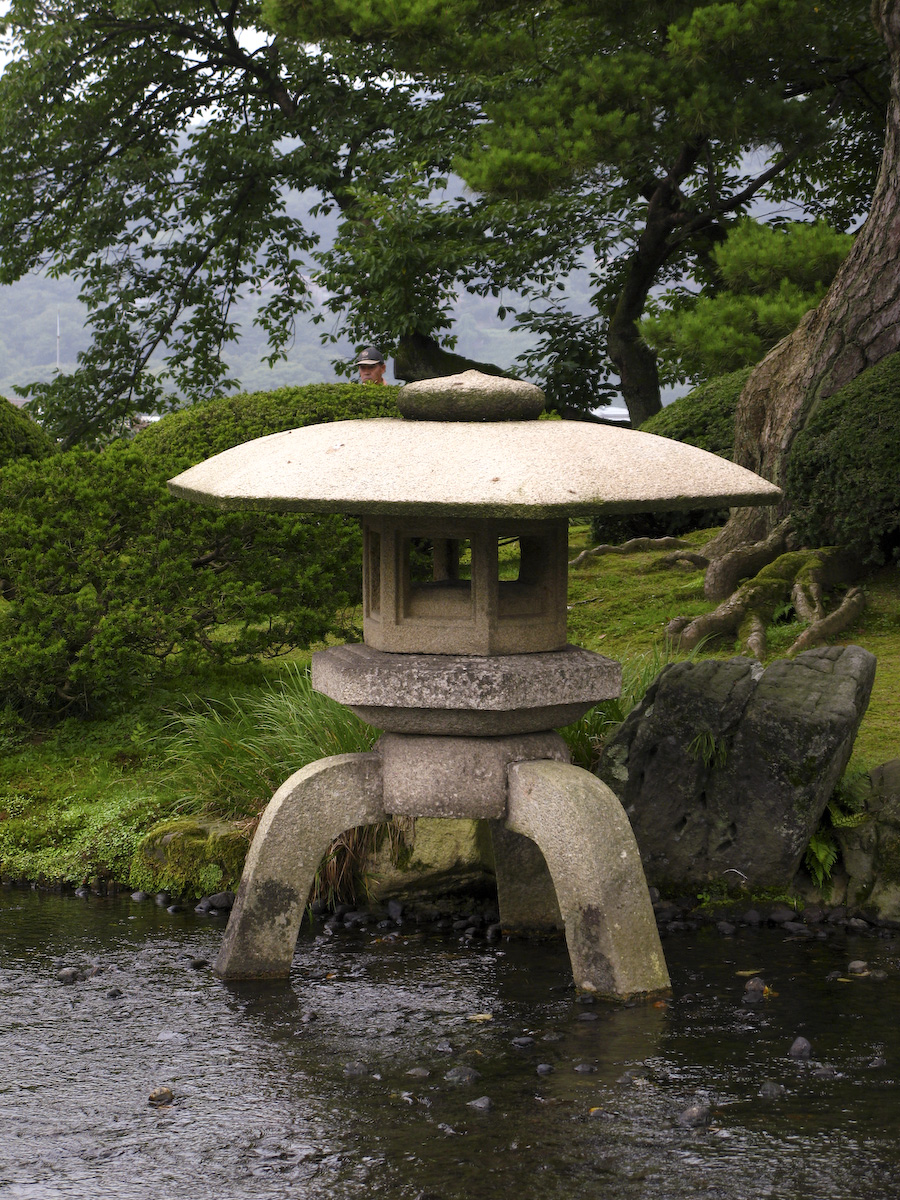
Three legged yukimi-dōrō. One leg rests on ground, two in water.

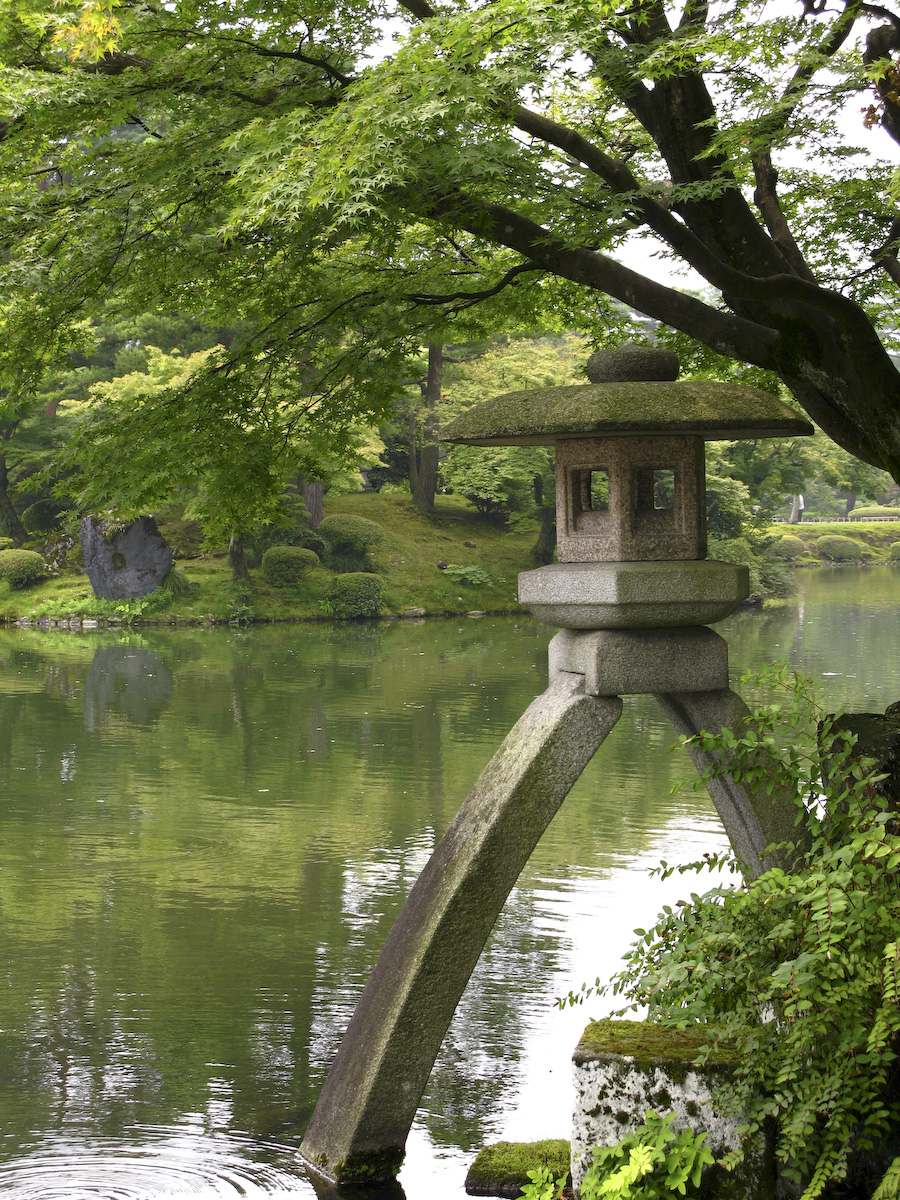
Two-legged yukimi-dōrō

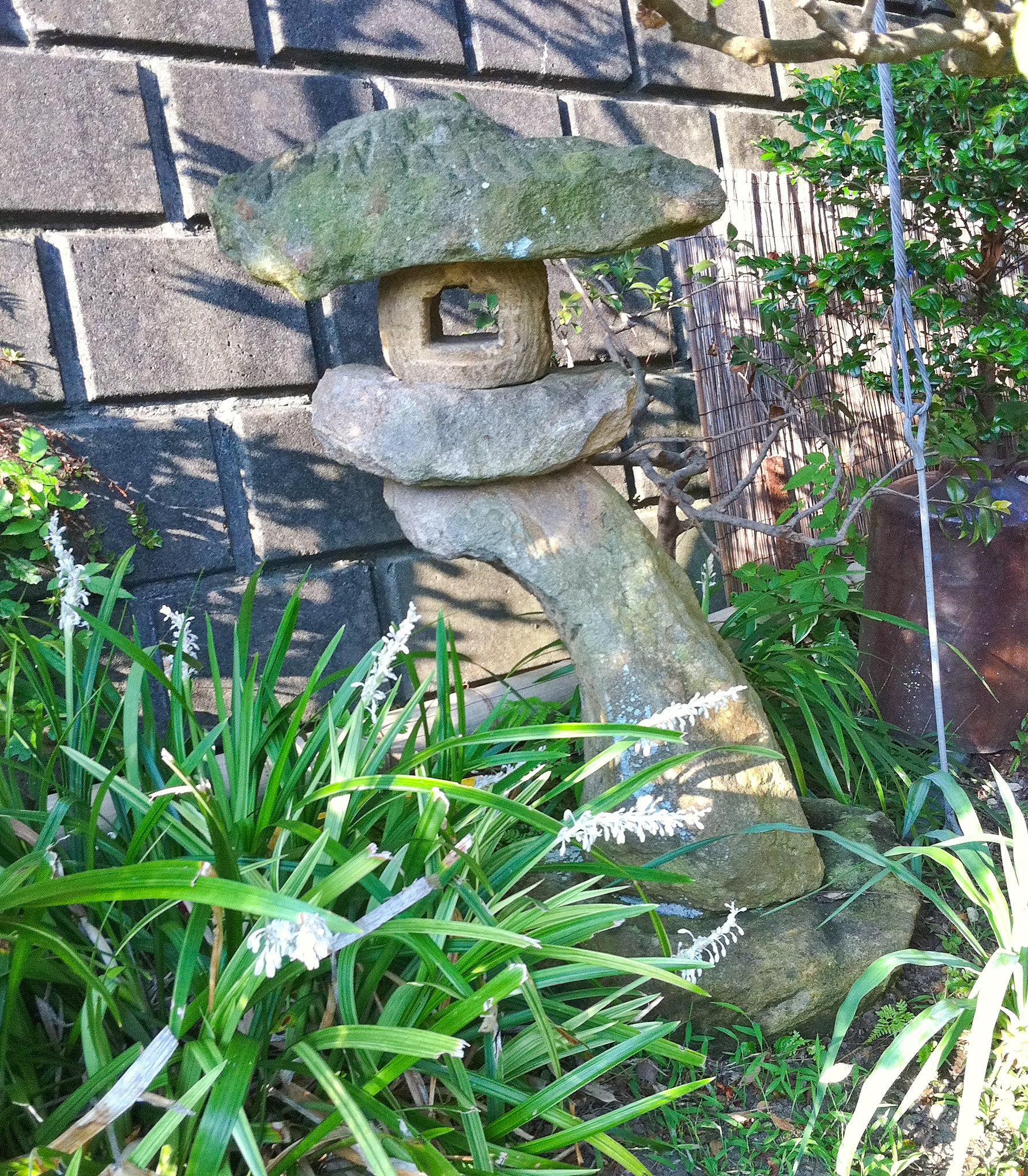
One-legged rankei-dōrō

== See also ==
- Traditional lighting equipment of Japan
- Glossary of Shinto
