= Monroe-Woodbury High School =

High school serving two named towns in Orange County, New York

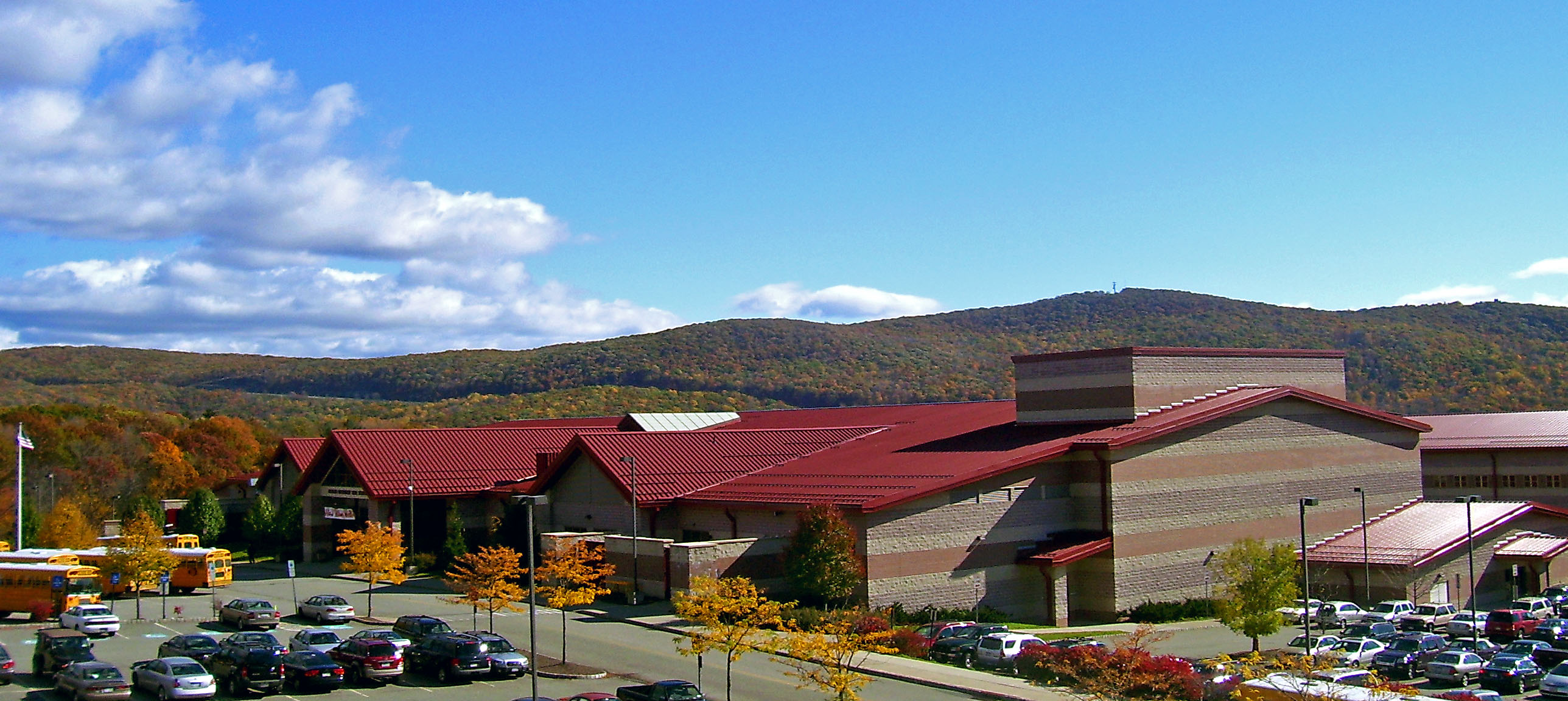

Location
- 155 Dunderberg Road; Central Valley, New York 10917; 41.3238°N 74.1348°W

Information
- School type: Public, high school
- Motto: Pursuit of Excellence
- Founded: 2001
- School district: Monroe-Woodbury Central School District
- Principal: Jason McElroy
- Teaching staff: 164.07 (on an FTE basis)
- Grades: 9-12
- Enrollment: 2,285 (2024–2025)
- Student to teacher ratio: 13.93
- Language: English
- Colors: Purple, white, black
- Team name: Crusaders
- Communities served: Town of Monroe; Village of Monroe; Town and Village of Woodbury (part); Harriman; Town of Tuxedo
- Website: www.mw.k12.ny.us/o/mwhs/

Monroe-Woodbury High School is located in Central Valley, New York, part of the town and village of Woodbury in Orange County. It educates all students in grades 9-12 in the Monroe-Woodbury Central School District.

== Notable alumni ==
- David Bernsley (born 1969), American-Israeli basketball player; principal of the high school
- Shane Burgos, UFC Featherweight
- Chloe Chambers, racing driver
- Bull Dempsey, wrestler
- Andy Grammer, musician
- Amy Gutmann, former president of the University of Pennsylvania and current U.S. ambassador to Germany
- J. Michael Mendel, television producer (The Simpsons, Rick and Morty)
- Jermaine Paul, won The Voice in 2012
- Lovie Simone, actress (Class of 2016): Greenleaf (TV series), Selah and the Spades, etc.
- James Skoufis, New York state senator elected to office in 2018
- John Trautmann, American long-distance runner. 1992 Olympian 5000 meters.

== Extra-curricular activities ==
The Monroe Woodbury High School also boasts many extra-curricular activities, both athletic and academic, among them being computer club, drama club, art guild, chess club, history club, interact, pep band, math team, mock trial, model UN, National Honor Society, The Wire News, Odyssey of the Mind, Science Olympiads, and student government. In sports, there are teams in cheerleading, football, soccer, tennis, cross country running, alpine skiing, track, swimming, golf, volleyball, lacrosse, wrestling, ice hockey, basketball, baseball, and softball.

The football team won the New York class AA state championship in 2005.

The boys cross country team won the New York state federation championships in 2022, 2023 and 2024. In 2023 and 2024 they competed at the Nike Cross National championships.

== See also ==
- Education in New York
- List of high schools in New York (state)
