= The Curious Case of Kiryas Joel =

2016 book by Louis Grumet and John Caher

The Curious Case of Kiryas Joel: The Rise of a Village Theocracy and the Battle to Defend the Separation of Church and State is a 2016 book by Louis Grumet and John Caher, published by Chicago Review Press.

== Background ==
It is about the Board of Education of Kiryas Joel Village School District v. Grumet, which was about the formation of the Kiryas Joel School District. The main author, who headed the New York State School Board Association, was the plaintiff of the case.

== Reception ==
Publishers Weekly wrote that the style of the narrative "relies heavily on [the author's] own personal sympathies" against and for certain groups; the publication argues that the "details and gossipy tone" complicate the book.

Kirkus Reviews described it as "a readable look at the nitty-gritty of New York’s political machine."

== See also ==
- American Shtetl - A book about Kiryas Joel
