= American Shtetl =

American Shtetl: The Making of Kiryas Joel, a Hasidic Village in Upstate New York is a 2022 book by Nomi M. Stolzenberg and David N. Myers, published by Princeton University Press.

The book describes the creation of Kiryas Joel, New York.

According to Mordechai "Motti" Inbari of the University of North Carolina, Pembroke, information on related lawsuits are what the book "is mainly focused on".

Yaakov Ariel of the University of North Carolina-Chapel Hill wrote that the book uses "broad comparative lenses," and the authors characterized Kiryas Joel as something American as opposed to simply something Jewish Orthodox.

== Background ==
One author is a professor of law, and the other is a professor of history.

== Contents ==
Chapters 1-3 are in Part I and chapters 4-6 are in Part II. Part I describes the history of the Satmar in Europe and in the United States, and how they live in Kiryas Joel. The lawsuit issues are described in part II.

Chapter 7 describes schisms in the politics of Kiryas Joel. The book described the community's actions during the COVID-19 pandemic in New York (state).

== Reception ==
The book won the American Jewish Studies Celebrate 350 Award, under the National Jewish Book Awards.

Yaakov Ariel of University of North Carolina-Chapel Hill stated that he "highly [recommends] the book."

Inbari wrote that the work's information on separation of church and state and "a fresh insight into the Satmar world" make the book "important manuscript in many ways."

Independent scholar Menachem Keren-Kratz stated that the work "often reads like a John Grisham legal thriller" and that the combined credentials of the authors and strength in forming the narration makes the work "stand out". Keren-Kratz states that much of the sourcing comes from the Hasidic community and that the book did not consider previous scholarship, which makes the book "hagiographic".

Lis Harris, in New York Review of Books wrote that the book is "meticulously researched".

Chaim I. Waxman of Rutgers University and Hadassah Academic College described the work as "fascinating and very enlightening." He argued that the thesis that the Satmar in Kiryas Joel ended up being Americanized was not "completely convincing."

== See also ==
- The Curious Case of Kiryas Joel - A book about the lawsuits around the Kiryas Joel school district
