= Wallkill Correctional Facility =

Medium-security state prison, located in New York, US

Coordinates: 41°37′41″N 74°09′48″W

- Interactive map of Wallkill Correctional Facility
- Location: 50 Mc Kendrick Road Wallkill, New York
- Status: operational
- Security class: medium
- Capacity: 606
- Opened: 1933
- Managed by: New York State Department of Corrections and Community Supervision

The Wallkill Correctional Facility is a medium security prison in New York state in the United States. The prison is located just north of the hamlet of Wallkill, in the Town of Shawangunk.

== History ==
The prison opened in 1933, in the form of a collegiate campus with no surrounding wall or fence. The architect was Alfred Hopkins, an east-coast estate architect with a sideline in prisons such as Lewisburg Federal Penitentiary in Pennsylvania. Connected three-story English Gothic buildings of gray stone "self-consciously embraced an idealistic notion of the rural idyll and an old-fashioned sense of place". Hopkins also designed Woodbourne Correctional Facility and Coxsackie Correctional Facility for the state.

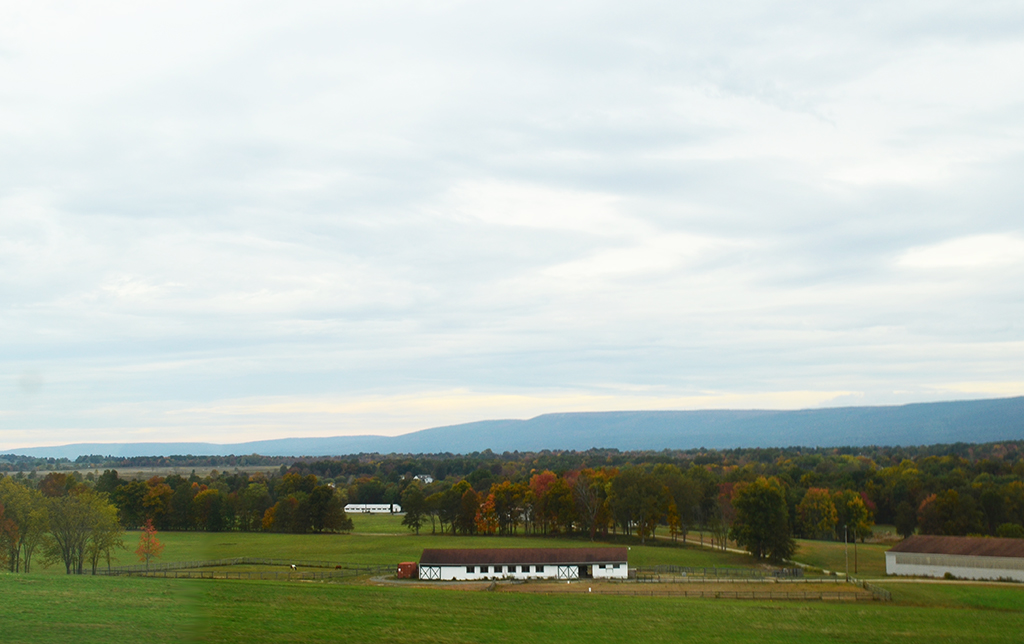
View of landscape near the Walstein Childs House on prison grounds

== Inmate population ==
Wallkill was once only used to house "Good Behavior/White Collar" inmates. Due to changing times, the inmate population has changed and first-time offenders now begin and end their sentences at Wallkill CF. The one-time "Prison without a Wall," is no more—in the 21st century chain-link fencing and razor wire was constructed around the perimeter.

== On-premise activities ==
The facility has a long-running optical laboratory to grind lenses and produce eyeglasses. Inmates may also learn to serve retired racehorses through the Thoroughbred Retirement Foundation's Second Chances program.

Wallkill's grounds contain the historic Walstein Childs House, circa 1763. The state's Shawangunk Correctional Facility is also nearby.
