= David N. Myers =

American scholar and academic

- Born: November 2, 1960 (age 65); Scranton, Pennsylvania, U.S.
- Occupation: Historian

Academic background
- Education: Yale University, Columbia University
- Website: davidnmyers.com

David N. Myers (born November 2, 1960) is a professor of history at the University of California, Los Angeles, where he holds the Sady and Ludwig Kahn Chair in Jewish History. Myers was the president and CEO of the Center for Jewish History from July 2017 to August 2018. He serves as the President of the New Israel Fund Board.

== Early life ==
A native of Scranton, Pennsylvania, Myers received his A.B. cum laude from Yale University in 1982. He commenced graduate studies in Jewish history at Tel Aviv University (1982–84), where he studied with Anita Shapira, Yaakov Shavit, Matitiyahu Mintz, and Moshe Mishkinsky, before moving on to study medieval Jewish thought with Isadore Twersky at Harvard University (1984–85). He then moved to Columbia University, where he worked under the supervision of Yosef Hayim Yerushalmi, whose work and thought left a profound impression on him and remain a source of ongoing scholarly interest. Myers received his Ph.D. with distinction in 1991.

== Academic career ==
Myers joined the faculty of the UCLA History Department in 1991 as a lecturer and 1992 as an assistant professor. He published his first book, Re-Inventing the Jewish Past: European Jewish Intellectuals and the Zionist Return to History, in 1995. Myers served for ten years as the director of the UCLA Center for Jewish Studies and, from 2010 to 2015, as the Robert N. Burr Department Chair of the UCLA History Department. He also has served since 2003 as the co-editor, along with Elliott Horowitz and Natalie Dohrmann, of the Jewish Quarterly Review. He is an elected fellow of the American Academy for Jewish Research. He received the inaugural Sady and Ludwig Kahn Chair in Jewish History at UCLA in 2015. In 2022, he completed a book with Nomi M. Stolzenberg on the Satmar Hasidic community of Kiryas Joel, New York. This book, American Shtetl, was awarded the National Jewish Book Award for American Jewish Studies in 2022.

Myers' early work focused on the intersection of the history of Jewish historiography and the history of Zionism in his dissertation and first book on the founding generation of the Institute for Jewish Studies of the Hebrew University in Jerusalem. His next book, Resisting History, continued his interest in intellectual history and modes of historical thought, but shifted focus to German Jewish thinkers in the late Wilhelmine and Weimar eras. Myers' next book, Between Jew and Arab, engaged the enigmatic Jewish thinker Simon Rawidowicz—and an intriguing essay on Palestinian refugees that he wrote for inclusion in his monumental book Bavel vi-Yerushalayim, but ultimately decided not to include. Myers then wrote a short synthesis on Jewish history as part of the Oxford University Press VSI series. His next book, The Stakes of History, was a reflection on the historian and historiographical practice that was initially delivered as the Franz Rosenzweig Lectures at Yale in 2014. Already in the early 2000s, Myers began to develop a scholarly interest in the history and politics of Haredi communities, especially Kiryas Joel, New York. For almost two decades, he worked together with his wife on a book on Kiryas Joel that was published in 2022 as American Shtetl. At present, Myers is working on a research project devoted to mid-twentieth-century population displacements through the lens of political and affective history.

== Center For Jewish History ==
In 2017, Myers was appointed CEO of Center for Jewish History.

Following Myers' appointment, some in the Jewish community objected to his activism in organizations supportive of Israeli-Palestinian peace and co-existence, while simultaneously hundreds of Jewish historians responded by expressing their support for Myers. Those who demanded his resignation included Israeli Knesset Member Bezalel Smotrich, as well as the Zionist Organization of America and others. The right-wing Middle East Forum opined "Myers may present a moderate façade, but his academic & political affiliations expose his radical core." According to the Forward, "the campaign against Myers appears to have shaken the CJH," though Myers has stated that the protests were only a nuisance early in his tenure and were not the reason for his decision to leave the center. “After the first two unpleasant months, I had a great time here,” Myers said.

Despite the attacks by groups associated with the Israeli right, Jewish studies scholars in the United States largely rallied behind Myers. In an op-ed defending Myers, Brandeis professors Jonathan Sarna and Rabbi David Ellenson wrote, "The writings of David Myers indisputably fall well within the scholarly mainstream of Jewish life and they are unquestionably supportive of Israel’s basic right to exist."

Myers stepped down from this position in August 2018, returning to UCLA full time. “This is the result of months of deliberation spent on planes going back and forth and really asking myself, Where do I want to be in life?” he said.

== New Israel Fund ==
He became President of the New Israel Fund board in October 2018 after serving as a board member. He also has served as an instructor for the Wexner Heritage Foundation, and writes frequently on matters of contemporary Jewish concern.

== Published books ==
=== Authored ===
- Re-Inventing the Jewish Past: European Jewish Intellectuals and the Zionist Return to History. New York: Oxford University Press, 1995 ISBN 978-0195098426
- Resisting History: Historicism and its Discontents in German-Jewish Thought. Princeton: Princeton University Press, 2003 ISBN 978-0691146607
- Between Jew and Arab: The Lost Voice of Simon Rawidowicz. Hanover and London: Brandeis University Press, 2008 ISBN 978-1584657361
- Jewish History: A Very Short Introduction. New York: Oxford University Press, 2016 ISBN 9780199730988
- The Stakes of History: On the Use and Abuse of Jewish History for Life. New Haven: Yale University Press, 2018. ISBN 9780300228939
- American Shtetl: The Making of Kiryas Joel, a Hasidic Village in Upstate New York. Princeton: Princeton University Press, 2022. ISBN 9780691199771

=== Edited ===
- David N. Myers and William V. Rowe, eds. From Ghetto to Emancipation: Historical and Contemporary Reconsiderations of the Jewish Community, introduction by D. N. Myers. Scranton, PA: University of Scranton Press, 1997 ISBN 9780940866720
- David N. Myers and David B. Ruderman, eds. The Jewish Past Revisited: Reflections on Modern Jewish Historians, introduction by D. N. Myers. New Haven: Yale University Press, 1998 ISBN 9780300191530
- Elisheva Carlebach, John M. Efron, and David N. Myers, eds. Jewish History and Jewish Memory: Essays in Honor of Yosef Hayim Yerushalmi. Hanover, NH: University Press of New England, 1998 ISBN 978-0874518719
- Richard Hovannisian and David N. Myers, eds. Enlightenment and Diaspora: The Armenian and Jewish Cases. Atlanta: Scholars Press, 1999 ISBN 978-0788506048
- Michael Brenner and David N. Myers, eds. Jüdische Geschichtsschreibung heute: Themen, Positionen, Kontroversen. Munich: Beck Verlag, 2002 ISBN 978-3406488788
- David N. Myers et al. eds. Acculturation and its Discontents: The Italian Jewish Experience between Integration and Exclusion. Toronto: University of Toronto Press, 2008 ISBN 9780802098511
- David N. Myers and Alexander Kaye, eds. The Faith of Fallen Jews: Yosef Hayim Yerushalmi and the Writing of Jewish History. Hanover, NH: University Press of New England, 2013 ISBN 978-1611684872
- Michael A. Meyer and David N. Myers, eds. Between Jewish Tradition and Modernity: Essays in Honor of David Ellenson. Detroit: Wayne State University Press, 2014 ISBN 9780814338599
- David N. Myers, eds. The Eternal Dissident: Rabbi Leonard I. Beerman and the Radical Imperative to Think and Act. Oakland, CA, 2018. ISBN 978-0520297456
- David N. Myers and Benjamin C.I. Ravid, eds. Simon Rawidowicz: Between Babylon and Jerusalem: Select Writings. Goettingen: Vandenhoeck & Ruprecht GmbH & Co KG, 2022. ISBN 9783525311257
