= David Bernsley =

American-Israeli basketball player

David Bernsley דייוויד ברנסלי
Personal information
- Born: May 6, 1969 (age 57) Monroe, New York
- Listed height: 6 ft 7 in (2.01 m)

Career information
- High school: Monroe-Woodbury (Central Valley, New York)
- College: Rhode Island (1987–1988); Manhattan (1989–1992)
- NBA draft: 1992: undrafted
- Position: Power forward / center

David Scott Bernsley (Hebrew: דייוויד ברנסלי; born May 6, 1969) is an American-Israeli former basketball player. He played the forward and center positions. He played in the Israeli Basketball Premier League, and for the Israeli national basketball team. He later became an educator and a high school principal.

== Early and personal life ==
Bernsley is a native of Monroe, New York, and is 6 ft 7 in (201 cm) tall. His parents are Harvey and Valerie Bernsley. He and his wife Karen have five children, and live in Montgomery, New York.

== Basketball career ==
He attended Monroe-Woodbury High School ('87), and played basketball for the school team.

For college Bernsley first attended the University of Rhode Island. He played basketball for the Rhode Island Rams in 1987–88.

Bernsley then attended Manhattan College (Bachelor's degree; '92). He played for the Manhattan Jaspers in 1989–92. In 1991–92 he was 8th in the Metro Atlantic Athletic Conference in blocks, with 27, and 9th in rebounds, with 213. In 1992 he was named to the MAAC All-Championship Team.

He played in the Israeli Basketball Premier League for Hapoel Jerusalem, Maccabi Givat Shmuel, Maccabi Kiryat Motzkin, and Ironi Ramat Gan.

Bernsley also played for the Israeli national basketball team. He competed in the 1997 FIBA European Championship for Men.

== Educator career ==
He earned a master's degree from Iona College, and a Certificate of Advanced Study from SUNY New Paltz ('04). Bernsley taught at Harry S. Truman High School in the Bronx, and at North Rockland High School in Thiells, New York, in Rockland County. He then served as assistant principal at Washingtonville High School. From 2005 to 2010 he was the Principal at Wallkill Senior High School in Wallkill, New York.

In 2010 Bernsley became the Principal of Monroe-Woodbury High School. He served as Principal of the Edmund J. O'Neal Middle School of Excellence in Albany, New York until his unexpected resignation in June 2021.
