= Wallkill Senior High School =

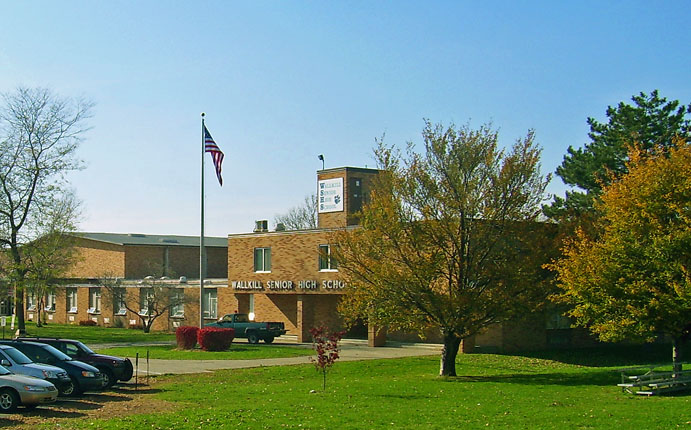

Location
- 90 Robinson Drive; Wallkill, NY 12589; 41°36′31″N 74°10′00″W

Information
- School type: Public, high school
- Motto: Panther Pride
- Founded: September 1968
- Teaching staff: 76.12 (FTE)
- Grades: 9-12
- Enrollment: 983 (2023–2024)
- Student to teacher ratio: 12.91
- Language: English
- Area: Hamlet of Wallkill; Eastern Town of Shawangunk; Northern Town of Montgomery; Northwestern Town of Newburgh
- Colors: Blue and white
- Team name: Panthers
- Website: Wallkill Senior High School

Wallkill Senior High School, located in Wallkill, New York, educates students in grades 9 through 12 in the Wallkill Central School District. It is in a residential neighborhood, on Robinson Drive in the northern end of the hamlet, a few blocks west of NY 208. The Shawangunk Ridge can be viewed from the rear.

In the 2005–06 school year, New York's Education Department classified Wallkill as a "School in Need of Improvement" under the federal No Child Left Behind Act for failing to meet participation quotas on state standardized tests in math.

The school's football team almost won the state championship in 2004. It was leading Binghamton-area Maine-Endwell 36-32 with 19 seconds left in the championship game at Syracuse University's Carrier Dome when an opposing player scored on an 80-yard touchdown run.

The school opened in September 1968, making the former high school the Wallkill Middle School, recently rededicated as the John G. Borden Middle School. The building was designed by architects Clark & Warren of the AIA who also designed several other schools and churches in the area. The building has had several additions and modifications over the years, with several in 1992. An auditorium was built, two classrooms in the courtyard area as well as an expansion to the library. An addition was also built to the north side of the building which consisted of eight additional classrooms. The front entrance was also made handicapped accessible. In 2002, four additional classrooms were added adjacent to the earlier addition. At this time the cafeteria was renovated and expanded enclosing the former walls of windows and adding an outdoor entrance to one side. Windows were also cut in above the secondary front entrance of the school near the flagpole at this time. Seven years later, the school was refitted with new lockers, energy efficient windows and new sidewalks. The school remains the newest and largest in the district.

== Notable faculty ==
- David Bernsley (born 1969), American-Israeli basketball player
