= Kiryas Joel School District =

School district in the U.S. state of New York

- 48 Bakertown Rd, Suite 401 Monroe, NY, 10950-8433

District information
- Grades: Pre-K – 7
- Established: 1989; 37 years ago
- Superintendent: Joel Petlin

Students and staff
- Students: 120 2021-2022 school year
- Teachers: 27 2021-2022 school year
- Staff: 152.4 2021-2022 school year
- Student–teacher ratio: 4.44 2021-2022 school year

Kiryas Joel Village Union Free School District is the public school district of Kiryas Joel, New York. Its purpose is to provide tax-supported special education to pupils in the community. The district also operates school buses and buys school supplies for the students in the community attending private schools; most Kiryas Joel students, as of 1995, attend private yeshivas.

== History ==
The New York State Legislature established the district in 1989. In previous eras the special education students took classes at the private yeshivas but had separate tax-supported teachers. The special education students moved to Monroe-Woodbury Central School District facilities after the United States Supreme Court stated in 1985 that public school instruction cannot be done within an active religious school's facilities. Orthodox Jewish parents complained about discrimination against their children by other students and advocated for creating a special school district covering Kiryas Joel, made up entirely of Orthodox Jewish people.

Governor of New York State Mario Cuomo rationalized that it would be unlikely that someone would sue to block the creation of a special education school district for a small number of children. However New York State School Board Association executive director Louis Grumet sued the state to overturn the law establishing the district. The dispute concerned whether the law violated the constitutional clause against favoring a particular religion. Board of Education of Kiryas Joel Village School District v. Grumet decided by the Supreme Court in 1994, ruled against the existing law. The school district remained in operation as the state government worked on finding another way to authorize its existence. A new law in 1995, which did not specifically state the name of the municipality but permitted the district to exist, was deemed constitutional by New York State Supreme Court justice Lawrence E. Kahn. Grumet later co-wrote The Curious Case of Kiryas Joel: The Rise of a Village Theocracy and the Battle to Defend the Separation of Church and State, which has information about the legal dispute.

In 2002 the district joined the state school board association.

In 2016 the school board okayed transferring 164 acres (66 ha) of land from the Monroe-Woodbury district to the Kiryas Joel district. The school board of Monroe-Woodbury would then have to decide, and upon that confirmation the transfer would be complete. In 2017 all board members of Monroe-Woodbury approved the boundary change.

== Demographics ==
In 2021 the district had 158 students.

In 1994 the district had about 200 students. As of 1994 the students and most of the teachers are Orthodox Jews.

== School ==
Its sole K-12 school facility is called the Kiryas Joel Village School. In 1995 Joseph Berger, in The New York Times, described its facility as a "squat building".
