= Walton Park, New York =

- CDP
- Location in Orange County and the state of New York

- Location within the state of New York
- Coordinates: 41°18′43″N 74°13′26″W
- Country: United States
- State: New York
- County: Orange

Area
  - Total: 3.44 sq mi (8.90 km^{2})
  - Land: 3.08 sq mi (7.99 km^{2})
  - Water: 0.35 sq mi (0.91 km^{2})
- Elevation: 843 ft (257 m)

Population (2020)
  - Total: 3,907
  - Density: 1,266.7/sq mi (489.06/km^{2})
- Time zone: UTC-5 (Eastern (EST))
  - Summer (DST): UTC-4 (EDT)
- FIPS code: 36-78063
- GNIS feature ID: 0968741

Walton Park is a census-designated place (CDP) in Orange County, New York, United States. As of the 2020 census, the CDP had a total population of 3,907. Walton Park is on the town line separating the towns of Chester and Monroe. Street addresses within Walton Park are usually assigned to Monroe, not Chester.

== Geography ==
Walton Park is located at 41°18′43″N 74°13′26″W (41.311849, -74.223838).

According to the United States Census Bureau, the CDP has a total area of 2.7 square miles (7.0 km^{2}), of which 2.4 square miles (6.2 km^{2}) is land and 0.3 square miles (0.78 km^{2}) is water. The total area is 11.57% water.

The community is on the west side of Walton Lake.

== Demographics ==
Historical population
Census	Pop.	Note	%±
2000	2,330		—
2010	2,669		14.5%
2020	3,907		46.4%
U.S. Decennial Census

=== 2020 census ===
As of the 2020 census, Walton Park had a population of 3,907. The median age was 40.0 years. 25.0% of residents were under the age of 18 and 15.3% of residents were 65 years of age or older. For every 100 females there were 96.7 males, and for every 100 females age 18 and over there were 100.3 males age 18 and over.

100.0% of residents lived in urban areas, while 0.0% lived in rural areas.

There were 1,355 households in Walton Park, of which 39.6% had children under the age of 18 living in them. Of all households, 59.9% were married-couple households, 15.3% were households with a male householder and no spouse or partner present, and 17.9% were households with a female householder and no spouse or partner present. About 17.3% of all households were made up of individuals and 7.3% had someone living alone who was 65 years of age or older.

There were 1,442 housing units, of which 6.0% were vacant. The homeowner vacancy rate was 2.1% and the rental vacancy rate was 7.9%.

Racial composition as of the 2020 census
Race	Number	Percent
White	2,637	67.5%
Black or African American	287	7.3%
American Indian and Alaska Native	18	0.5%
Asian	166	4.2%
Native Hawaiian and Other Pacific Islander	0	0.0%
Some other race	400	10.2%
Two or more races	399	10.2%
Hispanic or Latino (of any race)	855	21.9%

=== 2000 census ===
As of the census of 2000, there were 2,330 people, 776 households, and 637 families residing in the CDP. The population density was 983.0 inhabitants per square mile (379.5/km^{2}). There were 871 housing units at an average density of 367.5 per square mile (141.9/km^{2}). The racial makeup of the CDP was 94.08% White American, 1.03% African American, 0.90% Native American, 1.29% Asian, 0.17% Pacific Islander, 1.55% from other races, and 0.99% from two or more races. Hispanic or Latino people of any race were 7.04% of the population.

There were 776 households, out of which 45.1% had children under the age of 18 living with them, 72.6% were married couples living together, 6.8% had a female householder with no husband present, and 17.9% were non-families. 14.3% of all households were made up of individuals, and 4.6% had someone living alone who was 65 years of age or older. The average household size was 3.00 and the average family size was 3.35.

In the CDP, the population was spread out, with 30.1% under the age of 18, 5.3% from 18 to 24, 30.7% from 25 to 44, 25.6% from 45 to 64, and 8.3% who were 65 years of age or older. The median age was 37 years. For every 100 females, there were 100 males. For every 100 females age 18 and over, there were 94.6 males.

The median income for a household in the CDP was $70,938, and the median income for a family was $81,139. Males had a median income of $54,375 versus $34,917 for females. The per capita income for the CDP was $28,463. About 2.5% of families and 2.4% of the population were below the poverty line, including 3.0% of those under the age of 18 and none of those 65 and older.

== Education ==
The school district is Monroe-Woodbury Central School District.
