= Andries DuBois House =

- U.S. National Register of Historic Places
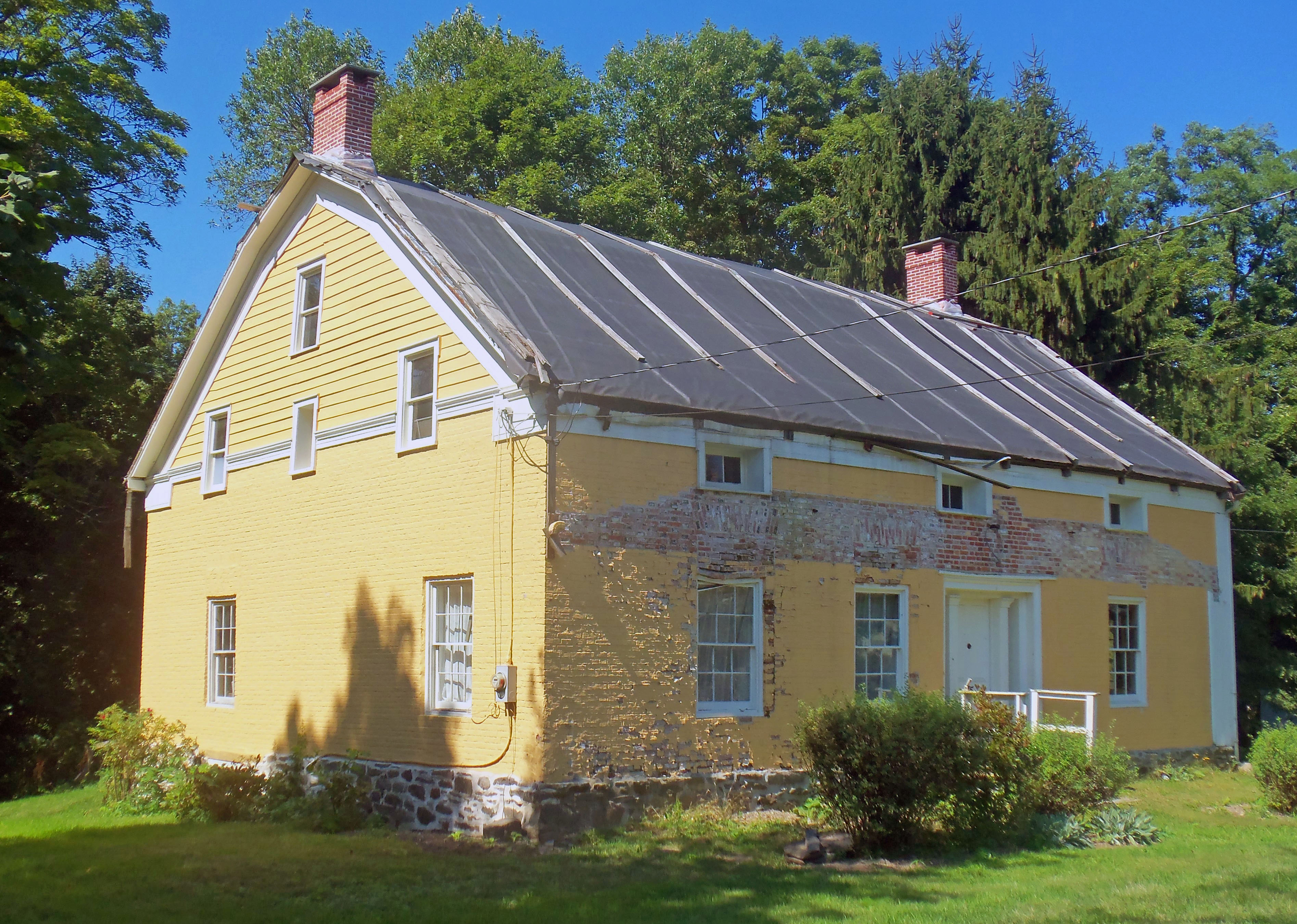
- West profile and south elevation, 2012
- Location: Wallkill, NY
- Nearest city: Newburgh
- Coordinates: 41°36′33″N 74°11′12″W
- Area: less than one acre
- Built: 1814
- Architectural style: Colonial
- NRHP reference No.: 98001011
- Added to NRHP: August 6, 1998

The Andries DuBois House is located on Wallkill Avenue in the hamlet of Wallkill, New York, USA. It is one of the oldest houses in the hamlet, reflecting several different eras of architecture and regional history, and has been a Registered Historic Place since 1998.

It was built by Andries DuBois, a descendant of the original family of Huguenot settlers of nearby New Paltz, who built the house and farmed the land near the Wallkill River around the present-day hamlet. It was believed for a long time that the original construction took place around the middle of the 18th century.

But several features — the gambrel roof, eyebrow windows, classically styled windows, full porch and alternation of brick and wood walls — suggested a different period of origin, or at least substantial subsequent alterations. After the Historical Society of Shawangunk and Gardiner acquired the house in 1998, it applied for and received a $7,500 grant from the Preservation League of New York State in 2003 for a historic structure report.

An examination of the structural lumber dated it, and at first the house's original construction, to 1769. However, that lumber, and an archeological examination of the surrounding soil, showed charcoal layers, evidence of a serious fire at the site. Further investigation showed that the fire destroyed most of the original house, but enough of the framing timbers remained in condition good enough to be reused for the beginning of the current building in 1814. The entrance, windows, porch and interior molding were added in 1845, all reflecting the influence of the then-popular Greek Revival style. Finally, in 1981 the current porch was rebuilt using earlier materials.

The dig also found a variety of artifacts, including early 19th-century American coinage, a comb and a child's doll. Lithics included debitage and a quartz scraper, suggesting a Native American presence at the site prior to the construction of the house.

The Historical Society is currently renovating the house, which had come to some disrepair, with the help of locally raised funds and a grant from the State Historic Preservation Office. It will be used as a local history museum.

== See also ==
- National Register of Historic Places listings in Ulster County, New York
