= City of Joel =

2018 documentary film about Kiryas Joel, NY regional tensions

City of Joel is a 2018 documentary film exploring tensions in the town of Kiryas Joel, where over 20,000 Yiddish-speaking Satmar Hasidim live. Tensions center on the Hasidic residents' desire to annex the land adjacent to their community to allow for their community's future growth. In the film, the Hasidic stance toward the local opposition is one marked by suspicion of local antisemitism, insisting their case is one of constitutional rights to practice their religion. The documentary was directed by filmmaker Jesse Sweet.

== See also ==
- A Life Apart: Hasidism in America
