= J. B. Crowell and Son Brick Mould Mill Complex =

- J. B. Crowell and Son; Brick Mould Mill Complex
- U.S. National Register of Historic Places
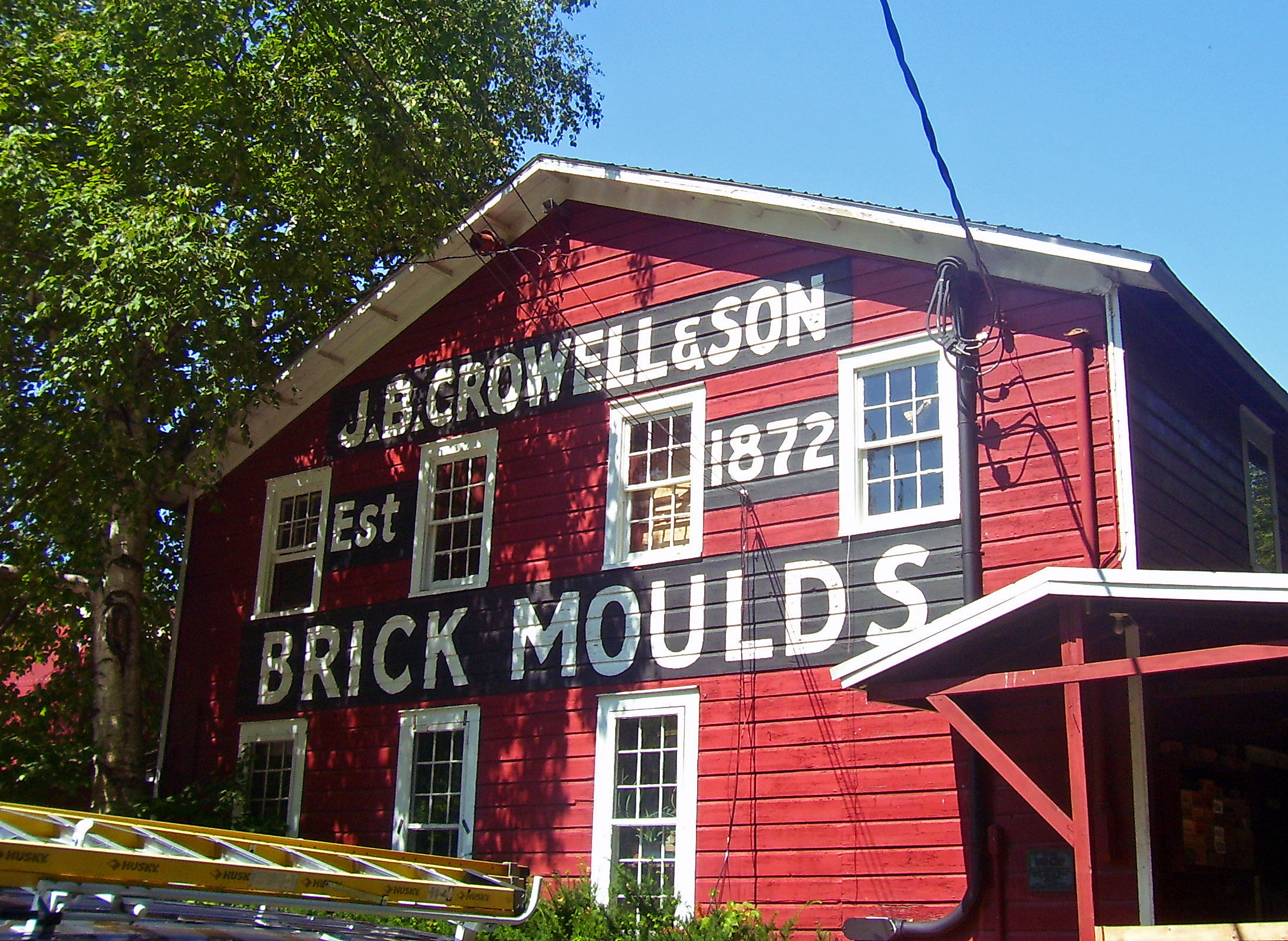
- Main building of the complex, in 2007
- Location: Wallkill, NY
- Nearest city: Newburgh
- Coordinates: 41°37′24″N 74°11′47″W
- Area: 13.5 acres (5.5 ha)
- Built: 1872
- NRHP reference No.: 83001814
- Added to NRHP: June 30, 1983

The J. B. Crowell and Son Brick Mould Mill Complex is located on Lippencott Road near the hamlet of Wallkill, New York, United States, part of the Town of Shawangunk in Ulster County. It was established in 1870 by James Burns Crowell, after he changed his mind about a teaching career. The mill originally made not only brick moulds but wooden agricultural implements such as wheelbarrows and oxbows, as well as children's sleds.

Two years after it began operations, many of the current structures were erected. The complex was added to the National Register of Historic Places in 1983. It has unfortunately closed its operations as of 2020.
