= Wallkill Central School District =

School district in the U.S. state of New York

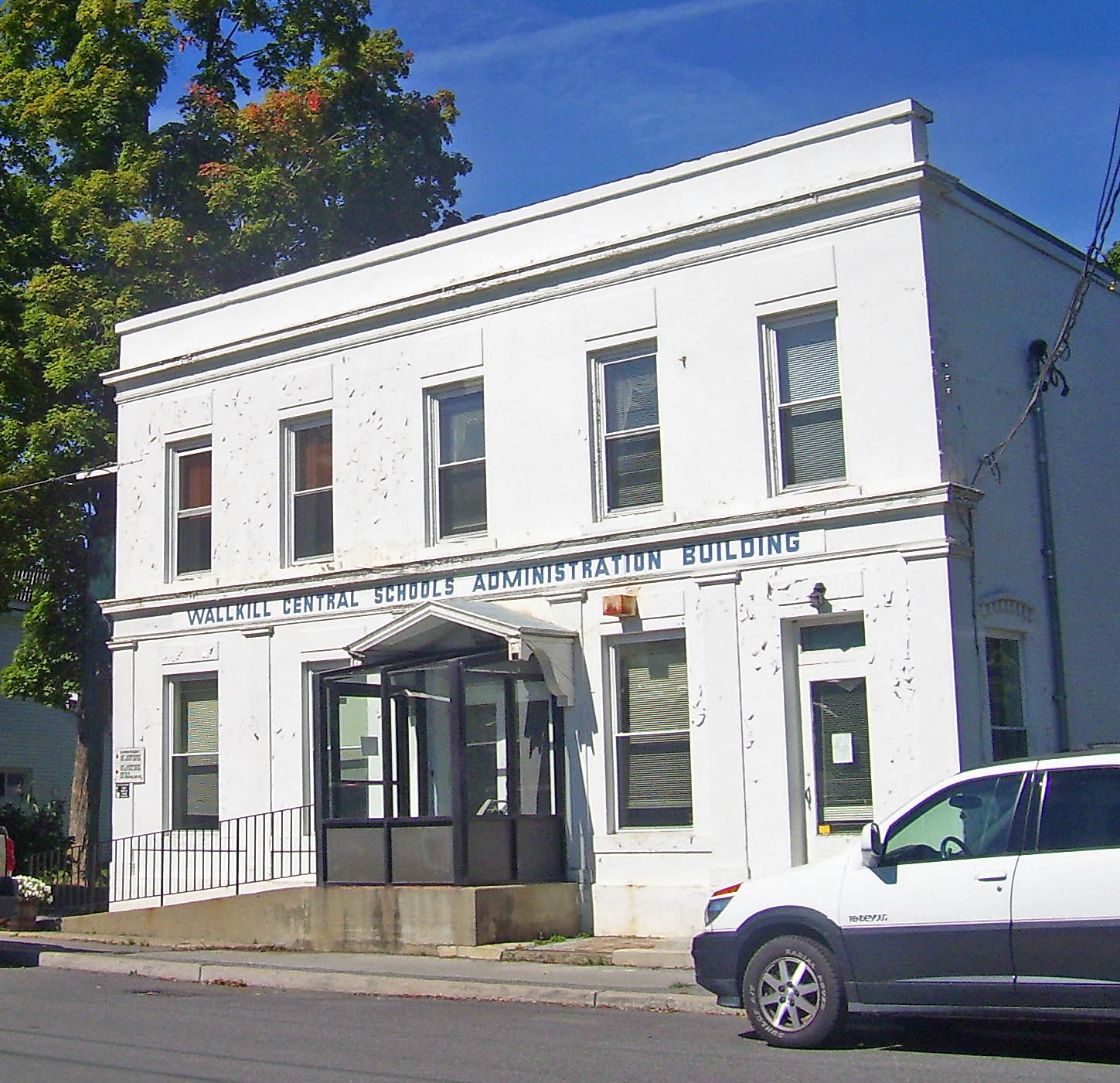
District offices on Main Street in Wallkill.

The Wallkill Central School District is centered in Wallkill, New York. It has three elementary schools, one middle school, and one high school. As of 2006, the school district has about 3,700 students. The district's offices are located in Wallkill and its current superintendent is Mr. Kevin Castle.

While most of its students live in the area commonly identified as Wallkill, primarily the eastern half of the Town of Shawangunk, some come from adjacent areas in the Orange County towns of Montgomery and Newburgh.

== Schools ==
- Wallkill Senior High School
- John G. Borden Middle School
- Ostrander Elementary School
- Plattekill Elementary School
- Leptondale Elementary School

== Board of education ==
- Mr. Dennis O'Mara,
- Mr. Tom McCullough, Vice-President
- Mrs. Kathryn Anderson
- Mr. Joseph Locicero, President
- Mr. Steven Missale
- Mr. Thomas Frisbie
- Mr. Lief Spencer
- Mr. Vincent Petrocelli
- Mrs. Donna Crowley
