= Board of Education of Kiryas Joel Village School District v. Grumet =

- Supreme Court of the United States

Argued March 30, 1994 Decided June 27, 1994
- Full case name: Board of Education of Kiryas Joel Village School District, Petitioner v. Louis Grumet, et al.
- Citations: 512 U.S. 687 (more) 114 S. Ct. 2481; 129 L. Ed. 2d 546; 1994 U.S. LEXIS 4830; 62 U.S.L.W. 4665; 94 Cal. Daily Op. Service 4818; 94 Daily Journal DAR 8917; 8 Fla. L. Weekly Fed. S 359

Case history
- Prior: Grumet v. New York Educ. Dept., 151 Misc. 2d 60, 579 N.Y.S.2d 1004 (Sup. Ct. 1992); affirmed sub. nom., Grumet v. Bd. of Educ. of the Kiryas Joel Vil. School Dist., 187 A.D.2d 16, 592 N.Y.S.2d 123 (App. Div., 3d Dept. 1992); affirmed, 81 N.Y.2d 518, 601 N.Y.S.2d 61, 618 N.E.2d 94 (1993); cert. granted, 510 U.S. 989 (1993).

Holding
- A New York statute that carved out a school district that followed village lines, which village was almost entirely composed of members of one religious group, was held to violate the Establishment Clause of the United States Constitution.

Court membership
- Chief Justice William Rehnquist Associate Justices Harry Blackmun · John P. Stevens; Sandra Day O'Connor · Antonin Scalia; Anthony Kennedy · David Souter; Clarence Thomas · Ruth Bader Ginsburg

Case opinions
- Majority: Souter (parts I, II-B, II-C, III), joined by Blackmun, Stevens, O'Connor, Ginsburg
- Plurality: Souter (parts II (introduction), II-A), joined by Blackmun, Stevens, Ginsburg
- Concurrence: Blackmun
- Concurrence: Stevens, joined by Blackmun, Ginsburg
- Concurrence: O'Connor
- Concurrence: Kennedy
- Dissent: Scalia, joined by Rehnquist, Thomas

Laws applied
- U.S. Const., amend. I

Board of Education of Kiryas Joel Village School District v. Grumet, 512 U.S. 687 (1994), was a case in which the United States Supreme Court ruled on the constitutionality of a school district created with boundaries that matched that of a religious community – in this case, the Satmar community of Kiryas Joel, New York. The case was argued by Nathan Lewin on behalf of Kiryas Joel, Julie Mereson on behalf of the State of New York, and Jay Worona on behalf of the respondents.

== Opinion of the court ==
The court, in an opinion by Justice Souter, held that the creation of a school district unit of government designed to coincide with the neighborhood boundaries of a religious group constitutes an unconstitutional aid to religion. Souter concluded that "government should not prefer one religion to another, or religion to irreligion": "There is more than a fine line between the voluntary association that leads to a political community comprising people who share a common religious faith, and the forced separation that occurs when the government draws explicit political boundaries on the basis of peoples' faith. In creating the district in question, New York crossed that line."

== Dissent ==
Justice Scalia, in his dissent, acknowledged that the residents of this district are Satmar Hasidic Jews, but noted of the Satmar community:

[A]ll its residents also wear unusual dress, have unusual civic customs, and have not much to do with people who are culturally different from them ... On what basis does Justice Souter conclude that it is the theological distinctiveness rather than the cultural distinctiveness that was the basis for New York State's decision? The normal assumption would be that it was the latter, since it was not theology but dress, language, and cultural alienation that posed the educational problem for the children.

Scalia argued that the Satmar school district aided the Satmars as a culture rather than a religion, and thus did not constitute impermissible aid to a religious group. The majority, Scalia asserted, would "laud this humanitarian legislation if all of the distinctiveness of the students of Kiryas Joel were attributable to the fact that their parents were nonreligious commune dwellers, or American Indians, or Gypsies," and concluded that "creation of a special, one-culture school district for the benefit of those children would pose no problem. The neutrality demanded by the Religion Clauses requires the same indulgence towards cultural characteristics that are accompanied by religious belief."

== See also ==
- List of United States Supreme Court cases, volume 512
- List of United States Supreme Court cases by the Rehnquist Court
