= Highland Mills, New York =

- Former CDP
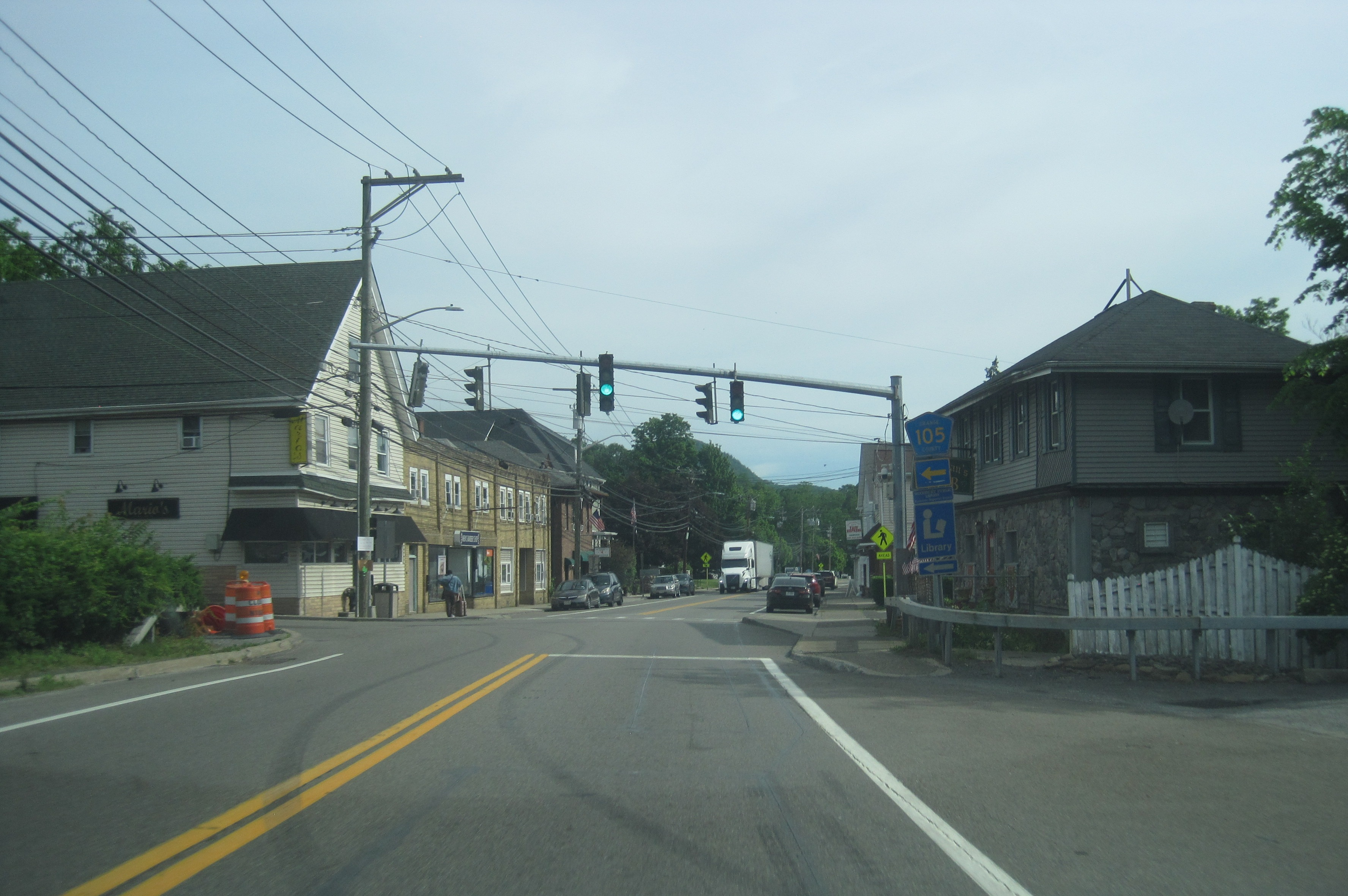
- Northbound NY 32 in Highland Mills

- Location within the state of New York Highland Mills (the United States)
- Coordinates: 41°21′5″N 74°7′40″W
- Country: United States
- State: New York
- County: Orange

Area
  - Total: 1.7 sq mi (4.5 km^{2})
  - Land: 1.7 sq mi (4.5 km^{2})
  - Water: 0 sq mi (0.0 km^{2})
- Elevation: 509 ft (155 m)

Population (2000)
  - Total: 3,468
  - Density: 2,007/sq mi (775.1/km^{2})
- Time zone: UTC-5 (Eastern (EST))
  - Summer (DST): UTC-4 (EDT)
- ZIP code: 10930
- Area code: 845
- FIPS code: 36-34517
- GNIS feature ID: 0952789

Highland Mills is a hamlet and former census-designated place (CDP) in Orange County, New York, United States. The population was 3,468 at the 2000 census. It is part of the Kiryas Joel–Poughkeepsie–Newburgh metropolitan area as well as the larger New York metropolitan area.

Highland Mills is in the town and village of Woodbury adjacent to the New York State Thruway (Interstate 87). The U.S. Census Bureau ceased counting Highland Mills as a separate designated place when the town of Woodbury incorporated as a village.

== Geography ==
Highland Mills is located at 41°21′5″N 74°7′40″W (41.351299, -74.127810).

According to the United States Census Bureau, the CDP had a total area of 1.7 square miles (4.4 km^{2}), of which 1.7 square miles (4.4 km^{2}) is land and 0.58% is water. Highland Mills is located in the southeastern corner of New York State, approximately one hour north-northwest of New York City.

== Demographics ==
As of the census of 2000, there were 3,468 people, 1,196 households, and 955 families residing in the CDP. The population density was 2,007.5 inhabitants per square mile (775.1/km^{2}). There were 1,279 housing units at an average density of 740.4 per square mile (285.9/km^{2}). The racial makeup of the CDP was 87.17% white, 5.07% African American, .14% Native American, 2.71% Asian, .06% Pacific Islander, 2.36% from other races, and 2.48% from two or more races. Hispanic or Latino of any race were 9.05% of the population.

There were 1,196 households, out of which 47.5% had children under the age of 18 living with them, 66.3% were married couples living together, 10.5% had a female householder with no husband present, and 20.1% were non-families. 16.6% of all households were made up of individuals, and 4.3% had someone living alone who was 65 years of age or older. The average household size was 2.90 and the average family size was 3.3.

In the CDP, the population was spread out, with 31.3% under the age of 18, 4.8% from 18 to 24, 32.6% from 25 to 44, 24.7% from 45 to 64, and 6.6% who were 65 years of age or older. The median age was 36 years. For every 100 females, there were 91.8 males. For every 100 females age 18 and over, there were 88 males.

The median income for a household in the CDP was $80,581, and the median income for a family was $84,249. Males had a median income of $62,281 versus $37,857 for females. The per capita income for the CDP was $30,257. About 1.7% of families and 3% of the population were below the poverty line, including 2.8% of those under age 18 and 1.8% of those age 65 or over.
