= Walstein Childs House =

Historic house in New York, United States

- U.S. National Register of Historic Places
- Location within New York Location within the United States
- Nearest city: Wallkill, New York
- Coordinates: 41°38′33″N 74°10′8″W
- Area: 126.8 acres (51.3 ha)
- Built: 1763
- Architectural style: Colonial
- NRHP reference No.: 03000602
- Added to NRHP: July 03, 2003

Walstein Childs House is a historic home located at Wallkill in Ulster County, New York. It is a 1 1/2-story, five-bay rectangular shaped stone dwelling constructed about 1763.

It was listed on the National Register of Historic Places in 2003.
