= Kiryas Joel, New York =

Village in New York, United States

Kiryas Joel, New York קרית יואל
- Village
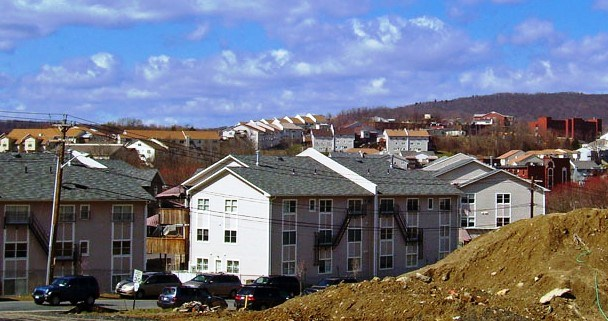
- Kiryas Joel in 2006

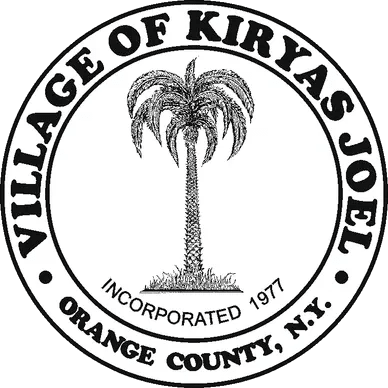
- Seal
- Nickname: KJ
- Location in Orange County, New York

- Location within New York Location within the United States
- Coordinates: 41°20′24″N 74°10′2″W
- Country: United States
- State: New York
- County: Orange
- Town: Palm Tree
- Named for: Joel Teitelbaum

Government
  - Mayor: Abraham Wieder
  - Administrator: Gedalye Szegedin

Area
  - Total: 1.49 sq mi (3.86 km^{2})
  - Land: 1.46 sq mi (3.79 km^{2})
  - Water: 0.031 sq mi (0.08 km^{2})
- Elevation: 843 ft (257 m)

Population (2020)
  - Total: 32,954
  - Estimate (2025): 47,147 ▲
  - Density: 29,970/sq mi (11,573/km^{2})
- Time zone: UTC-5 (US EST)
  - Summer (DST): UTC-4 (Eastern Daylight Time)
- Postal code: 10950
- Area code: 845
- FIPS code: 36-39853
- GNIS feature ID: 0979938
- Website: kiryasjoel.org

Kiryas Joel (Yiddish: קרית יואל, romanized: Kiryas Yoyel, pronounced [ˈkɪrjəs ˈjɔɪ.əl]; often locally abbreviated as KJ) is a village coterminous with the Town of Palm Tree in Orange County, New York, United States. The population was 32,954 at the 2020 census, approximately 5% of the estimated 712,000 population of the Kiryas Joel–Poughkeepsie–Newburgh metropolitan area. The vast majority of its residents are Yiddish-speaking Hasidic Jews who belong to the worldwide Satmar sect of Hasidism.

According to the Census Bureau's American Community Survey, Kiryas Joel has by far the youngest median age population of any municipality in the United States, and the youngest, at 11.4 years old, of any population center of over 5,000 residents in the United States. Kiryas Joel has seen significant population growth since the 2000s. According to 2020 census figures, the village has a high poverty rate with about 40% of the residents living below the federal poverty line. It is the place in the United States with the highest percentage of people who reported Hungarian ancestry, as 18.9% of the population reported Hungarian descent in 2000.

Abraham Wieder has served as mayor of Kiryas Joel since 1997; Gedalye Szegedin has served as its administrator since 2004 or earlier.

== History ==
Kiryas Joel is named for Joel Teitelbaum, the late rebbe of Satmar and driving spirit behind the project. Kiryas roughly translates to town or village.

The Satmar Hasidim came from Satu Mare, Romania, known when under Hungarian rule as Szatmár. Teitelbaum, originally from Austria-Hungary, rebuilt the Satmar Hasidic dynasty after World War II.

In 1947, Teitelbaum settled with his followers in the Williamsburg neighborhood of Brooklyn, a borough of New York City.

By the 1970s, he decided to move the growing community to the Town of Monroe, a suburban location in Upstate New York that was more secluded from what he considered the harmful influences and immorality of the outside world, yet still close enough to the New York metropolitan area. The land for Kiryas Joel was purchased in the early 1970s, and 14 Satmar families settled there in the summer of 1974. Monroe town officials initially expressed skepticism over Teitelbaum's and his followers' plans to build multi-family housing in Kiryas Joel, but they eventually allowed the village to incorporate in 1976. When he died in 1979, Teitelbaum was the first person to be buried in the village's cemetery. His funeral reportedly brought over 100,000 mourners to Kiryas Joel.

In 2001, Kiryas Joel held a competitive election in which all candidates supported by the grand rebbe were re-elected by a 55–45% margin.

In 2019, the village of Kiryas Joel separated from the town of Monroe, to become part of the town of Palm Tree, New York's first new town in 38 years. On July 1, 2018, Governor Andrew Cuomo signed a bill to create Palm Tree, triggering elections for the first governing board. The new town had 10 elected positions on the November 2018 ballot, including a supervisor, four council members, and two justices to preside over a town court.

The name "Palm Tree" is a calque (translation) of the surname/family name of Joel Teitelbaum. In Yiddish, teitel (טייטל) means "date palm" and baum means "tree".

== Geography ==
According to the United States Census Bureau, the village has a total area of 1.1 square miles (2.8 km^{2}), and only a very small portion of the area (a small duck pond called "Forest Road Lake" in the center of the village) is covered with water.

== Demographics ==
Historical population
| Census | Pop. | Note | %± |
|---|---|---|---|
| 1980 | 2,088 | | — |
| 1990 | 7,437 | | 256.2% |
| 2000 | 13,138 | | 76.7% |
| 2010 | 20,175 | | 53.6% |
| 2020 | 32,954 | | 63.3% |
| 2025 (est.) | 47,147 | ▲ | 43.1% |
United States Census Bureau:

=== Racial and ethnic composition ===
Kiryas Joel village, New York – Racial composition
| Race (NH = Non-Hispanic) | 2020 | 2010 | 2000 | 1990 | 1980 |
|---|---|---|---|---|---|
| White alone (NH) | 96.5% (31,356) | 98.1% (19,794) | 98.3% (12,921) | 98.1% (7,295) | 100% (2,087) |
| Black alone (NH) | 0.2% (57) | 0.1% (18) | 0.2% (26) | 0% (2) | 0% (0) |
| American Indian alone (NH) | 0.1% (17) | 0% (1) | 0% (0) | 0.1% (10) | 0% (0) |
| Asian alone (NH) | 0% (13) | 0.1% (12) | 0% (3) | 0.1% (5) | |
| Pacific Islander alone (NH) | 0% (12) | 0% (2) | 0% (0) | | |
| Other race alone (NH) | 0% (0) | 0% (2) | 0% (0) | 0% (1) | |
| Multiracial (NH) | 2% (672) | 0.4% (76) | 0.5% (66) | — | — |
| Hispanic/Latino (any race) | 1.4% (465) | 1.3% (270) | 0.9% (122) | 1.7% (124) | 0% (1) |

=== 2020 census ===
As of the 2020 census, Kiryas Joel had a population of 32,954. The median age was 14.4 years. 58.7% of residents were under the age of 18 and 2.7% of residents were 65 years of age or older. For every 100 females there were 107.8 males, and for every 100 females age 18 and over there were 110.2 males age 18 and over.

100.0% of residents lived in urban areas, while 0.0% lived in rural areas.

There were 5,837 households in Kiryas Joel, of which 77.3% had children under the age of 18 living in them. Of all households, 91.6% were married-couple households, 3.4% were households with a male householder and no spouse or partner present, and 4.6% were households with a female householder and no spouse or partner present. About 4.2% of all households were made up of individuals and 1.7% had someone living alone who was 65 years of age or older.

There were 6,207 housing units, of which 6.0% were vacant. The homeowner vacancy rate was 0.1% and the rental vacancy rate was 2.5%.

=== 2010 census ===
| Languages (2010) | Percent |
|---|---|
| Spoke Yiddish at home | 91.5% |
| Spoke only English at home | 6.3% |
| Spoke Hebrew at home | 2.3% |
| Spoke English "not well", or "not at all" | 46.0% |

=== 2000 census ===
Kiryas Joel began with a 1977 founding population of 500 people. As of the 2000 census, there were 2,229 households, and 2,137 families residing in the village. The population density was 11,962.2 inhabitants per square mile (4,618.6/km^{2}). There were 2,233 housing units, at an average density of 2,033.2 per square mile (785.0/km^{2}). The racial make-up of the village was 99.02% White, 0.21% African American, 0.02% Asian, 0.12% from other races, and 0.63% from two or more races. Hispanic or Latino of any race were 0.93% of the population.

| Largest ancestries (2000) | Percent |
|---|---|
| Hungarian | 18.9% |
| American | 8.0% |
| Israeli | 3.0% |
| Romanian | 2.0% |
| Polish | 1.0% |
| Czech | 0.3% |
| Russian | 0.3% |
| German | 0.2% |

Kiryas Joel has the highest percentage of people who reported Hungarian ancestry in the United States, as 18.9% of the population reported Hungarian ancestry in 2000. 3% of the residents of Kiryas Joel were Israeli, 2% Romanian, 1% Polish, and 1% European.

The 2000 census also reported that 6.3% of village residents spoke only English at home, one of the lowest such percentages in the United States. 91.5% of residents spoke Yiddish at home, while 2.3% spoke Hebrew. Of the overall population in 2000, 46% spoke English "not well" or "not at all".

There were 2,229 households, out of which 79.5% had children under the age of 18 living with them, 93.2% were married couples living together, 1.6% had a female householder with no husband present, and 4.1% were non-families. 2.8% of all households were made up of individuals, and 2.1% had someone living alone who was 65 years of age or older. The average household size was 5.74, and the average family size was 5.84. In the village, the population was very young, with 57.5% under the age of 18, 17.2% from 18 to 24, 16.5% from 25 to 44, 7.2% from 45 to 64, and 1.6% who were 65 years of age or older. The median age was 15 years. For every 100 females, there were 116.3 males. For every 100 females age 18 and over, there were 118.0 males.

The village abides by strict Jewish customs, and its welcome sign, which was installed in 2010, asks visitors to dress conservatively and to "maintain gender separation in all public areas".

== Poverty and crime ==
The median income for a household in the village is $40,218, and the per capita income for the village is $12,114.

According to 2020 census figures, the village has a high poverty rate with about 40% of the residents living below the federal poverty line. A 2011 New York Times report noted that, despite the town's very high statistical poverty rates, "It has no slums or homeless people. No one who lives there is shabbily dressed or has to go hungry. Crime is virtually non-existent." The article goes on to note that there is a large network of self-funded social services within the community, which makes the official poverty statistics somewhat misleading. On the other hand, the parochial school system is funded by residents, not taxes, and employment in that system is a major cause of the low wages of many residents.

== Transportation ==
A bus sporting Transit Orange livery in neighboring Woodbury

Kiryas Joel has a very high rate of public transportation usage compared to other cities in the region. Local transit within the area is operated by the Village of Kiryas Joel Bus System, part of Transit Orange, and also has service to Manhattan and to the heavily Haredi Jewish-populated Williamsburg and Borough Park sections of Brooklyn.

== Events since 2000 ==
The main synagogue in Kiryas Joel

=== Growth ===
==== Friction with surrounding jurisdictions ====
The village has become a contentious issue in Orange County for several reasons, mainly related to its rapid growth. Unlike most other small communities, it lacks a real downtown and much of it is given over to residential property, which has mostly taken the form of contemporary townhouse-style condominiums. New construction is ongoing throughout the community.

Population growth in Kiryas Joel is strong. In 2005, the population had risen to 18,300. The 2010 census showed a population of 20,175, for a population growth rate of 53.6% between 2000 and 2010, which was less than anticipated, as it was projected that the population would double in that time period.

There are three religious tenets that drive our growth: Our women don't use birth control, they get married young, and after they get married, they stay in Kiryas Joel and start a family. Our growth comes simply from the fact that our families have a lot of babies, and we need to build homes to respond to the needs of our community.

— Gedalye Szegedin, village administrator, quoted in "Reverberations of a Baby Boom", by Fernanda Santos, The New York Times, 2006

==== Neighboring towns ====
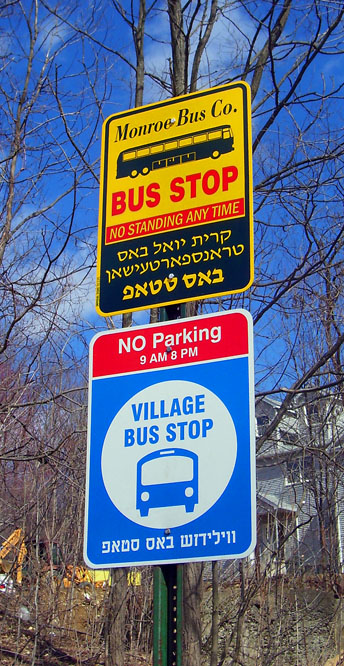
A bilingual bus stop sign in English and Yiddish. (Note: On the top sign, the Yiddish text is a transliteration of the English "Kiryas Joel Bus Transportation Bus Stop"; on the bottom, "Village Bus Stop".)

The Town of Monroe also contains two other villages – Monroe, and Harriman. Kiryas Joel's boundaries also come close to the neighboring towns of Blooming Grove and Woodbury.

Some residents of these communities and local Orange County politicians view the village as encroaching on them. Due to the rapid population growth in Kiryas Joel, resulting almost entirely from the high birth rates of its Hasidic population, the village government has undertaken various annexation efforts to expand its area, to the dismay of the majority of the residents of the surrounding communities. Many of these area residents see the expansion of the high-density residential-commercial village as a threat to the quality of life in the surrounding suburban communities, due to suburban sprawl. Other concerns of the surrounding communities are the impact on local aquifers and the projected increased volume of sewage reaching the county's sewerage treatment plants, already near capacity by 2005.

On August 11, 2006, residents of Woodbury voted, by a 3-to-1 margin, to incorporate much of the town as a village, to constrain further annexation. Kiryas Joel has opposed such moves in court.

In March 2007, the village of Kiryas Joel sued the county to stop it from selling off 1 million US gallons (3,800 m^{3}) of excess capacity at its sewage plant in Harriman. Two years earlier, the county had sued the village to stop its plans to tap into New York City's Catskill Aqueduct, arguing that the village's environmental review for the project had inadequately addressed concerns about the additional wastewater it would generate. The village was appealing an early ruling which sided with the county. In its action, Kiryas Joel accused the county of inconsistently claiming limited capacity in its suit when it is selling the million gallons to three communities outside its sewer district.

In 2017, the village proposed to settle a lawsuit proposed annexations by petitioning the county legislature to let it be the county's 21st town. It would be named Palm Tree, named after Joel Teitelbaum's last name which means palm tree. In return, the village would drop its request to annex 507 acres (205 ha). Plaintiffs United Monroe and Preserve Hudson Valley, agreed to withdraw their appeal of a decision allowing the annexation of a 164-acre (66 ha) parcel. The new town would be prohibited from filing annexation proposals or encouraging creating new villages for 10 years. Two-thirds of the county legislature must approve the creation of the new town, and a vote of Monroe residents may also be required. The referendum passed on November 7, 2017.

=== Local politics ===
Critics of the village cite its impact on local politics. Villagers are perceived as voting in a solid bloc. While this is not always the case, the highly concentrated population often does skew strongly toward one candidate or the other in local elections, making Kiryas Joel a heavily courted swing vote for whichever politician offers Kiryas Joel the most favorable environment for continued growth. In the hotly contested 2013 Town Supervisors race, the Kiryas Joel bloc vote elected Harley Doles to the position of town supervisor. Kiryas Joel then sought to annex 510 acres (210 ha) of land into their village and the new Monroe Town Board has had no comment on this issue. In late 2014 village leadership proposed alternatively that a new village, to be called Gilios Kiryas Joel, be created on the 1,140 acres (460 ha) south of the village within Monroe, including all the land it had wanted to annex.

Kiryas Joel played a major role in the 2006 Congressional election. The village was at that time in the congressional district represented by Republican Sue Kelly. Village residents had been loyal to Kelly in the past, but in 2006, voters were upset over what they saw as lack of adequate representation from Kelly for the village. In a bloc, Kiryas Joel swung around 2,900 votes to Kelly's Democratic opponent, John Hall. The vote in Kiryas Joel was one reason Hall carried the election, which he did by 4,800 votes.

In the 2020 presidential election, 98.5% of Kiryas Joel voters voted for Trump, one of the highest percentages in the country.

==== Internal friction ====
Joel Teitelbaum had no son, and thus no clear successor. His nephew, Moshe, was appointed by the community's committee members. But not all Satmar accepted Moses as the community leader, and even some of those who did questioned some of his actions and pronouncements. He responded by running the village in what they called an autocratic manner, through his deputy, Abraham Weider, who also served as mayor and president of the school board, as well as the main synagogue and yeshiva in the village.

In 1989, the village forbade any property owner from selling or renting an apartment without its permission. Teitelbaum elaborated that "anyone that rents without this permission has to be dealt with like a real murderer ... and he should be torn out from the roots".

In the early 1990s, the New York State Police responded many times to the village, which has a generally low crime rate otherwise, when self-described dissidents reported harassment such as broken windows and graffiti containing profanity on their property. In one incident, troopers rode a school bus undercover to catch teenage boys stoning it; the boys later stoned a back-up police cruiser when it arrived. One of Weider's nephews was among those arrested. He admitted that some of the village's young men took it upon themselves to act violently against dissidents because they could not bear to hear the grand rebbe criticized, although he said most of them were provoked to do so by dissidents.

"Someone not following breaks down the whole system of being able to educate and being able to bring up our children with strong family values", Weider told The New York Times in 1992. "Why do you think we have no drugs? If we lost respect for the Grand Rabbi, we lose the whole thing."

In January 1990, the village held its first, and, for a decade, only, school board election. "It's like this", Teitelbaum explained when he announced the names of seven hand-picked candidates. "With the power of the Torah, I am here the authority in the rabbinical leadership ... As you know, I want to nominate seven people, and I want these people to be the people."

One dissident, Joseph Waldman, decided nevertheless to run on his own. He was made unwelcome at the synagogue, his children were expelled from yeshiva, his car's tires slashed, and his windows broken. Several hundred residents marched in the streets in front of his house chanting, "Death to Joseph Waldman!", after posters calling for that fate were posted in the synagogue. After the election, in which Waldman finished last, but still won 673 votes, 60 families who were known to have voted for him were barred from visiting their fathers' graves in the village cemetery that was owned by the rabbi, and banned from the synagogue (also, at the time, the village's only polling place). Waldman compared Teitelbaum to Iran's Ayatollah Khomeini.

After the election, a state court ruled that Waldman's children had to be reinstated at the yeshiva, an action that was only taken after the judge held Teitelbaum in contempt and fined him personally. Friction continued as some of the dissidents banned from the synagogue circulated a petition calling for the polls to be moved to a neutral location. It originally drew 150 signatures, but all but 15 retracted their names after being threatened with excommunication by the grand rabbi, signing a document that they had not actually read the petition. One of the dissidents who signed was attacked while praying, and state troopers had to be called in again to disperse a mob that gathered on Waldman's lawn and broke his windows.

In November 2017, a local divorce mediator and an Israeli rabbi with ties to the village were involved in the planning of a contract killing on an estranged husband. They were sentenced to prison.

==== Electoral fraud allegations ====
On four occasions since 1990, the Middletown Times-Herald Record has run lengthy investigative articles on claims of electoral fraud in the village. A 1996 article found that Kiryas Joel residents who were students at yeshivas in Brooklyn had on many occasions apparently registered and voted in both the village and in Brooklyn; a year later, the paper reported that it had happened again. In 2001, absentee ballots were apparently cast by voters who did not normally reside in the village. In some cases, ballots were cast by people who seemed to reside in Antwerp, Belgium, without a set date of expected return, and, thus, would not be allowed under New York law to vote in any election for state or local office. That article led to a county grand jury investigation in 2001, which concluded that while procedures were not followed, and many mistakes were made, there was no evidence of deliberate intent to violate the law.

Before the 2013 Republican primary in that year's special election for the state assembly seat vacated by Annie Rabbitt, later elected county clerk, members of United Monroe, a local group that organizes and co-ordinates political opposition to the village and those local officials it believes support it, asked the county's Board of Elections to assign them to Kiryas Joel as election inspectors, who verify that voters are registered before allowing them to vote. The board's Democratic commissioner, Sue Bahrens, initially agreed to appoint six to serve in the village, but later reversed that decision. The six sued the county, alleging religious discrimination; the county responded that they had no standing to sue. Village Manager Gedalye Szegedin said the citizens were entitled to have inspectors who spoke Yiddish and understood their culture and customs. A state court justice dismissed the discrimination claim, but ruled that the United Monroe inspectors had been dismissed arbitrarily and capriciously, and were entitled to their appointments, but did not say when or where.

In 2014, the newspaper examined claims by poll watchers from United Monroe that they were intimidated and harassed by other poll watchers sympathetic to the village government when they tried to challenge voters whose signatures did not initially appear to match those on file during the previous year's elections for county offices. They further alleged that election inspectors in the polling place, a banquet hall where 6,000 residents voted, sometimes gave the voters ballots before the signatures could be checked.

Some of the United Monroe poll watchers claimed that Langdon Chapman, an attorney for the Monroe town board, which they believe is controlled by members deferential to Kiryas Joel and its interests, was one of those who intimidated them. Coleman told the Record that while he had been at the banquet hall in question, he had only insisted that poll watchers state the reason for their challenges, as legally required, and had left after two hours. He was subsequently appointed county attorney (the lawyer who represents the county in civil matters) by new county executive Steve Neuhaus, whose margin of victory included all but 20 of the votes from the village.

After the election, United Monroe members found more than 800 voters in Kiryas Joel whose signatures did not match those on file, in addition to 25 they had challenged at the polls, three of whom were later investigated by the county sheriff; the rest were considered unfounded. Orange County District Attorney David Hoovler, elected along with Neuhaus, told the newspaper it was difficult to investigate the allegations, since they could not verify the identity of either signer, if, in fact, there were two. The Record attempted to contact some of those voters; the only one they reached hung up when asked about the election.

=== Large families ===
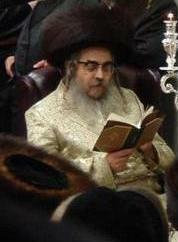
Grand Rabbi Aaron Teitelbaum, celebrating Hanukah in the main synagogue in Kiryas Joel

Women in Kiryas Joel usually stop working outside the home after the birth of a second child. Most families have only one income, and many children. The resulting poverty rate makes a disproportionate number of families in Kiryas Joel eligible for welfare benefits, when compared to the rest of the county. The New York Times wrote,

Because of the sheer size of the families (the average household here has six people, but it is not uncommon for couples to have 8 or 10 children), and because a vast majority of households subsist on only one salary, 62 percent of the local families live below poverty level and rely heavily on public assistance, which is another sore point among those who live in neighboring communities.

A 60-bed post-natal maternal care center was built with $10 million in state and federal grants. Mothers can recuperate there for two weeks away from their large families.

==== Hepatitis A and vaccine trial ====
In the 1990s, the first clinical trials for the hepatitis A vaccine took place in Kiryas Joel, where 70 percent of residents had been affected. This disproportionate rate of hepatitis A infection was due in part to Kiryas Joel's high birth rate and crowded conditions among children, who bathed together in pools and ate from communal food at school. Children who were not infected with hepatitis A were separated into two groups, one receiving the experimental vaccine and the other receiving a placebo injection. Based on this study, the vaccine was declared 100 percent effective. Merck licensed the vaccine in 1995, and it became available in 1996, after which the hepatitis A infection rate fell by 75 percent in the United States.

=== Litigation ===
The unusual lifestyle and growth pattern of Kiryas Joel has led to litigation on a number of fronts. In 1994, the Supreme Court ruled in the case of Board of Education of Kiryas Joel Village School District v. Grumet that the Kiryas Joel School District, which covered only the village, was designed in violation of the Establishment Clause of the First Amendment, because the design accommodated one group on the basis of religious affiliation. Subsequently, the New York State Legislature established a similar school district in the village that has passed legal muster. Further litigation has resulted over what entity should pay for the education of children with disabilities in Kiryas Joel, and over whether the community's boys must ride buses driven by women.

In 2011, a case (Kiryas Joel Alliance v. Village of Kiryas Joel) against the village was heard in federal district court; the plaintiffs, who were followers of competing factions of Satmar to Rebbe Aron Teitelbaum's, argued that the control of the village government by the Aronite faction's supporters was being abused to discriminate against them. The case was dismissed, and in 2012 the Second Circuit rejected their appeal of the dismissal.

== Education ==
Most students go to private religious schools; in 2021 there were about 12,000 students attending them. In 2020, the area had nearly two dozen such schools. In 1994 Kiryas Joel had 5,000 children in the K-12 level with the majority going to private yeshivas and about 200 going to the public special education school.

The public Kiryas Joel School District has a school for special education students. Before 1985, special education students were taught by public school teachers in separate classes within yeshivas, and between 1985 and 1989 special education students were taught in Monroe–Woodbury Central School District facilities. In 2022–2023, the school district had a public school enrollment of 165 students.

== In media ==
The village is explored in the 2018 documentary City of Joel.

== See also ==
- New Square, New York − an all-Hasidic village in a neighboring county
- Kaser, New York − an all-Hasidic village in a neighboring county
- Williamsburg, Brooklyn − large hasidic community center, primarily of Satmar Hasidim
- Borough Park, Brooklyn − large hasidic community center
- Crown Heights, Brooklyn − large hasidic community center
- Bloomingburg, New York − Hasidic community village in development, in a neighboring county
- Kiryas Tosh, Quebec − an all-Hasidic community in Quebec, Canada
- Qırmızı Qəsəbə
- Shtetl
- South Blooming Grove, New York − adjacent community formed to stop the expansion of Kiryas Joel, that nevertheless received a large influx of the Hasidic community
