= Monroe–Woodbury Central School District =

School district in the U.S. state of New York

Address
- 278 Route 32 Central Valley, New York, 10917; United States

District information
- Type: Public
- Grades: K–12
- NCES District ID: 3619650

Students and staff
- Students: 6,802 (2020–2021)
- Teachers: 496.25 (on an FTE basis)
- Staff: 361.01 (on an FTE basis)
- Student–teacher ratio: 13.71:1

Other information
- Website: www.mw.k12.ny.us

The Monroe–Woodbury Central School District (MWCSD) is a school district in Orange County, New York. Most students in the school district live in the towns of Monroe or Woodbury, hence the name. However, there are some students in the district that live in either Harriman, Highland Mills, Central Valley, Chester, Blooming Grove, or Tuxedo.

The district includes Monroe Village, most of Woodsbury, Harriman, Walton Park, and a portion of South Blooming Grove. The town of Monroe and portions of the towns of Blooming Grove, Chester, Tuxedo, and Woodbury are in the district boundaries.

== History ==
In 1985 the district assumed responsibility of special education students in the Hasidic community of Kiryas Joel after the United States Supreme Court stated in 1985 that public school instruction cannot be done within an active religious school's facilities; previously Kiryas Joel students were educated in yeshivas by tax-supported public school teachers. Orthodox Jewish parents complained about discrimination against their children by other students at MWCSD and advocated for creating a special school district covering Kiryas Joel, made up entirely of Orthodox Jewish people. In 1989 the Kiryas Joel School District was created for special education in Kiryas Joel.

In 2016 the school board okayed transferring 164 acres (66 ha) of land from the Monroe-Woodbury district to the Kiryas Joel district. The school board of Monroe-Woodbury would then have to decide, and upon that confirmation the transfer would be complete. In 2017 all board members of Monroe-Woodbury approved the boundary change.

In 2023 the school district contemplated the inclusion of Islamic holidays in its academic calendar. The initiative was to recognize Eid al-Fitr and Eid al-Adha as official school holidays. A petition advocating for this change received over 200 signatures from the Monroe-Woodbury Islamic Center, and was presented to the district. The calendar for the 2023-2024 school year has already been decided, and ongoing discussions indicate a positive outlook for the inclusion of these holidays in future academic years.

== Student body ==
In 1994 the district had 5,500 students. Joseph Berger of The New York Times wrote that they were "from largely secular backgrounds".

As of 2021 the Monroe–Woodbury Central School District serves a diverse student body of more than 7,400 students annually in kindergarten through grade 12. The district comprises several elementary, middle, and high schools. The student body at the schools served by Monroe–Woodbury Central School District is 43.8% White, 9.4% Black, 6.8% Asian or Asian/Pacific Islander, 36.6% Hispanic/Latino, and 3.2% of students are two or more races. In addition, 33.4% of students are eligible to participate in the federal free and reduced price meal program and 4.1% of students are English language learners. The district’s minority enrollment is 60%. The student-to-teacher ratio is 14:1. The district is committed to nurturing a partnership between the schools and the community. The decisions made by the elected school board affect the education of M-W children and, therefore, the well-being of the community.

== Schools ==
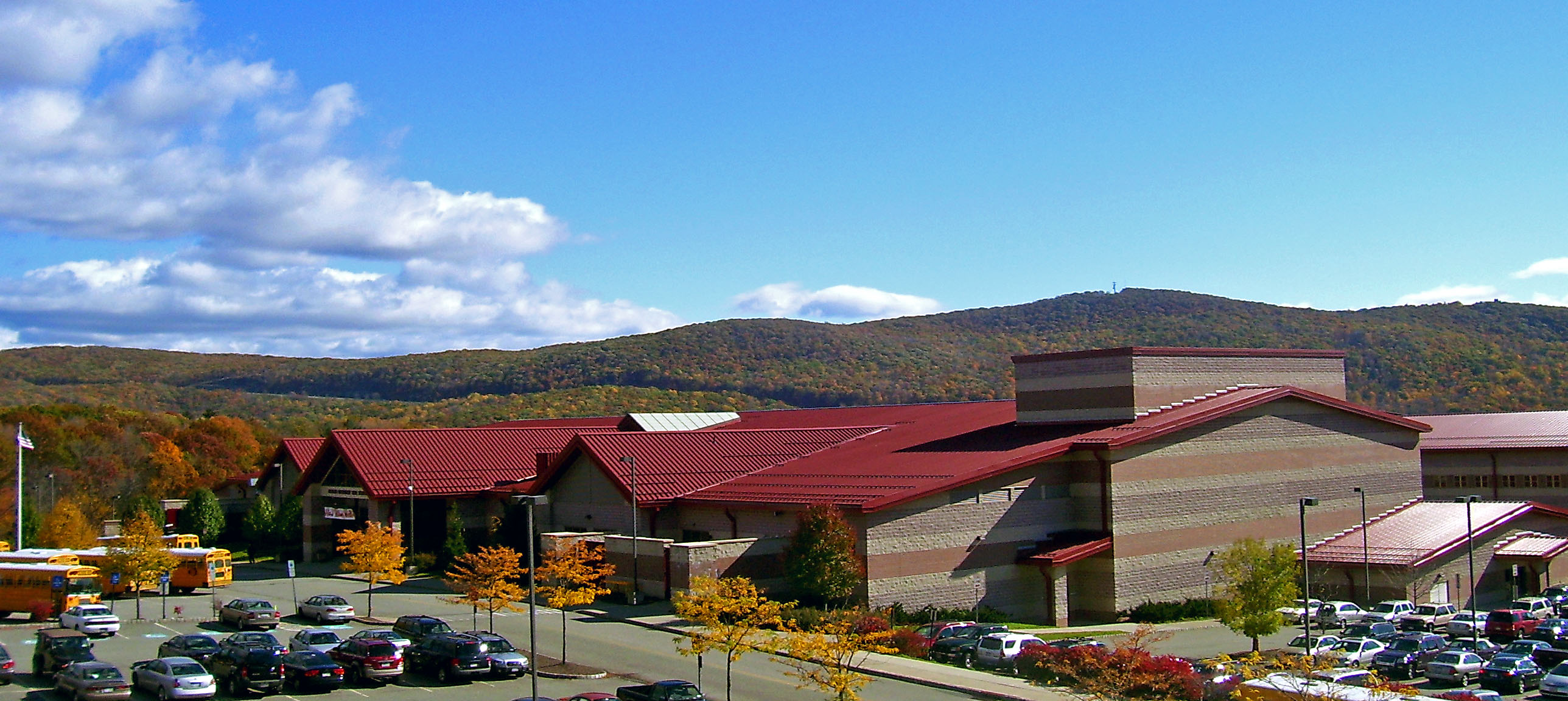
The high school

The district's schools consist of 7 learning facilities. Sapphire Elementary & Smith Clove serve children (grades kindergarten-1). Central Valley, North Main, and Pine Tree elementary schools (grades 2–5), and Monroe-Woodbury Middle School (grades 6–8) and Monroe-Woodbury High School (grades 9–12) are the higher level buildings in the district. There are four houses in the Middle School, named Yellow, Green, Red and Blue, as well as 4 in the high school, named A, B, C, and D.

=== Extracurricular ===
The Monroe-Woodbury school colors are purple, black, and white. The mascot is a mounted Crusader bearing a lance and shield. The Crusader represents the strength and spirit of determination that both the students and faculty of the district possess. The schools have many sports, including cross country, track and field, football, soccer, swimming, basketball, baseball, softball, hockey, lacrosse, volleyball, and more. The district also has a large variety of extra-curricular activities available to its student body. The only international activity the district is involved in is Odyssey of the Mind. Other extra-curricular activities include Athletic Club, Chess Club, Computer Club, Drama Club, FBLA, History Club, Model UN, Mock Trial, Interact, SADD, Student Council/Government, NHS, STARS, The Wire News, and LEAD.
