= Wallkill, Ulster County, New York =

Wallkill
- CDP
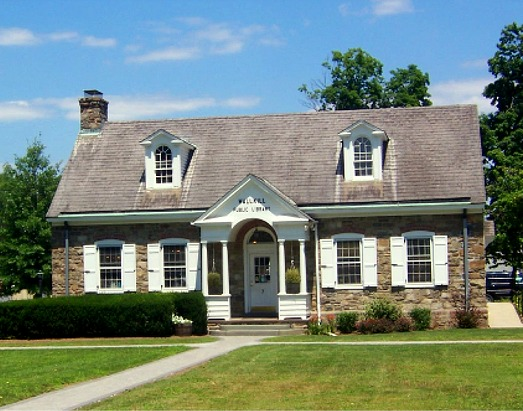
- Wallkill Public Library

- Location in Ulster County and the state of New York
- Coordinates: 41°36′20″N 74°11′02″W
- Country: United States
- State: New York
- County: Ulster

Area
  - Total: 3.1 sq mi (8.0 km^{2})
  - Land: 3.1 sq mi (8.0 km^{2})

Population (2020)
  - Total: 2,166
  - Density: 700/sq mi (270/km^{2})
- Time zone: UTC-5 (Eastern (EST))
  - Summer (DST): UTC-4 (EDT)
- ZIP Code: 12589
- Area code: 845
- GNIS feature ID: 968702

Wallkill is a hamlet (and census-designated place), generally identified as coterminous with ZIP Code 12589, telephone exchange 895 in the 845 area code and most of the Wallkill Central School District located mostly in the eastern half of the town of Shawangunk, Ulster County, New York, United States, but partly spilling over into adjacent regions of the Orange County towns of Newburgh and Montgomery. The population was 2,166 at the 2020 census.

The Wallkill and Shawangunk correctional facilities are located in Wallkill. The hamlet's attractions include the Walden–Wallkill Rail Trail, the original Borden Farm (namesake for the area's middle school, John G. Borden Middle School), the Wallkill River, the Magnanini Winery, and for its proximity to the Shawangunk Mountains.

== History ==
Before European settlement, this area was populated by the Munsee branch of the Lenape (Delaware) people, who occupied the upper Delaware Valley, the adjacent Catskill foothills, and most of what is now the state of New York south of the Catskills, as well as northern New Jersey (Kraft 2001). The Waronawanka (Waranawankong), known to history as the Esopus Indians, were the Munsee tribe present in the region of the Shawangunk Grasslands Refuge. They inhabited the Rondout-Wallkill Valleys/Shawangunk Mountain region southward to their boundary with the Murderer's Kill Indians (Moodna Creek, near Cornwall) and southwestward along the Shawangunks to their border with the Minisink tribe, near where present Interstate 84 crosses the ridge in western Orange County (Fried 2005).

A number of Indian tribes served as mediators between the Esopus and the Dutch during the Esopus Wars, including not only nearby tribes such as the Mohicans and Wappingers, but also the Mohawks, Senecas and Hackensack Indians, whose proximity to the major Dutch settlements at Fort Orange and New Amsterdam made them useful to both sides (Fried 1975). In 1664, a peace treaty ended the final conflict with the now impoverished Esopus Indians. Later the same year, the Dutch lost their North American colonies to the English. By 1684, the Esopus tribe had sold most of their ancestral lands to the colonies, though many Indians continued living on portions of the land until settlers actually took possession during succeeding decades.

The Lenape population had been ravaged not only by war, but by European diseases for which they had no natural immunity. The last known sale of land by an Esopus Indian in Ulster County occurred in 1770 (Fried 2005). The refuge itself lies close to two sites of great historic interest; only a mile to the west, the Esopus tribe had a major village on the Shawangunk Kill that was the scene of a dramatic battle and rescue of prisoners by Dutch forces in 1663, during the Second Esopus War.

Wallkill is also a destination for international visitors to Watchtower Farms, which draws tens of thousands each year to a free guided tour of its printery. The Watchtower Society (a legal entity of Jehovah's Witnesses) has operated the facility since 1963, initially to produce food cost-effectively for volunteer workers at its offices and printeries in Brooklyn, New York. Some printing of Awake! and The Watchtower began at Wallkill in 1973, and by 2004 their entire United States printing operation was shifted from Brooklyn to an expanded Wallkill printery. The Watchtower printery at Wallkill is considered an example in automated printing, binding, and packaging. Aside from those run for the federal government, Watchtower's Wallkill plant is the largest in-plant printing operation in the United States.

The Walstein Childs House, J. B. Crowell and Son Brick Mould Mill Complex, Andries DuBois House, and Reformed Dutch Church of New Hurley are listed on the National Register of Historic Places.

== Geography ==
Wallkill is located at 41°36′N 74°10′W (41.61, -74.18). According to the United States Census Bureau, the CDP has a total area of 3.1 square miles (8.0 km^{2}), all land.

The Wallkill River flows north past the hamlet.

== Demographics ==
Historical population
Census	Pop.	Note	%±
1960	1,215		—
1970	1,849		52.2%
1980	2,064		11.6%
1990	2,125		3.0%
2000	2,143		0.8%
2010	2,228		4.0%
2020	2,166		−2.8%

As of the census of 2000, there were 2,143 people, 788 households, and 556 families residing in the CDP. The population density was 697.3 inhabitants per square mile (269.2/km^{2}). There were 825 housing units at an average density of 268.5 per square mile (103.7/km^{2}). The racial makeup of the CDP was 95.01% White, 2.19% African American, 0.14% Native American, 0.98% Asian, 0.56% from other races, and 1.12% from two or more races. Hispanic or Latino of any race were 4.15% of the population.

There were 788 households, out of which 39.0% had children under the age of 18 living with them, 57.7% were married couples living together, 7.6% had a female householder with no husband present, and 29.4% were non-families. 25.4% of all households were made up of individuals, and 9.3% had someone living alone who was 65 years of age or older. The average household size was 2.72 and the average family size was 3.26.

In the CDP, the population was spread out, with 28.9% under the age of 18, 8.0% from 18 to 24, 30.8% from 25 to 44, 22.4% from 45 to 64, and 9.8% who were 65 years of age or older. The median age was 35 years. For every 100 females, there were 97.5 males. For every 100 females age 18 and over, there were 97.3 males.

The median income for a household in the CDP was $47,604, and the median income for a family was $58,704. Males had a median income of $44,792 versus $26,786 for females. The per capita income for the CDP was $19,258. About 3.6% of families and 5.0% of the population were below the poverty line, including 4.2% of those under age 18 and none of those age 65 or over.

== Education ==
The CDP is in Wallkill Central School District.
