= Harriman, New York =

- Village
- Village of Harriman
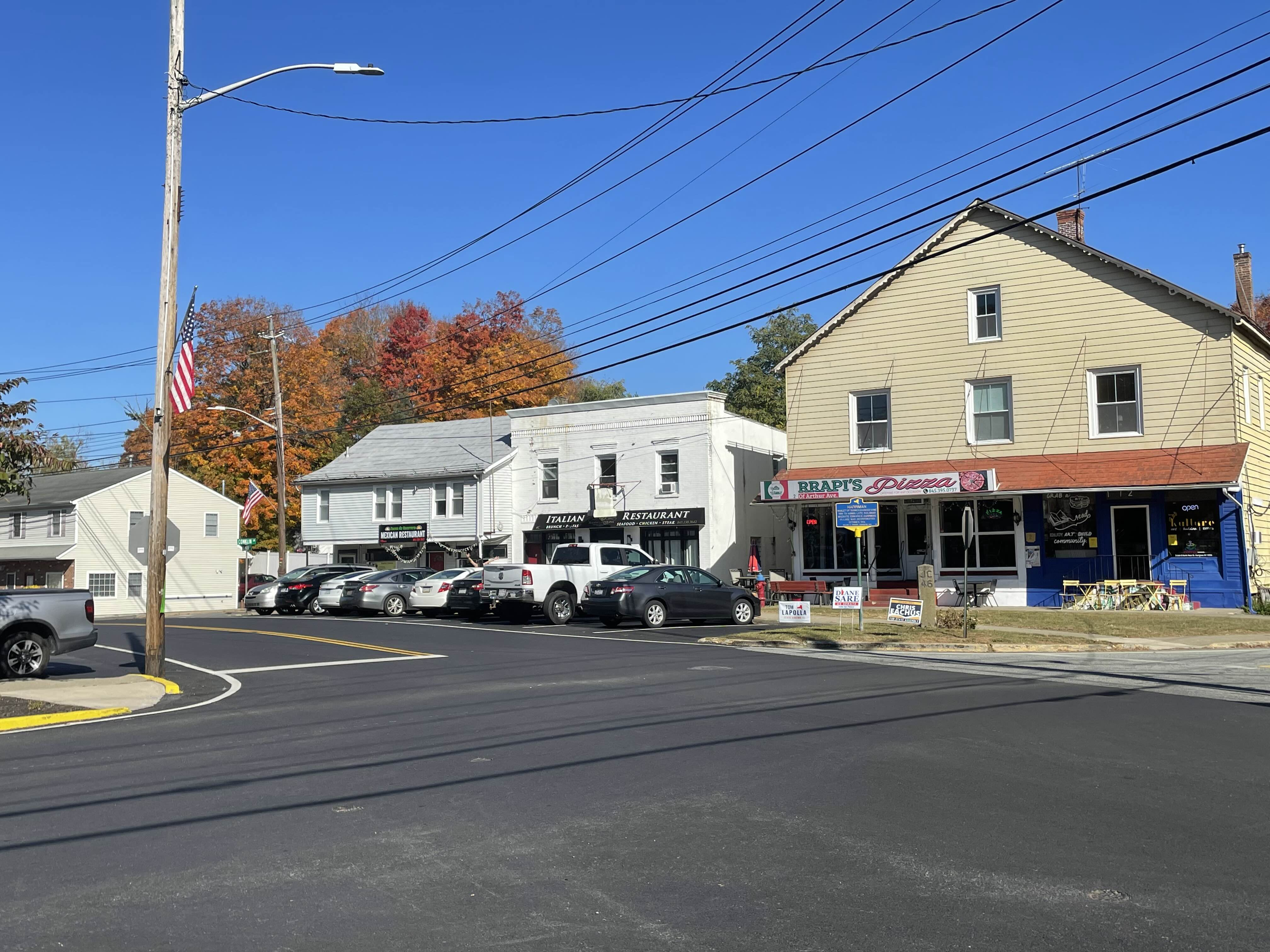
- Harriman Square

- Location in Orange County and the state of New York.

- Location within the state of New York Harriman (the United States)
- Coordinates: 41°18′30″N 74°8′50″W
- Country: United States
- State: New York
- County: Orange

Area
  - Total: 1.02 sq mi (2.65 km^{2})
  - Land: 1.00 sq mi (2.60 km^{2})
  - Water: 0.019 sq mi (0.05 km^{2})
- Elevation: 538 ft (164 m)

Population (2020)
  - Total: 2,714
  - Density: 2,702.1/sq mi (1,043.28/km^{2})
- Time zone: UTC-5 (Eastern (EST))
  - Summer (DST): UTC-4 (EDT)
- ZIP code: 10926
- Area code: 845
- FIPS code: 36-32325
- GNIS feature ID: 0952253
- Website: www.villageofharriman.gov

Harriman is a village in Orange County, New York, United States. It is in the southeastern section of the town of Monroe, with a small portion in the town of Woodbury. The population was 2,714 at the 2020 census. It is part of the Kiryas Joel–Poughkeepsie–Newburgh metropolitan area as well as the larger New York metropolitan area.

== History ==
The village is named after E. H. Harriman, former president of the Union Pacific railroad, whose estate — Arden — is adjacent to the village. Previously, the village was known as Turner, from the early restaurant of Peter Turner.

=== Charles Minot's achievement ===
In 1851, Erie Railroad executive Charles Minot was waiting in a train parked at Turner Station, until seeing the new telegraph wires next to the tracks. He ran into the station and wired to Monroe, to see if the eastbound train had passed them already, to which they responded no. Minot then ordered the train engineer to proceed to Goshen, but he refused. Instead of giving up, Minot got into the cab and drove the train himself to Goshen, then all the way to Port Jervis, hours ahead of schedule. Minot's way of communication was a first for the railroad industry at the time, which prompted a monument to be erected in 1912 along with a large ceremony, with many notable people attending such as the Erie president Frederick Underwood, Mrs. Harriman and more. In the 1980s, the bronze tablet on the monument was briefly removed by Conrail for "preservation purposes" but was placed back after community backlash. The tablet was then stolen again by an unknown party and has yet to be returned. It is unknown whether Conrail removed it again or if it was stolen.

=== Railroad service in Harriman ===
In 1838, Peter Turner had constructed a large train depot named the Orange Hotel. It was 3 stories tall, with a large dining hall and lavish rooms. It sat along the train tracks for the New York & Erie Railroad and was a fairly popular place for people to stop. But on December 26, 1873, the hotel caught fire in the attic. Due to a lack of fire suppression equipment in the area, it was unable to be extinguished, and the building completely collapsed within half an hour.

The station was replaced with a small depot until in 1909, when Mary Harriman (widow of E. H. Harriman) donated land farther south to build a new station, since the shack was on the verge of collapse. In 1910, with the death of E. H. Harriman, the Turner Village Improvement Association proposed renaming Turner to Harriman. The association voted 58 to 13 to change the name. The village was divided on this matter, with one church putting up a banner reading "LONG LIVE TURNER," with the village responding by tearing it down. After this controversy had subsided, work began on the new station depot. With $6,000 donated from Harriman's widow, the station was much better designed, with a style that closely matched Tuxedo's station to the south.

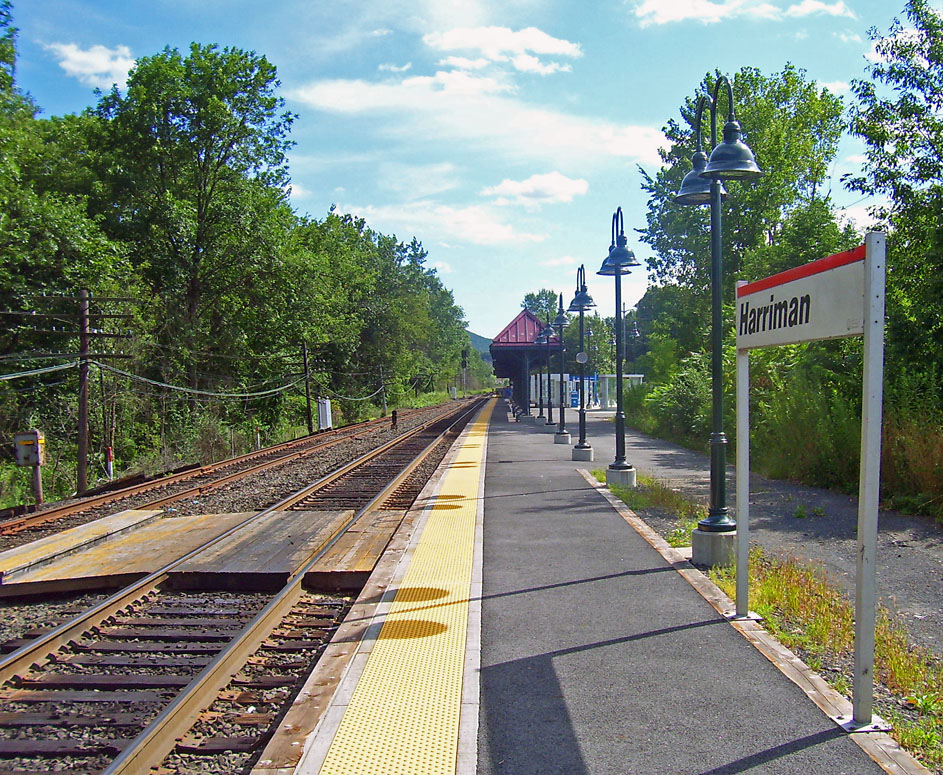
The new Harriman station on the Port Jervis Line

The new station served the Erie Railroad for decades, until its bankruptcy, where service was transitioned into the newly formed Erie Lackawanna Railway, then into Conrail only 16 years later, and finally the Metro-North Railroad. By the 1980s the station was boarded up and train service had been transitioned onto the present day route, with a new station being constructed south of Harriman on Route 17. The station remained decaying until 2006 where the Harriman building inspectors told Norfolk Southern Railway (the current owners of the land it stood on) to either refurbish the station or tear it down, which the railroad chose the latter. Presently, the former railroad from River Road, Harriman to East Main Street, Middletown has been converted into a 19.5 mile long shared-use path named the Heritage Trail.

== Geography ==
According to the United States Census Bureau, the village has a total area of 1.0 square mile (2.6 km^{2}), of which 1.0 square mile (2.6 km^{2}) is land and 1.00% is water.

== Demographics ==
Historical population
Census	Pop.	Note	%±
1920	680		—
1930	657		−3.4%
1940	703		7.0%
1950	676		−3.8%
1960	752		11.2%
1970	955		27.0%
1980	796		−16.6%
1990	2,288		187.4%
2000	2,252		−1.6%
2010	2,424		7.6%
2020	2,714		12.0%
U.S. Decennial Census

=== 2020 census ===
As of the 2020 census, Harriman had a population of 2,714. The median age was 37.9 years. 22.9% of residents were under the age of 18 and 12.0% of residents were 65 years of age or older. For every 100 females there were 87.4 males, and for every 100 females age 18 and over there were 81.3 males age 18 and over.

98.9% of residents lived in urban areas, while 1.1% lived in rural areas.

There were 1,051 households in Harriman, of which 38.2% had children under the age of 18 living in them. Of all households, 39.0% were married-couple households, 16.6% were households with a male householder and no spouse or partner present, and 36.9% were households with a female householder and no spouse or partner present. About 26.5% of all households were made up of individuals and 11.9% had someone living alone who was 65 years of age or older.

There were 1,107 housing units, of which 5.1% were vacant. The homeowner vacancy rate was 1.7% and the rental vacancy rate was 3.6%.

Racial composition as of the 2020 census
Race	Number	Percent
White	1,247	45.9%
Black or African American	495	18.2%
American Indian and Alaska Native	9	0.3%
Asian	258	9.5%
Native Hawaiian and Other Pacific Islander	5	0.2%
Some other race	364	13.4%
Two or more races	336	12.4%
Hispanic or Latino (of any race)	783	28.9%

=== 2010 census ===
As of the census of 2010, there was a total population of 2,424 people, consisting of 1,177 males, making up 48.6% and 1,247 females, at 51.4%. There was a 7.6% increase in total population over the past decade. The median resident age was 37.1 years old. The estimated median household income in 2009 was $68,731, with an estimated per capita income of 37,795.

White resident population recorded: 1,621 Black or African American resident population recorded: 325 American Indian and Alaska native resident population recorded: 18 Asian resident population recorded: 251 Native Hawaiian and other Pacific Islander resident population recorded: 1 Hispanic or Latino of any race resident population recorded: 439 Resident population of some other race recorded: 125 Resident population of two or more races recorded: 83

== Parks and recreation ==
Harriman State Park, located east of the village, is the second largest state park in New York State.

== Education ==
Public education is administered by the Monroe-Woodbury Central School District. Sapphire Elementary School is located in Harriman.

== Infrastructure ==
=== Transportation ===
Highways include:

- New York State Thruway (I-87
- New York State Route 17
- New York State Route 17M
- US Route 6

Transit Orange provides Dial-A-Ride bus service.

Commuter rail service is available at Harriman station on the Port Jervis Line of the Metro-North Railroad. An older stop served the Erie Railroad main line until 1983.
