= Woodbury, Orange County, New York =

Woodbury, New York
- Town and village
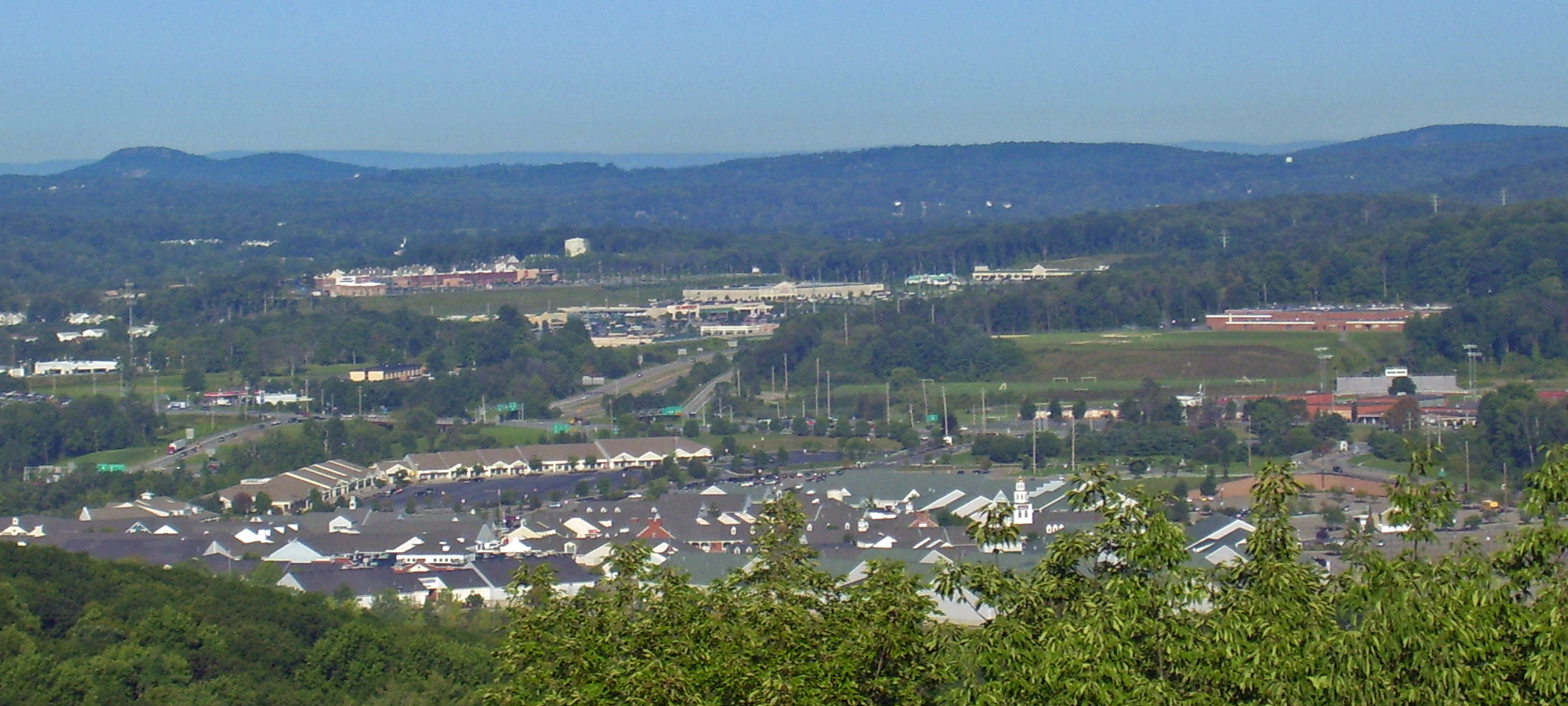
- Woodbury Common Premium Outlets

- Location in Orange County and the state of New York.
- Coordinates: 41°20′54″N 74°07′31″W
- Country: United States
- State: New York
- Region: Hudson Valley
- County: Orange
- Founded: 1889

Government
  - Supervisor: Jacqueline Hernandez (D)

Area
  - Total: 37.2 sq mi (96 km^{2})
  - Land: 36.2 sq mi (94 km^{2})
  - Water: 1.0 sq mi (2.6 km^{2})
- Elevation: 500 ft (150 m)

Population (2020)
  - Total: 12,197
  - Density: 337/sq mi (130/km^{2})
- Website: Town of Woodbury

Woodbury is a town and village in Orange County, New York, United States. The town population was 12,197 at the 2020 census. The village was incorporated in 2006 and comprises all of the town that is not part of the village of Harriman. The region was once called Woodbury Clove. It is part of the Kiryas Joel-Poughkeepsie-Newburgh metropolitan area as well as the larger New York metropolitan area. Woodbury is in the southeastern part of Orange County. The town also has four schools, which are part of the Monroe-Woodbury Central school District.

== History ==
The region was once called Woodbury Clove ("valley"), and not to be confused with Woodbury, Nassau County, Long Island, New York.

The town of Woodbury (which comprises the hamlets of Central Valley and Highland Mills) and the area formerly known as the hamlet of Woodbury Falls was officially created on December 19, 1889, by an act of the Orange County Board of Supervisors. The first town meeting was held on March 4 the following year, with John A. Patterson presiding as supervisor. The second supervisor was James Seaman. Even though the land is no longer used for farming, the Seaman family property can still be identified by a sign which reads “Sweet Clover Farm” along Route 32 at the northern end of town. This is now the home of Palaia Vineyards.

This was the second time this town was created; the first was in 1863, when the Board of Supervisors approved the division of Monroe into the three communities of Monroe, Southfields and Highland. The Highland portion was what would become Woodbury in 1889. Objections to this arose, and two years later the legislature was asked to overrule the board's decision; it did, by recreating the old town of Monroe. In 1889 the Board of Supervisors reinstated the original separation, and the town now known as Woodbury was reformed.

Woodbury had undergone numerous geographic and name changes prior to its incorporation in 1889. Until 1764, the area was part of an enlarged Goshen. Goshen was then divided into two parts, with Woodbury becoming part of Cornwall. During the American Revolution, the area was shown on maps as Woodbury Clove. By 1799 Cornwall was also divided, with Woodbury joining present-day Monroe and Tuxedo to become the town of Cheesekook. This name was changed to Smithfield (or Southfield) and in 1808 became Monroe (supposedly in honor of newly elected US president James Monroe; however, Thomas Jefferson was president in 1808. James Monroe served from 1817 to 1825, and some believe Monroe was named for a local family).

The derivation of the name “Woodbury" is uncertain. Some say it may have come from the Dutch word wode for "wood", meaning "a dwelling place in the woods". Others claim that the many English families who settled here bestowed the name of a famous English family named Woodbury upon the area. As for the hamlets, Central Valley and Highland Mills were once called Lower Smith's Clove ("clove" meaning valley). Highland Mills was also known as Orange Post Office but the residents changed it in 1824, with the present name most likely reflecting the water and flour mills and tannery businesses in the area. A map dated about 1790 shows Woodbury Falls as Smithfields. It may have later taken its name from the once-lovely falls there. The first Cuban president, Thomas Estrada Palma, lived in Central Valley and Estrada Road was named in his honor.

In addition to flour and grist mills, the area's industry was dominated by tourism and fly rod (fishing rod) manufacturing businesses; Woodbury was home to the Payne and Leonard Rod Companies.

The town's major attraction is Woodbury Common Premium Outlets – one of the largest outlet malls in the world, visited by people from Japan, China, Europe and the Americas. The shopping boom in the area (which began in the 1980s) has inspired construction projects including Wal-Mart, Home Depot, BJ's Wholesale Club, many chain restaurants, car dealerships, other retailers and proposed projects. This has caused conflict and controversy with local residents and surrounding municipalities. Orange County is prospering from the tax revenue this area produces; however, commuting on Route 32 during peak holiday shopping days is extremely irritating to local residents. The NYS Department of Transportation is currently undertaking a $30 million project to redirect traffic flow, attempting to ease the unsafe conditions arising on peak shopping weekends.

On August 10, 2006, residents voted by a 4½-to-1 ratio to create the village of Woodbury. The village incorporates all the town's land, except for a small portion of the village of Harriman which lies within the town of Woodbury.

Most Woodbury residents have either a Central Valley, NY 10917 address or a Highland Mills, NY 10930 address (Woodbury, NY 11797 is for Woodbury, Nassau County, Long Island, NY).

== Geography ==
According to the United States Census Bureau, the town has a total area of 37.2 square miles (96 km^{2}), of which 36.2 square miles (94 km^{2}) is land and 1.0 square mile (2.6 km^{2}) (2.72%) is water.

The town is west of West Point, the United States Military Academy. Interstate 87, NY-17 (future Interstate 86), NY-32, and US Route 6 pass through the town.

Schunnemunk Mountain defines part of the western town line.

== Demographics ==
Historical population
Census	Pop.	Note	%±
1890	1,528		—
1900	1,666		9.0%
1910	2,216		33.0%
1920	1,885		−14.9%
1930	1,923		2.0%
1940	1,960		1.9%
1950	2,138		9.1%
1960	2,887		35.0%
1970	4,660		61.4%
1980	6,494		39.4%
1990	8,236		26.8%
2000	9,456		14.8%
2010	11,353		20.1%
2020	12,197		7.4%
U.S. Decennial Census

As of the 2000 census there were 9,460 people, 3,117 households, and 2,546 families residing in the town. The population density was 261.6 inhabitants per square mile (101.0/km^{2}). There were 3,358 housing units, with an average density of 92.9 per square mile (35.9/km^{2}). The racial makeup of the town was 90.18% Caucasian, 3.03% African-American, .29% Native American, 2.6% Asian, .02% Pacific Islander, 2.21% from other races and 1.67% of two or more races. Hispanics or Latinos (of any race) were 7.94% of the population.

There were 3,117 households, of which 46.7% had children under the age of 18 living with them; 69.9% were married couples living together; 8.9% had a female householder with no husband present and 18.3% were non-family units. 15.0% of all households were made up of individuals; 4.8% had someone living alone who was 65 years of age or older. The average household size was 3.03, and the average family size was 3.39.

The age of the population was diverse, with 30.9% under age 18; 5.8% from 18 to 24; 31.4% from 25 to 44; 24.5% from 45 to 64 and 7.4% who were age 65 or older. The median age was 36. For every 100 females, there were 96.5 males. For every 100 females age 18 and over, there were 92.7 males.

The median income for a household in the town was $79,087, and the median income for a family was $84,156. Males had a median income of $59,744, versus $37,695 for females. Per capita income for the town was $28,566. About 1.8% of families (3.3% of the population) were below the poverty line, including 3.1% of those under age 18 and 1.6% of those age 65 or over.

== Communities and locations in Woodbury ==
- Central Valley – A current hamlet south of Highland Mills on NY-32
- Coronet Lake – A small lake, partly in the town at the southwestern town line
- Cromwell Lake – A small lake, northwest of Central Valley
- Highland Mills – A current hamlet, west of Interstate 87 on NY-32
- Harriman – A village, part of which is on the southern town line at the junction of Interstate 87 and NY-17 lies within Woodbury (remaining part lies within Monroe)
- Lebanon – A former hamlet in the western part of Woodbury, on Shunnemunk Mountain
- Newburgh Junction – A former hamlet, at the southern tip of the town on NY-17
- Thevenet Hall – A location at the western town line
- Woodbury – The former hamlet of Woodbury is north of Highland Mills, on NY-32

The now-defunct hamlet of Queensboro is also listed in the official New York State Gazetteer, maintained and published by the New York State Department of Health, which includes numerous defunct hamlets and towns, some with alternate or archaic spellings.

== Political representation ==
Woodbury is located in the 18th Congressional District of New York and is represented by Representative Patrick Ryan

In state government the Village is located in the 39th Senatorial District and represented by James Skoufis (D - Cornwall), and in the 99th State Assembly District is represented by Christopher Eachus. Skoufis' election in 2012, marked the first time since 1984, that Woodbury was represented by a Democrat in the Assembly and the first time since 1930 a Woodbury resident has served in the Assembly.

The community is split into three county legislative districts: the 1st District, represented by Michael Amo (I-Woodbury) (Amo switched from the Republican to the Independence Party in 2007); the 5th District, represented by Katherine Bonelli (R-Blooming Grove) and the 14th District, represented by Laurie Tautel (D-Highlands).

The town is divided into ten election districts, each of which elects two enrolled individuals from the Republican, Democratic and Conservative parties to represent those enrolled voters in the three parties at local and county party caucuses.

== Town and village officials ==
=== Town ===
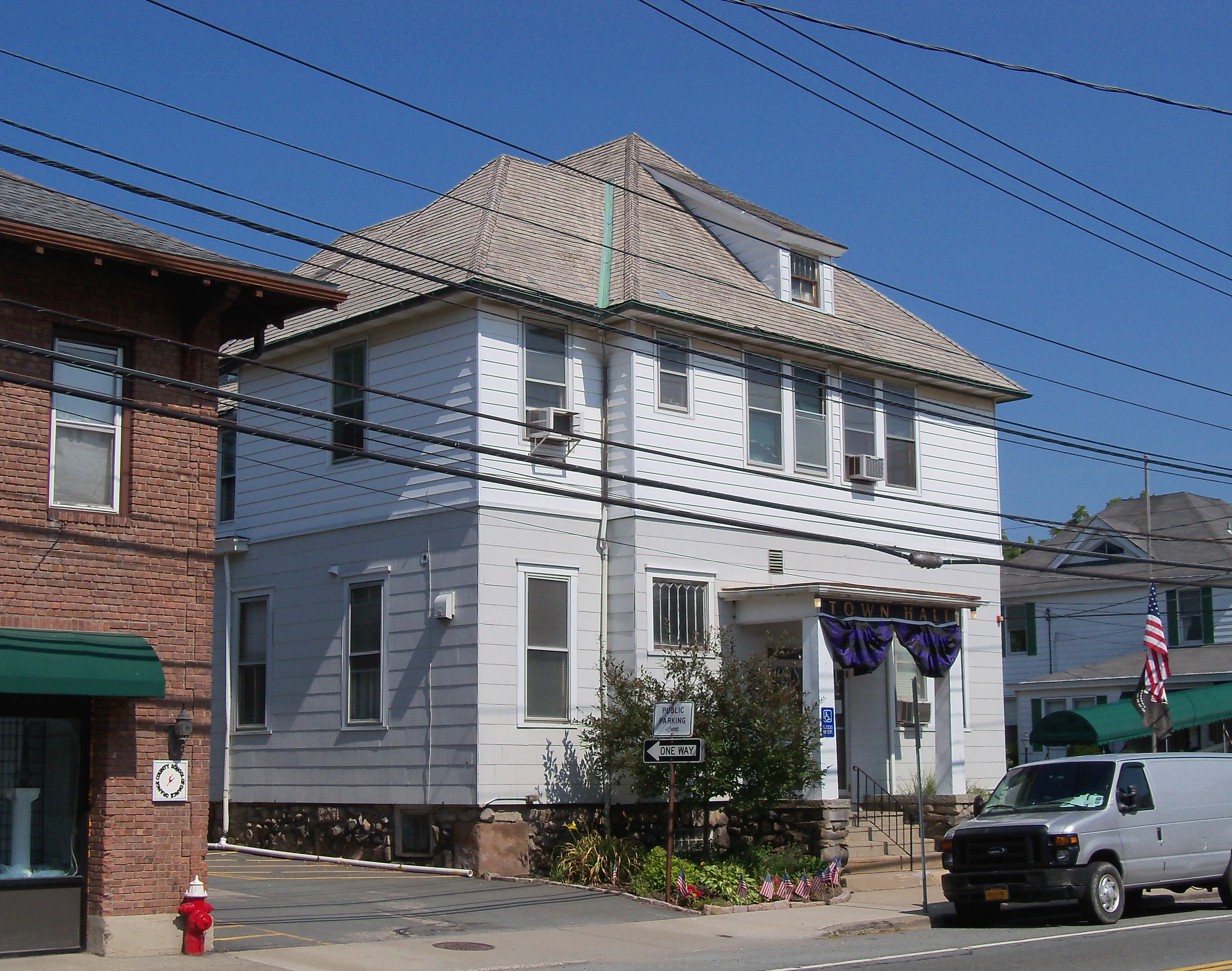
Woodbury Town Hall

The town is governed by a board of four elected councilmen, elected for staggered four-year terms. Woodbury is governed under New York Town Law, by which the board holds executive and legislative powers. The day-to-day operations of the town are administered by a supervisor, elected for a two-year term. The supervisor also serves as a full voting member of (and chairs) the Town Board. The town voters also elect a town clerk, two town justices, a tax collector and a highway superintendent. Town elections are held on the Tuesday after the first Monday in November in odd-numbered calendar years. Elected officials take office the following January 1.

Woodbury has been a town dominated by the Republican Party since its establishment. However, Democrats have now succeeded in securing a majority of the town's enrolled voters, and won majority control of the Town Board for the first time in over 20 years at the 2007 elections. From January 1, 2010, to December 31, 2011, no Republican served on the Town Board following the 2009 election – the first time in town history the board had no Republican member. However, in the 2011 town elections, the two Republican candidates for two council seats were elected. This put Republican representation back on the town board as of January 1, 2012. On January 1, 2015, Republicans took a majority on the town board when Ralph Caruso became Town Supervisor. Republicans lost the majority in the 2015 elections when Supervisor Ralph Caruso and Councilman Marilyn Prestia were defeated.

Supervisor - Jaqueline Hernandez (D)

Deputy supervisor - Martha Lopez (R)

Town clerk/registrar - Nicole Young (R)

Town justices - Bruce Schonberg (D) & David Hasin (R)

Town board - Martha Lopez (R), Vernick Alvarez (D), Brandon Calore (R),

Tax collector - Karen Poggio (R)

Highway superintendent - Position abolished December 31, 2015; as of January 1, 2016, maintenance of roads is undertaken by village personnel.

(R) – Republican Party (D) – Democratic Party (C) - Conservative Party (I) – Independence Party

=== Former town supervisors ===
The following have served as town supervisor of Woodbury, either by election or on an acting basis since the founding of the town. Between 1890 and 1969 the supervisor represented the town on the Orange County Board of Supervisors – the governing body of the county until December 31, 1969, when charter government took effect.

1890–1899 John Patterson (R)

1900–1905 James Seaman (R)

1906–1907 Alexander Thompson (R)

1908–1909 William Ferguson (R)

1910–1921 Richard Bullwinkle (R)

1922–1930 William McClellan (R) (died in office November 2, 1930)

1930–1933 Norman C. Lawson (R) (appointed by town board to fill vacancy, then elected)

1934–1935 Walter Doscher (D)

1936–1947 Howard B. Gregory (R)

1948–1957 Walter H. Belding (R)

1958–1967 Stephen W. Hayes, Sr. (D)

1968–1981 Louis R. "Bud" Burgunder (R)

1982–1985 Lawrence Bayard (D) (resigned)

1985 Marie Brickley, Dep. Supervisor (D) (acting)

1985 Louis R. "Bud" Burgunder (R) (appointed by town board to permanently fill vacancy until 12/31/85)

1986–1995 Robert Till (R)

1996–1999 Joan Caruso (R)

2000 Jay Gubernick (R) (died in Office-November 2, 2000)

2000–2001 Henry J. Dobson, Dep. Supervisor (R) (acting)

2001 Theodore Jones, (R) (appointed by town board to permanently fill vacancy until 12/31/01)

2002–2005 Sheila Conroy (R)

2006–2014 John Burke (D) (died in office-July 29, 2014)

2014 Desiree Potvin, Dep. Supervisor (R) (acting) (Resigned as Deputy Supervisor, 8/4/14)

2014 Frank J. Palermo, Dep. Supervisor (I) (acting) (Appointed by town board as Deputy Supervisor, 8/4/14)

2015 Ralph Caruso (R) (elected 11/4/2014, to fill last year of the late Supervisor Burke's term: 1/1/2015-12/31/2015)

2016–2017 David Sutz (D)

2018–2021 Frank J. Palermo (D)

2021-2023 Thomas Burke (D)

2024 - 2025 Kathryn Luciani

=== Village ===
The village is governed by a board of trustees, consisting of four trustees elected for staggered two-year terms. The board is the legislative branch of village government. The executive branch is headed by a mayor, elected for a two-year term and who is also a full voting member (and chair) of the board of trustees. Village elections were originally held each March. Effective with the village elections held in 2012, the election is now held in June. This change in date was approved by village voters in March 2011.

Village officials were originally elected on independent-party ballot lines. The two primary village parties were the Woodbury CommUNITY Party and the Woodbury Preservation Party. In the 2009 village elections, a third party named the Common Sense Party emerged, whose members were voted into office at the March 18, 2009, elections. They took office at the organizational meeting, held at the beginning of April.

Residents voted in 2013 to change the election date to November to coincide with the general elections, and to have Orange County election officials run the village elections. Following the November 2021 elections, the current village officials are:

Mayor - Andrew Giacomazza (R)

Village board - Tara Burek (R), Christopher Graziano (R), Kathleen Mottola (R), Stefanie Powell (D)

Village attorney - Bleakley Platt & Schmidt, LLP

Village Treasurer - Desiree Potvin

Village Clerk - Jessica McClennan

=== Former mayors ===
Stephanie Berean-Weeks – 2007—2009

Michael Queenan - 2009–2019

Timothy Egan - 2020 - 2021

== Government ==
A portion of the West Point Military Reservation is in Woodbury.

== Education ==
Most of Woodbury is in the Monroe-Woodbury Central School District. Portions are in the Highland Falls-Fort Montgomery Central School District, Haverstraw-Stony Point Central School District, and the Cornwall Central School District. James I. O'Neill High School is the high school of the Highland Falls-Fort Montgomery portion.
