= Monroe, New York (disambiguation) =

Monroe, New York, may refer to two municipalities in Orange County, New York, in the United States:

- Monroe (town), New York, a town in Orange County, New York
- Monroe (village), New York, located entirely within the town
- Monroe County, New York, a county in the western portion of New York state
- West Monroe, New York, a town in Oswego County, New York
