= Checkerboard Inn =

- U.S. National Register of Historic Places
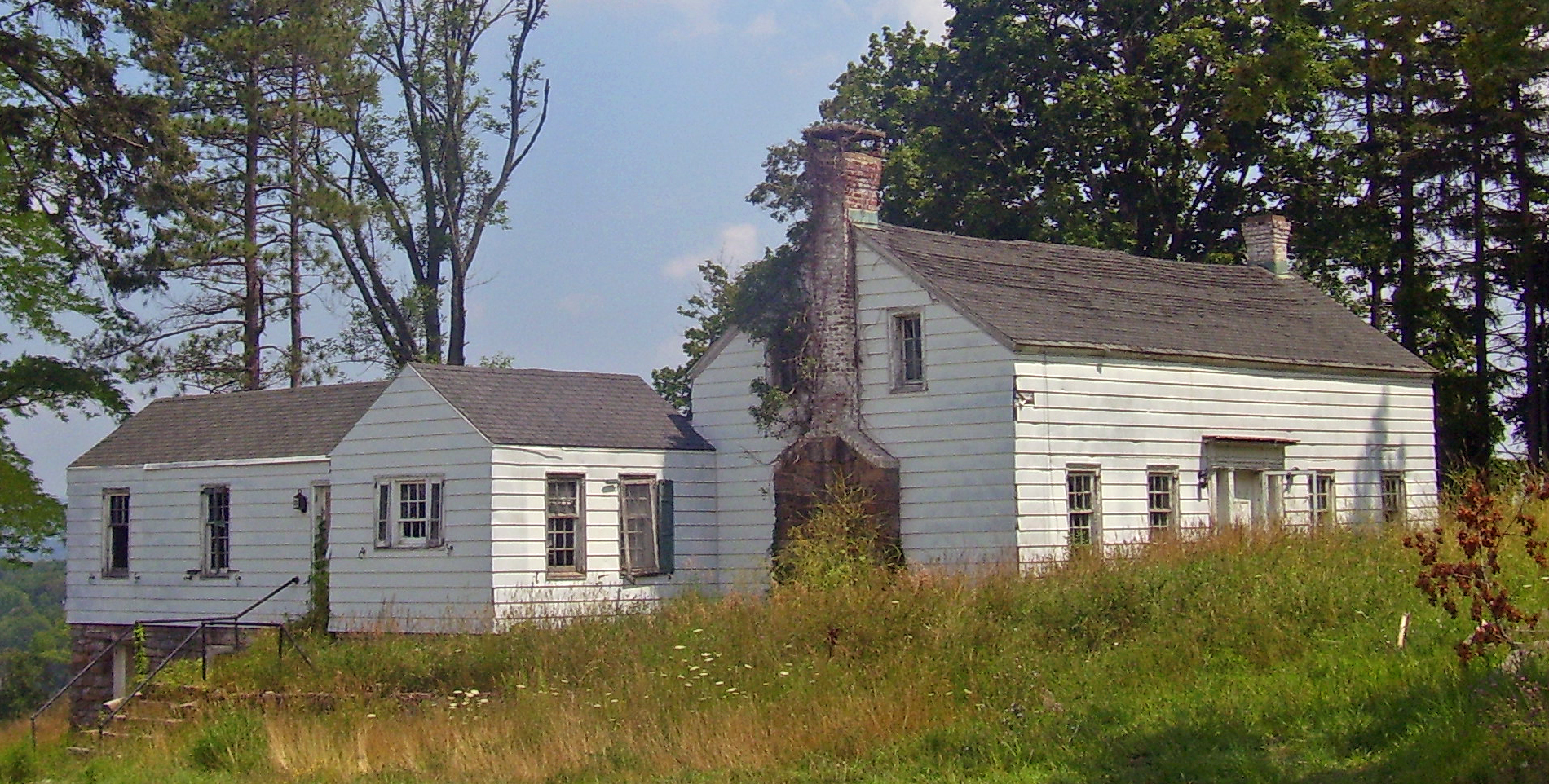
- Front (south) elevation and west profile, 2008
- Location: Monroe, NY
- Nearest city: Newburgh
- Coordinates: 41°18′02″N 74°11′01″W
- Area: 0.39 acres (1,600 m^{2})
- Built: ca. 1790
- Architectural style: Federal style
- NRHP reference No.: 06001078
- Added to NRHP: November 29, 2006

The Checkerboard Inn, also known as the Forshee-Jenkins House, is a late 18th-century frame building located on Mansion Ridge Golf Club in Monroe, New York, United States. Originally built as a house, within a decade it went into service as an inn when the Orange Turnpike, an early toll road through the area, opened in 1802. It takes its name from an early owner's reputed decision to paint it in a checkerboard pattern to attract business, although this has not been conclusively established.

In the 20th century, it was expanded to serve as a family cottage for the family of a New York silk merchant, Moses Migel. Today, after many other owners and a long period of neglect, it remains standing, vacant, next to the golf course's clubhouse. It is the property of the Town of Monroe, and was listed on the National Register of Historic Places in 2006. The town is hoping to raise the money to restore it and use it as a local history museum.

== Building ==
The house is built into a gentle slope on a hill looking out over its section of the New York-New Jersey Highlands, and ultimately the Shawangunk Ridge in the distance. At the north end the foundations are visible. A small group of trees surrounds it on three sides. An old road grade is visible to the east.

The older main section is one and a half stories high and five bays wide, sided in aluminum over old pine clapboards. In the center of the facade is the main entrance, a Federal style entrance with fluted pilasters supporting an entablature and cornice. The asbestos-shingled gabled roof is pierced by brick chimneys at either end. A badly deteriorated porch is attached to the rear.

From the west end projects a double wing, one one-by-two-bay section continuing to the west, set slightly back, with a larger three-by-one section extending to the north. The east wing is similar to the west wing, just a little larger. A terrace is between the two wings in the rear.

On the inside, the house follows a center-hall plan, with fireplaces heating either end. The walls are finished in plaster on lath, likely replaced since original construction. Most trim is original with the exception of a bathroom and nearby cabinet added in the 20th century. The basement is unfinished.

== History ==
Between 1790 and 1810 the main block was built in a vernacular local style for a local farmer named Bernard Forshee. In 1802 the Orange Turnpike, which elsewhere in the county is today followed by state highways 17 and 17M, was routed past the house. A segment of its bed remains just to the east of the house. A milestone that was also next to it has since been stolen.

At some point during the turnpike's years of operation, according to local lore, the house was converted to an inn for travelers. Since it was just south of what is today the village of Monroe, where there were many other inns, Forshee supposedly decided to distinguish the Forshee House by painting it in a black-and-white checkerboard pattern.

He sold it to his son John in 1823, who in turn sold it to an Ira Jenkins ten years later. By that point many of the early turnpikes were going broke and reverting to public ownership and maintenance. It is believed that the house's use as an inn was discontinued, although the checkerboard pattern apparently remained long enough that traces of it continued to exist into the 20th century.

In 1916 New York City silk merchant Moses Charles Migel bought the property and surrounding lands to make Greenbraes Farm, his 230-acre (93 ha) estate. Since he wanted to build a stone barn and house nearby (today Mansion Ridge's clubhouse), it was necessary to relocate the road off the property, a move that also helped smooth out a steep descent into Monroe. The Migels paid for the road to be relocated and rebuilt along its current alignment; Mary Harriman granted a right-of-way.

Three decades later, Migel's son Richard had grown and married. The two wings were added to the house to accommodate them in the late 1940s, and a shed-roof on the rear elevation, the only significant changes made during its existence. Original wrought iron hardware, which the Migels intended to retain, was accidentally melted down as scrap during this process.

The house remained a private residence until the mid-1990s, when the last owners moved out. It then became the property of a developer, Great Expectations, which had acquired the entire former Migel Estate to develop into the current Mansion Ridge golf-and-condominium complex. As part of the approval process, Great Expectations donated the Checkerboard Inn to the Town of Monroe. Three years later the town began the process of seeking a state grant to remodel it into a local history museum.
