= Village of Monroe Historic District =

Historic district in New York, United States

- U.S. National Register of Historic Places
- U.S. Historic district
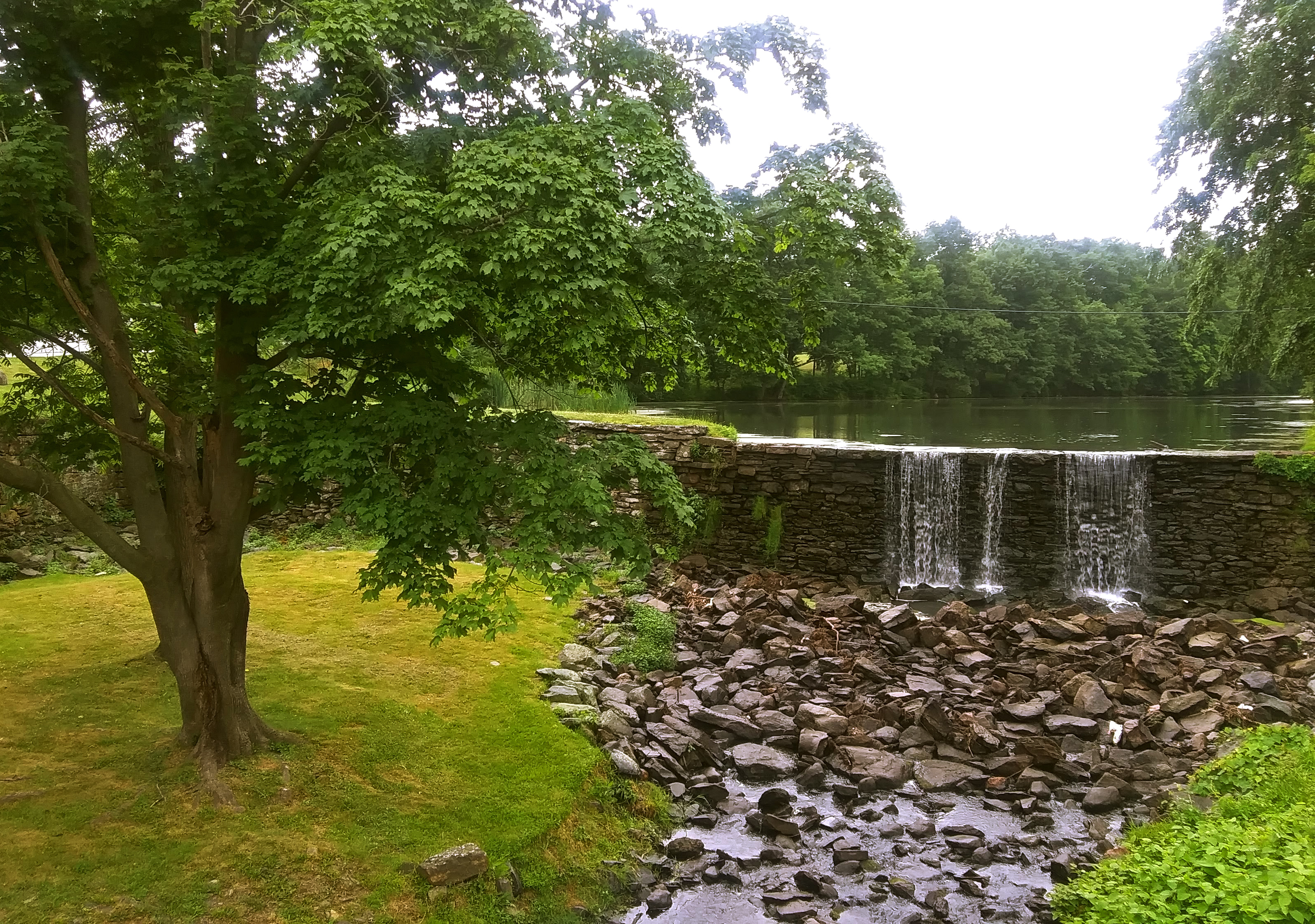
- Rebuilt Smith's Mill dam, 2022

- Location within New York Location within the United States
- Location: Monroe, NY
- Nearest city: Newburgh
- Coordinates: 41°19′27″N 74°11′13″W
- Area: 81 acres (33 ha)
- Built: 1760–1940
- Architectural style: Gothic Revival, Federal, Greek Revival
- NRHP reference No.: 98001391
- Added to NRHP: 1998

The Village of Monroe Historic District, also known as the Smith's Mill Historic District, is located in Monroe, New York, United States. It is an irregularly shaped 81-acre (33 ha) area containing 36 properties, primarily residential but with some churches and commercial buildings, in the center of the village, just east of its downtown. In 1998 it was listed on the National Register of Historic Places.

Most of the district is open space, taken up by a mill pond and park, a cemetery and the former site of a racetrack. Its buildings, mostly from the 19th century but some predating the Revolution, are clustered in a small area Stage Road and represent the early core of Monroe from the days when Smith's Mill, its first business, had dammed the waters of Ramapo Creek. They are also survivors of an 1892 fire that devastated the village. The Greek Revival and Federal architectural styles prevail, with some mid-19th-century Gothic Revival homes included. Among the contributing properties are the oldest Masonic Lodge in New York, and the home of David Smith, the village's first settler.

== Geography ==
The most consistent boundary of the district is New York State Route 17M on its west, from Lake Street, including the entire mill pond and park, to a point a half-mile (1 km) west of its intersection with the Stage Road, now Orange County Route 19. A small area west of 17M, primarily along Stage but also including portions along Oakland, Mill and Ramapo streets, is included. The only other deviation from 17M is the exclusion of two large lots not part of Monroe Cemetery or the racetrack to the northeast of the 17M-Stage Road intersection.

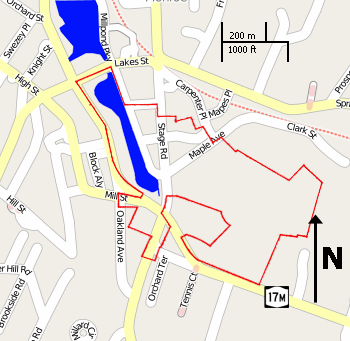
Map of district

Along the east, the boundary follows the west side of Mill Pond Parkway south from Lake, then runs east along the south side of Smithfield Court to follow the west side of Stage south for a short distance. Then it makes a zigzag path along lot boundaries to the junction of Carpenter Place and Maple Street. At that point it extends south to take in Monroe Cemetery, then returns to Stage and 17M.

== History ==
=== 18th and 19th centuries ===
The village of Monroe began with the arrival of David Smith, originally from Brookhaven on Long Island, who in 1747 bought a 276-acre (112 ha) tract of the Cheesecocks Patent, where he had built a house six years earlier, in 1741, at what is now the junction of Maple and Stage. In 1761 he bought an adjacent tract, and these two purchases make up much of today's Monroe.

He had dammed the creek to start a mill, and very soon the settlement came to be known as Smith's Mills. As it continued to grow into the early 19th century, it was renamed to first Southfield and then, in 1808, Munroe, after a then-state senator. Later confusion over the spelling during the administration of President James Monroe led to the more common spelling being adopted, as well as stories that the village was named after the president.

This period of Monroe's growth is reflected in the Federal style houses within it, as well as McGarrah's Tavern at Stage and 17M. It was chartered as a Masonic lodge in 1814 and remains the oldest such building in New York.

By 1836 its economy included not only milling but an iron industry which not only smelted the ore in the nearby hills but made it into finished products like nails and anchors. The New York and Erie Railroad routed its main line through what was then the village's outskirts in 1841, opening up new markets to Monroe. During this period the Federal style began to yield in popularity to the Greek Revival mode. The 1811 Nicholas Knight House on Stage Road was later renovated into a strong example of this style, and the 1853 First Presbyterian Church of Monroe, also on Stage, shows a more advanced interpretation of the style.

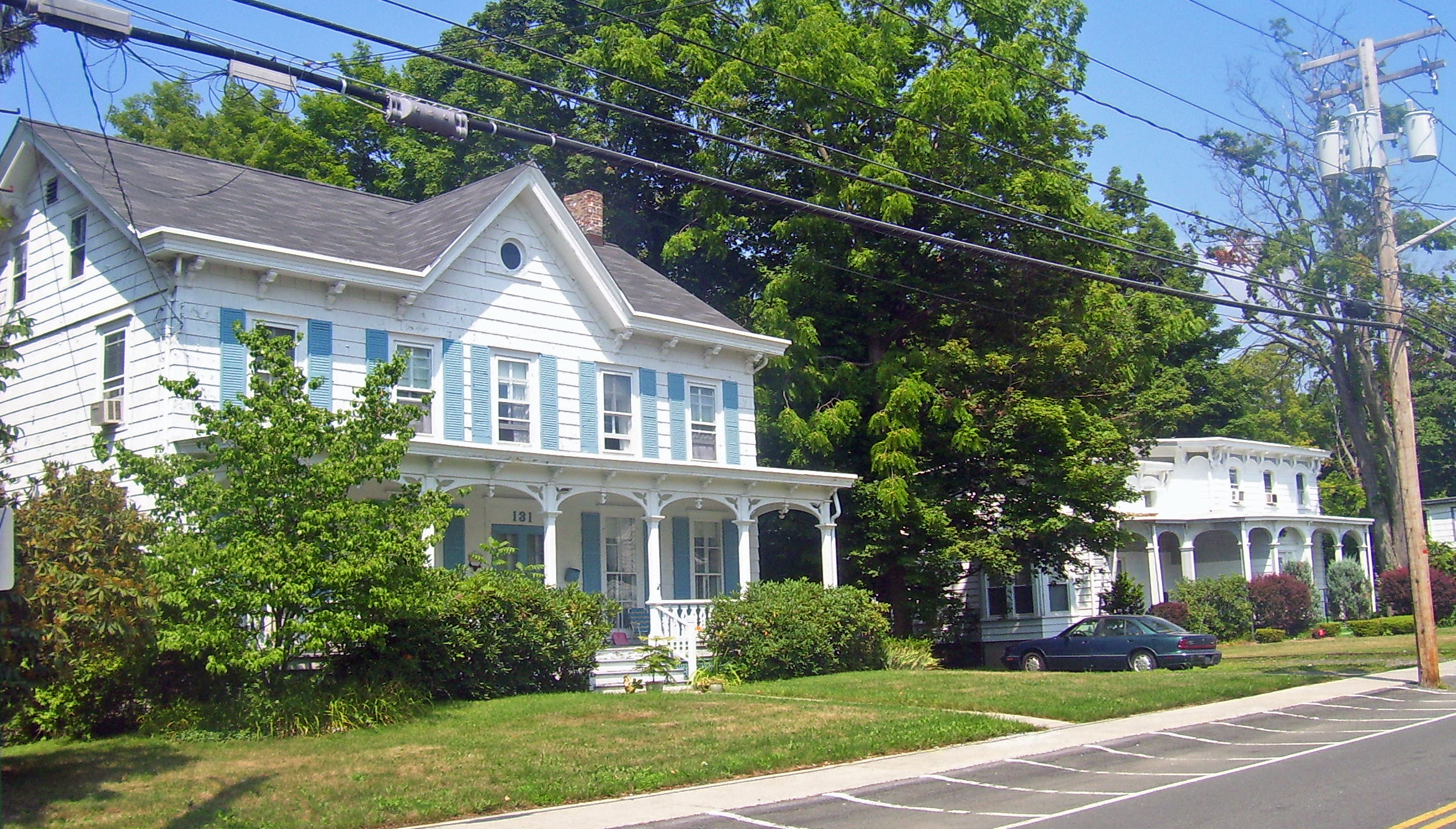
Mid-19th-century homes along Stage Road

The railroads would be responsible for the Monroe Cheese Company making Velveeta a nationally known brand from its 1873 introduction. Its Italianate brick former factory remains on Mill Pond Road. Of the different styles popular in the late Victorian period, the Queen Anne Style was most in evidence in Monroe. The 1841 Methodist Church on Maple Avenue was renovated in Queen Anne style in 1885, and over a decade later, in 1896, the Church of the Sacred Heart was built in that style.

In 1892 a fire destroyed much of the village's then-downtown, to the east of the mill and older houses. The citizens responded by formally incorporating the village two years later, in order to establish a fire department and water supply system.

=== 20th and 21st centuries ===
New construction in the historic core of the village began to drop off in the early 20th century, as the village expanded and other areas were developed. The racetrack became a popular venue for the local harness racing circuit between 1908 and 1927. The Colonial Revival style was not as popular as its Victorian predecessors had been, so there are few examples of it in the district. The most notable is the American Foursquare house at 132 Stage Road, dating to 1910.

Since 1940 there has been no major new construction in the district, save the 1948 Classical Revival Monroe Theatre, next to the cheese factory. The racetrack's grandstand was demolished in 1964. The stone bridge was demolished in 1994. The Monroe Theater was demolished and replaced with a modern structure, which has since been acquired by the Town of Monroe.

== Significant contributing properties ==
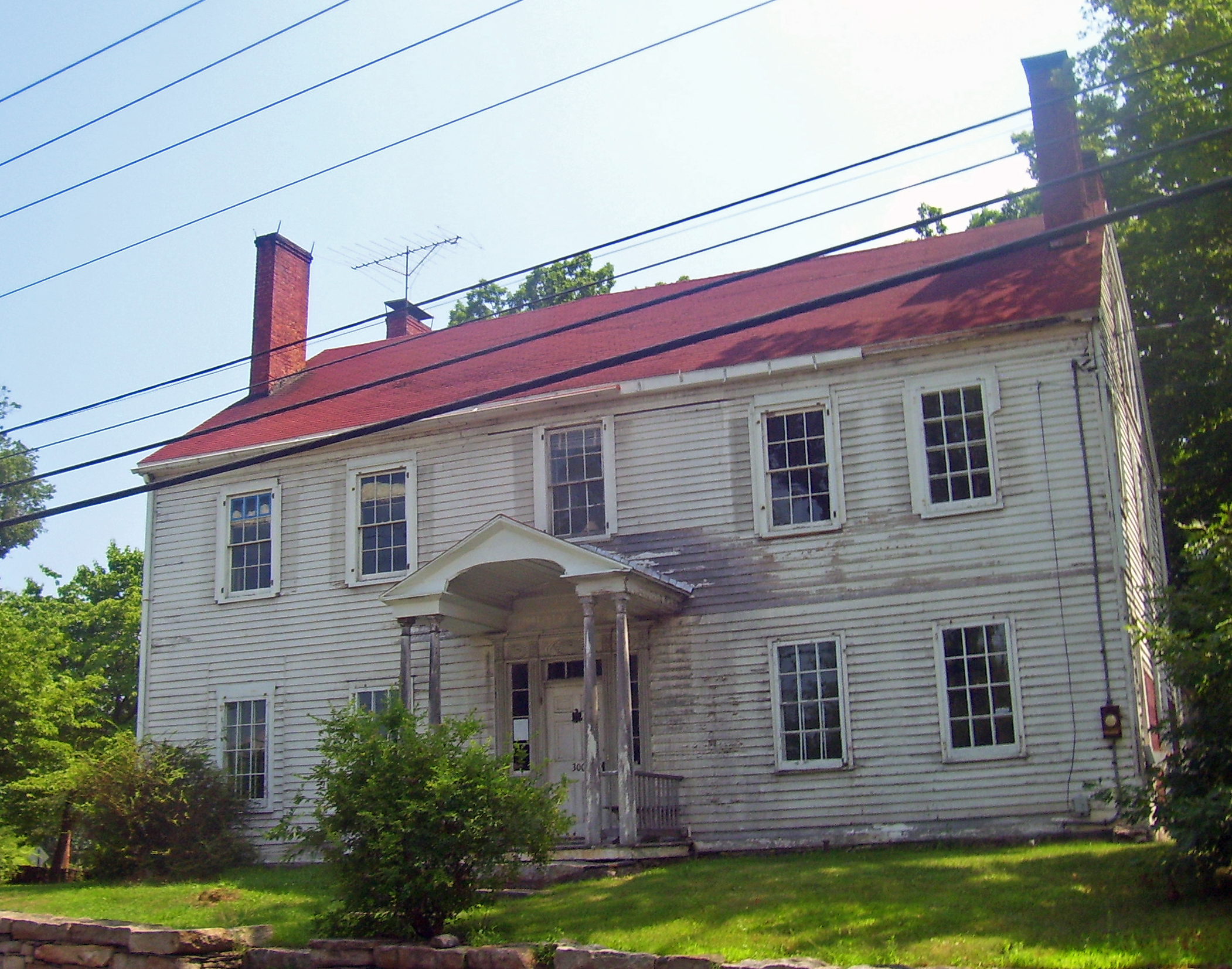
McGarrah's Tavern

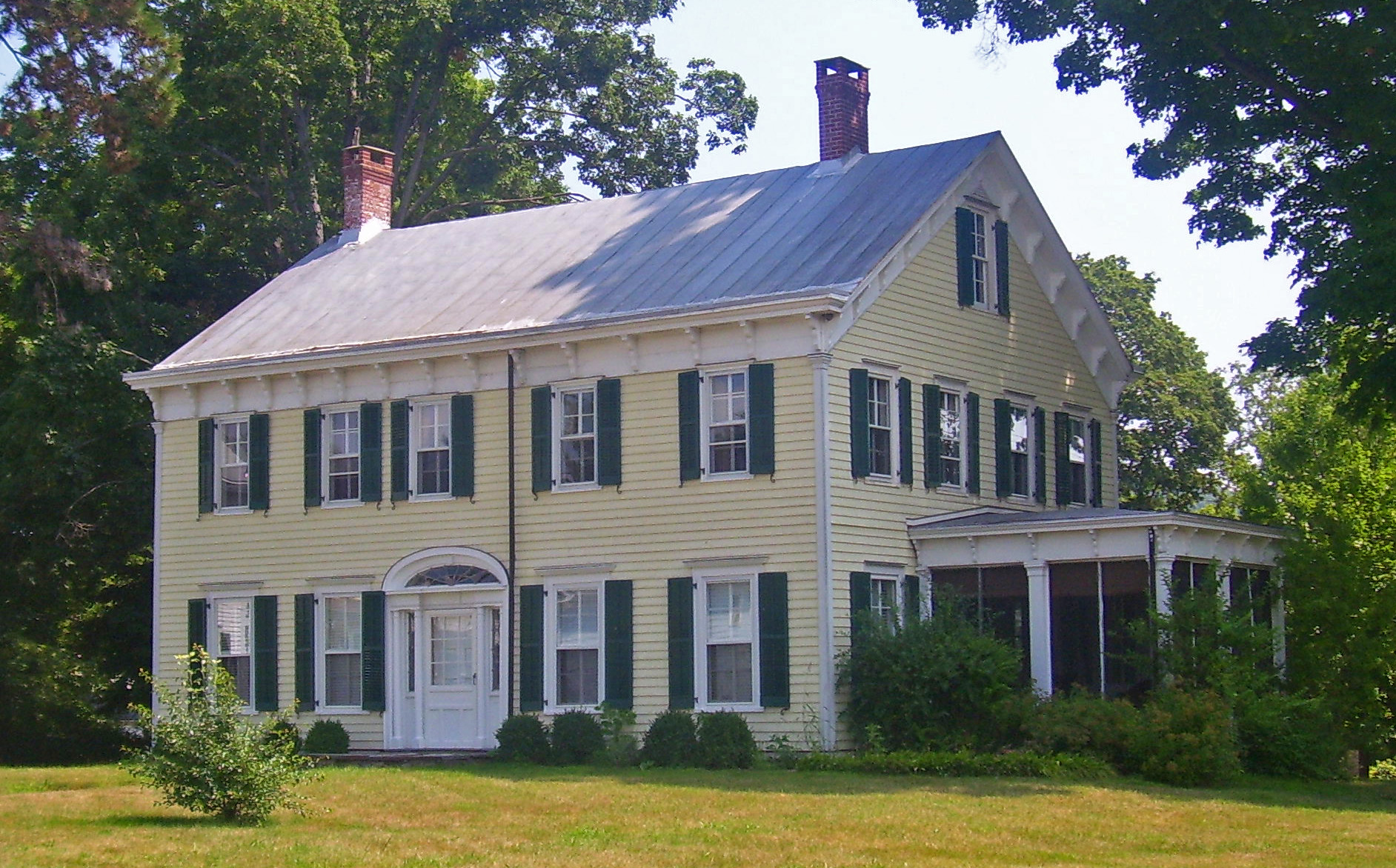
Judge Seaman House

The 36 contributing properties contain 70 total buildings and structures. Of these 47 buildings and 9 structures, along with four sites, are considered historic resources of the district. None have yet been listed separately on the Register. Eight other buildings (mostly garages), and one structure, are of late 20th-century construction and are not considered contributing.

- Hophni Smith House, 400 Stage Road. A 1 1/2-story saltbox house built c. 1750. Moved to its present site in the mid-19th century.
- David Smith-Jeremiah Knight House, 315 Stage Road. A 2 1/2-story Federal frame house with rear extension added later. A portion is believed to have been the house Smith built in 1741.
- Smith-Knight Grist Mill, next to house. Remains of foundation and other structures like dam, race and flume survive from 1750 construction. Large mill pond is now the center of a village park.
- McGarrah's Inn, also known as Goff's Tavern, 300 Stage Road. First built c. 1800, the 3rd floor was used by Cornerstone Lodge #231 F&AM from 1814-1826. Expanded to present form in 1839. Served as residence of village mayor and Nuremberg Trials prosecutor Frederick Hulse. Owned by the Cornerstone Masonic Historical Society and home to Cornerstone Lodge #711 F&AM the building is currently undergoing restoration efforts and the third floor lodge room continues to be in use.
- Monroe Cemetery, north side of NY 17M. Graveyard of early settlers, later expanded in the 19th century. Funerary art from both periods.
- Monroe Cheese Company, 30 Mill Pond Road. Three-story brick Italianate factory dating to c. 1880.
- Monroe Presbyterian Church, 142 Stage Road. Greek Revival church built in 1853 fronted with fluted columns topped with molded frieze. One of Monroe's most visible landmarks.
- Monroe Race Track. In undeveloped land south of Stage. Site of harness racing in the early 20th century. Gravel track remains.
- Monroe Theatre, 34 Mill Pond Parkway. 1940s masonry Classical Revival theatre with four stone pilasters supporting a frieze and pediment.
- Judge William Seaman House, 160 Stage Road. First built as tavern in 1809, moved back from the road and renovated in 1850. Greek Revival and Italianate detailing added at that time. Original porch removed in the 1930s.

== See also ==
- National Register of Historic Places listings in Orange County, New York
