= Yelverton Inn and Store =

- U.S. National Register of Historic Places
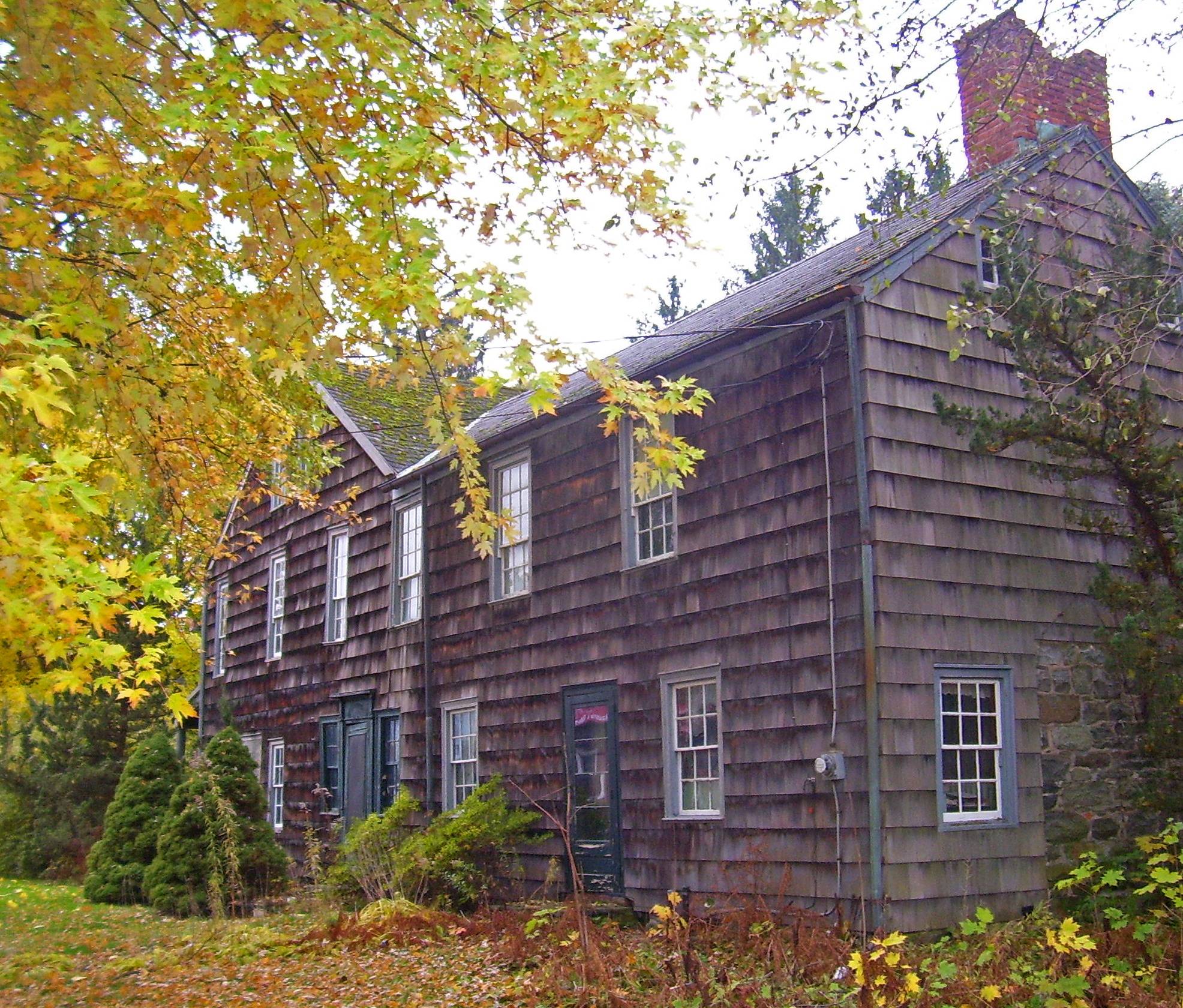
- Inn building in 2007
- Location: Chester, NY
- Nearest city: Middletown
- Coordinates: 41°21′22″N 74°16′40″W
- Area: 1.8 acres (7,056 m^{2})
- Built: 1765, 1841
- Architectural style: Colonial, Greek Revival
- NRHP reference No.: 80002733
- Added to NRHP: 1980

The Yelverton Inn and Store is a group of four historical buildings in Chester, New York, United States. Located on NY 94 where the highway turns from Main to Academy Street,. The complex includes the original 1765 inn, its barn and shed, and the 1841 store, known locally as Durland's. The latter building is a rare surviving example of a Greek Revival commercial building. Both the Inn and store have been local landmarks in Chester for many years, and were added to the National Register of Historic Places in 1980.

The buildings, which hosted Alexander Hamilton, Aaron Burr and George Washington at different times, are well-preserved examples of their periods and architectural styles.

== Buildings ==
The inn, the earliest of the three to be built, is a two-story L-shaped frame residence facing Main Street adjacent to the First Presbyterian Church of Chester . A smaller northern wing was later almost enveloped by a five-bay gabled section to form the present building. Later, an enclosed porch was built. Two Federal style doorways were also added in the early 19th century when that style was popular.

Inside, the original flooring, doors and most trim remain. The interior doors have an unusual "tau-cross" frame in which applied molding surrounds flat inset panels. A fireplace in the master bedroom was probably added around 1795.

It has a frame shed and barn behind it. The shed has an unusual decoration of 17 round holes drilled below the cornice on the gable end. The three-story barn has a lower section of brick and stone yielding to shingle up top.

The store was first raised on Christmas Day in 1841 and finished the next spring. An overhang and the front pillars were added later that year. Its west wing was originally a separate structure; after being connected it was used as a storeroom.

== History ==
Local deeds show that John Yelverton bought the land where the buildings now stand around 1755. The 1765 date long accepted as the year of the inn's construction seems likely from his will dated two years later, which names his son Abijan as the "innkeeper".

The first of several historic events in the inn's history took place on September 3, 1774, when local voters gathered there chose Henry Wisner of nearby Goshen as their delegate to the First Continental Congress. He was among those who voted, two years later, to declare independence but was not able to actually sign the Declaration of Independence as he had to attend to his duties as a member of the provincial congress. During the ensuing war, local militia were encamped and mustered on a nearby hillside.

In the last years of the war, on July 27, 1782, George Washington slept at the inn on his way back from Philadelphia to his headquarters in Newburgh to meet with Count Rochambeau. The event was commemorated 125 years later with a plaque attached to the building by the local chapter of the Daughters of the American Revolution.

After the war ended, a major local land dispute was settled on the grounds of the inn. Early in the century, two land grants had been made taking up most of what is now Orange County. They were known as the Wawayanda Patent, mostly to the southern portion of the county, and the Cheesecocks Patent to some of the northern areas. The former had not specified precisely where its northern boundary lay, and over the course of the century different owners claimed title to the same tracts of land. Several times during the colonial era this dispute had flared into litigation and sometimes violence, without being conclusively settled.

The Cheesecocks patentees claimed the boundary ran along a straight line rather than mountains, hilltops and ridges. As many as 52,000 acres (20,800 ha) were at stake, and a Suffolk County court ordered the creation of a special commission to hear the case upstate. It held its trial in a nearby barn (not the existing one), with the attorneys for the parties likely staying at the inn. Among those representing the Wawayanda claimants, who ultimately prevailed, were Alexander Hamilton and Aaron Burr. Elias Boudinot and Ezra L'Hommedieu were also present.
