= Administrative divisions of New York (state) =

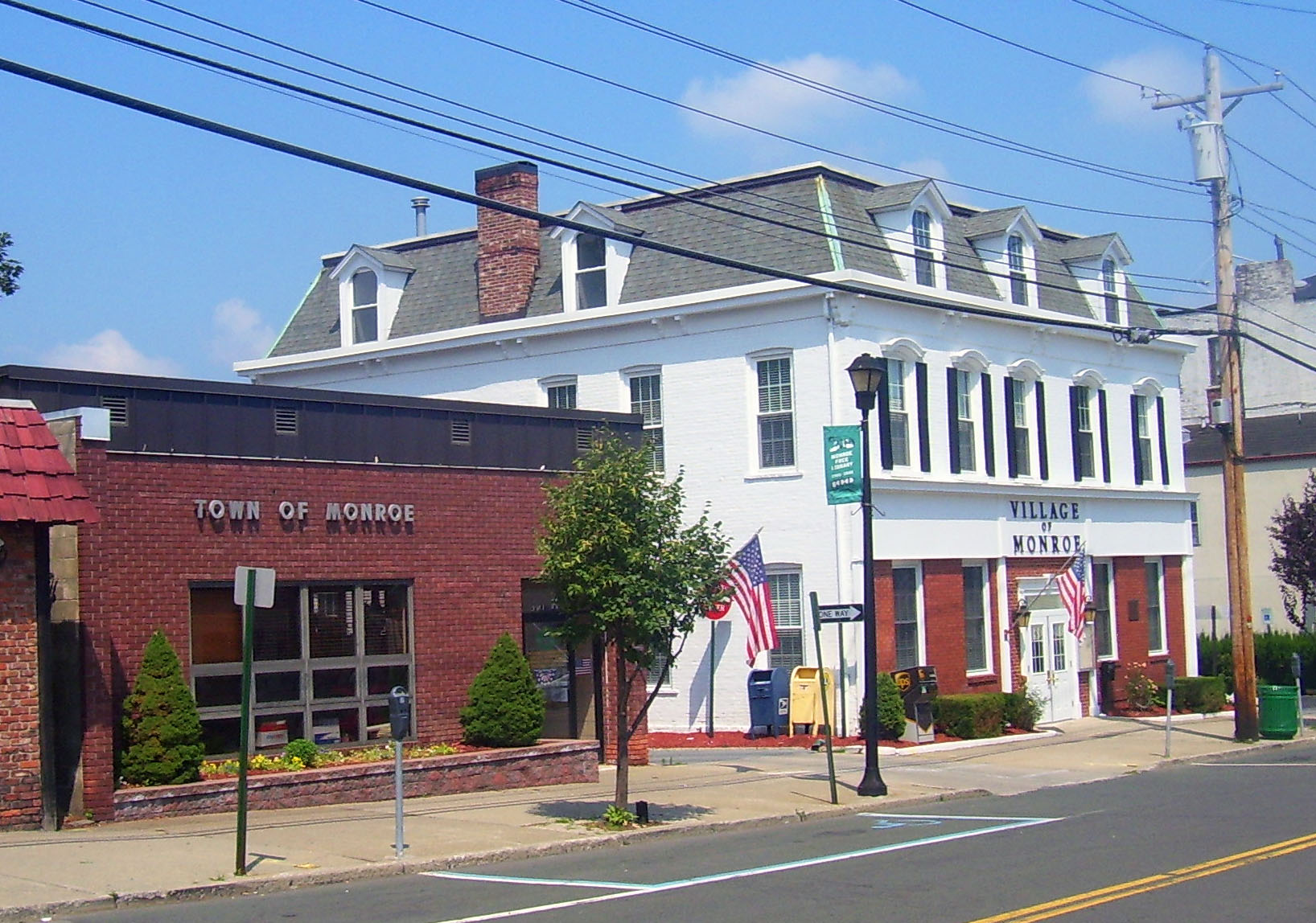
Separate municipal buildings for (at that time) the town and village of Monroe in Orange County

The administrative divisions of New York are the various units of government that provide local services in the U.S. state of New York. The state is divided into boroughs, counties, cities, towns, and villages. (The only boroughs, the five boroughs of New York City, have the same boundaries as their respective counties.) They are municipal corporations, chartered (created) by the New York State Legislature, under the New York State Constitution the only body that can create governmental units is the state. All of them have their own governments, sometimes with no paid employees, that provide local services. Centers of population that are not incorporated and have no government or local services are designated hamlets. Whether a municipality is defined as a borough, city, town, or village is determined not by population or land area, but rather on the form of government selected by the residents and approved by the New York State Legislature. Each type of local government is granted specific home rule powers by the New York State Constitution. There are still occasional changes as a village becomes a city, or a village dissolves (stops existing), each of which requires legislative action. New York also has various corporate entities that provide local services and have their own administrative structures (governments), such as school and fire districts. These are not found in all counties.

Almost every piece of land in the state is part of a city or town, which is part of one county. The exceptions are the city of Geneva; New York City; and Indian reservations.

New York has 62 counties (including New York City's five boroughs), which are subdivided into 933 towns and 62 cities (including Geneva, New York City, and Sherrill). In total, the state has more than 3,400 active local governments and more than 4,200 taxing jurisdictions.

== Home rule ==
Counties and incorporated municipal governments (also known as "general purpose units of local government"; i.e., cities, towns and villages) in the State of New York have been granted broad home rule powers enabling them to provide services to their residents and to regulate the quality of life within their jurisdictions. They do so while adhering to the Constitution of the United States and the Constitution of the State of New York. Articles VIII (titled "Local Finances") and IX (titled "Local Government", but commonly referred to as the "Home Rule" article) of the state constitution establish the rights and responsibilities of the municipal governments.

The New York State Constitution provides for democratically elected legislative bodies for counties, cities, towns and villages. These legislative bodies are granted the power to enact local laws as needed in order to provide services to their citizens and fulfill their various obligations.

== County ==

The county is the primary administrative division of New York. There are sixty-two counties in the state. Five of the counties are governed as boroughs of the City of New York so do not have separate county governments. While originally created as subdivisions of the state meant to carry out state functions, counties are now considered municipal corporations with the power and fiscal capacity to provide an array of local government services. Such services generally include law enforcement and public safety, social and health services (such as Medicaid), and education (special needs and community colleges).

Every county outside of New York City has a county seat, which is the location of county government.

Twenty-three counties operate under county charters, while 35 operate under the general provisions of the County Law. Although all counties have a certain latitude to govern themselves, "charter counties" are afforded greater home rule powers. The charter counties are Albany, Broome, Chautauqua, Chemung, Dutchess, Erie, Herkimer, Monroe, Montgomery, Nassau, Oneida, Onondaga, Orange, Putnam, Rensselaer, Rockland, Schenectady, Steuben, Suffolk, Sullivan, Tompkins, Ulster, and Westchester.

Sixteen counties are governed through an assembly with the power of a board of supervisors, composed of the supervisors of its constituent towns and cities. In most of these counties, each supervisor's vote is weighted in accordance with the town's population in order to abide by the U.S. Supreme Court mandate of "one person, one vote". Other counties have legislative districts of equal population, which may cross municipal borders; these counties may also have an elected County Executive. Most counties in New York do not use the term "Board of Supervisors." 34 counties have a County Legislature, six counties have a Board of Legislators, and one county has a Board of Representatives. The five counties, or boroughs, of New York City are governed by a 51-member City Council.

In non-charter counties, the legislative body exercises executive power as well. Although the legislature can delegate certain functions and duties to a county administrator, who acts on behalf of the legislature, the legislature must maintain ultimate control over the actions of the administrator. Many, but not all, charter counties have an elected executive who is independent of the legislature; the exact form of government is defined in the County Charter.

== City ==
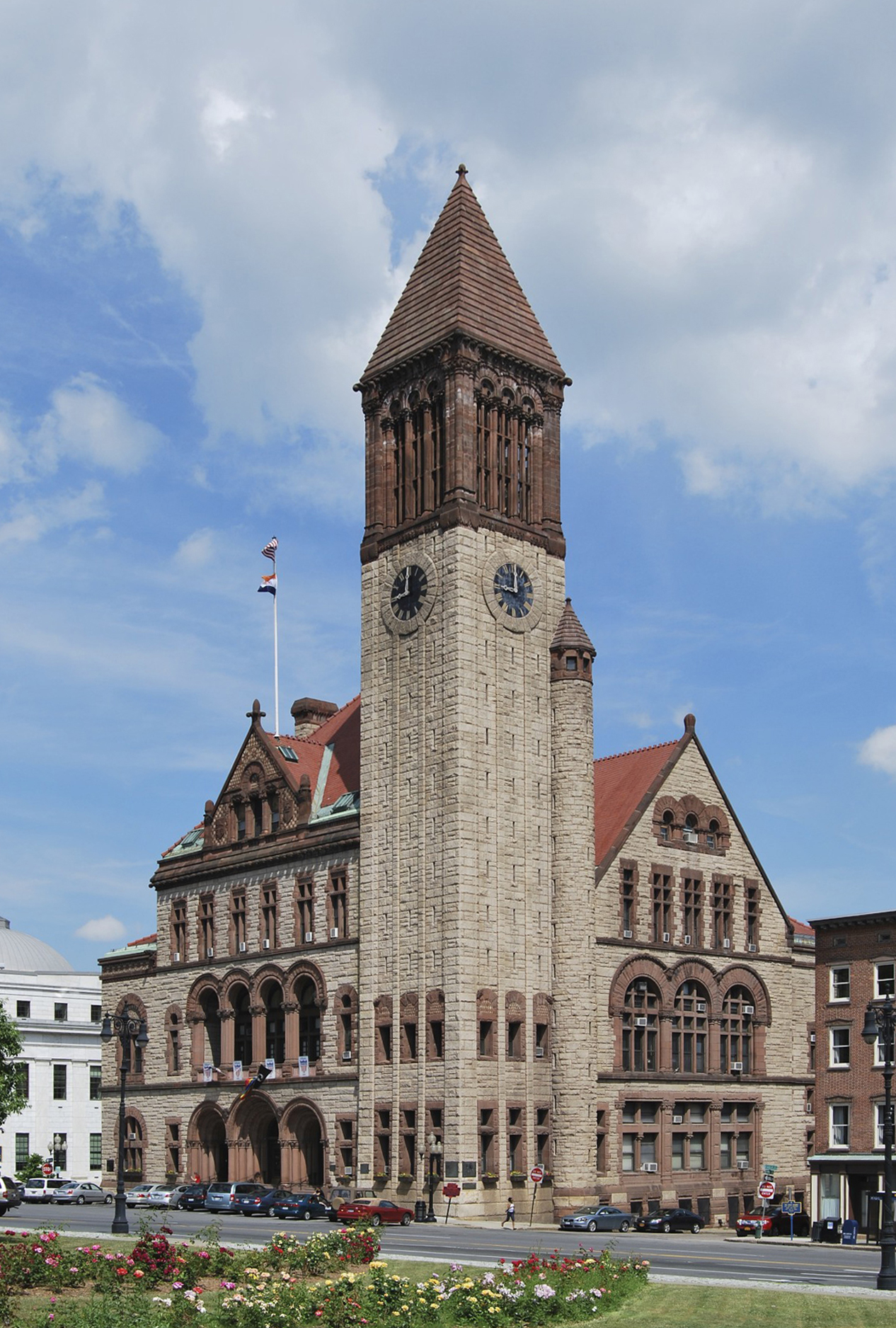
Albany City Hall, the seat of local government in New York's capital city

In New York, each city is a highly autonomous incorporated area that, with the exceptions of New York City and Geneva, is contained within one county. Cities in New York are classified by the U.S. Census Bureau as incorporated places. They provide almost all services to their residents and have the highest degree of home rule and taxing jurisdiction over their residents. The main difference between a city and a village is that cities are organized and governed according to their charters, which can differ widely among cities, while most villages are subject to a uniform statewide Village Law (twelve villages still operate under charters issued by the state legislature prior to a revision of the State Constitution in 1874 that forbade chartering villages). Also, villages are part of a town (or towns; some villages cross town borders), with residents who pay taxes to and receive services from the town. Cities are neither part of nor subordinate to towns except for the city of Sherrill, which for some purposes is treated as if it were a village of the town of Vernon. Some cities are completely surrounded by a town, typically of the same name.

There are sixty-two cities in the state. As of 2010, 53.72% of state residents were living in a city; 42.19% were living in New York City; 11.53% were living in one of the other 61 cities. In 1686, the English colonial governor granted the cities of New York and Albany city charters, which were recognized by the first State Constitution in 1777. All other cities have been established by act of the state legislature and have been granted a charter. Cities have been granted the power to revise their charters or adopt new ones. There are no minimum population or area requirements in order to become a city. While there is no defined process for how and when a village becomes a city, the Legislature requires clear evidence, usually in the form of a locally drafted charter, that the community in question seeks to incorporate as a city.

The forms of government cities can have are council–manager, strong mayor–council, weak mayor–council or commission. Forty-six cities, the majority, use the mayor–council form.

- Strong mayor–council – An elective mayor serves as the chief executive and administrative head of the city. A city council serves as a legislature. The mayor has veto power over council decisions, prepares a budget, and appoints and removes agency heads. This form sometimes includes a professional administrator appointed by the mayor.
- Weak mayor–council – The mayor is a ceremonial figure. The city council serves as both a legislature and executive committee. There is generally no mayoral veto.
- Council–manager – The mayor, if such a position exists, is ceremonial only. A professional administrator, appointed by the city council, serves as the administrative head. While empowered to appoint and remove agency heads and responsible for preparing a budget, the administrator does not have veto power. The city council serves as the legislature.
- Commission – Elected commissioners administer individual city departments and together act as a legislature. This form sometimes includes an administrator. There is no mayor, although commissioners sometimes assume mayoral ceremonial duties.

The City of New York is a special case. The state legislature reorganized government in the area in the 1890s in an effort to consolidate. Other cities, villages, and towns were annexed to become the "City of Greater New York", (an unofficial term, the new city retained the name of New York), a process basically completed in 1898. At the time of consolidation, Queens County was split. Its western towns joined the city, leaving three towns that were never part of the consolidation plan as part of Queens County but not part of the new Borough of Queens. (A small portion of the Town of Hempstead was itself annexed, also.) The next year (1899), the three eastern towns of Queens County separated to become Nassau County. The city today consists of the entire area of five counties (named New York, Kings, Queens, Bronx, and Richmond). While these counties have no county government, boroughs—with boundaries coterminous with the county boundaries—each have a Borough Board made up of the Borough President, the borough's district council members, and the chairpersons of the borough's community boards. A mayor serves as the city's chief executive officer.

The most populous and largest city in the state is New York City, with a population of over 8.5 million inhabitants and comprising just over 300 sq mi (777.00 km^{2}) of land (468.87 sq mi (1,214.368 km^{2}) total area, which includes water). The least populous city is Sherrill, New York, with just 3,071 inhabitants in 2010. The smallest city by area is Mechanicville, New York, which covers 0.91 sq mi (2.4 km^{2}) (of which 0.08 sq mi (0.2 km^{2}) is water).

=== Wards and other submunicipal divisions ===
The wards of New York City as established in 1683

Several cities, such as Albany, are divided into wards for the purposes of municipal representation. Each ward elects one member to the city's legislative body, and the wards are redistricted roughly every ten years. These divisions can go by other names by city; in Buffalo they are known as districts. These divisions can either be numbered or named. New York City was divided into wards at various times in its history between 1683 and 1938, although they were gradually replaced by Assembly and Senate districts starting in the mid-19th century; the New York City Council is currently elected from special districts, which are allowed to cross borough lines.

New York City has a unique system of divisions, some of which possess governmental power, see Divisions unique to New York City.

== Town ==
New York counties, municipalities, and towns.

In New York, a town is a municipal corporation, and is the major division of each county (excluding the five boroughs that comprise New York City). Towns are very similar to townships in other states such as Pennsylvania, New Jersey, Ohio, and Indiana. Towns in New York are classified by the U.S. Census Bureau as minor civil divisions. Like New Jersey, Pennsylvania, and southern New England, all of New York is incorporated, meaning all residents who do not live in a city or on an Indian reservation live in a town.

Towns provide or arrange for the primary functions of local government. While some provide most municipal services for all town residents and selected services for residents of villages, some provide little more than road maintenance. There were 933 towns in New York. As of 2010, 46.2% of state residents were living in a town; 36.39% were living in a town but outside a village. Whereas cities and villages can cross county boundaries, each town in New York is completely contained within a single county.

New York towns are classified by statute as being a town of the first class or a town of the second class. Additionally, a town of the first class can further be classified as a suburban town upon meeting certain criteria. Originally, towns of different classes possessed different powers. Since 1964, all towns, regardless of classification, have had the same legal powers as were once available only to suburban towns. Even so, towns of different classifications continue to have organizational differences and certain conditions that must be met before a town's classification changes.

The town board serves as the legislative branch. The board is composed of one elected town supervisor (or chief executive officer in suburban towns) and a specific number of elected council persons; towns of the second class generally have two but may have four council persons, whereas towns of the first class generally have four but can have two or six. The supervisor presides over the board, voting on all matters but not possessing veto or tie-breaking power. Certain towns operate under a town manager form of government, creating an executive branch in the town government, as permitted by legislation enacted in 1976. As such, some supervisors have additional authority or executive powers, whereas some towns have town managers or chief executive officers who serve as the executive branch. All town justices were originally part of a town's board. Today, justices belong to a separate judicial branch known as Town Court or Justice Court, part of New York's Justice Court system.

A town may contain one or more villages. Many towns have no villages. Five towns are coterminous with their single village and share the same name: Green Island in Albany County; East Rochester in Monroe County; and Scarsdale, Harrison, and Mount Kisco in Westchester County. A sixth, the town of Palm Tree in Orange County, was incorporated in 2019 and is coterminous with the village of Kiryas Joel, having acquired land from the town of Monroe. When such an entity is formed, officials from either unit of government may serve in both village and town governments simultaneously. A referendum is held to decide whether residents prefer a village-style or town-style government, which will then function primarily as a village or town but will perform some of the functions of the other form. Villages remain part of the towns in which they are located; village residents pay both town and village taxes, and vote in both town and village elections.

Towns can contain several hamlets and communities. If the United States Postal Service (USPS) has a post office in a hamlet it often will use the name of that hamlet, as will the local fire department or elementary school. Businesses may also use the name of a hamlet as part of their name. The United States Census Bureau will, with consideration from the town, designate a census-designated place (CDP) that may use the name of one or more hamlets, though boundaries may differ from what is used by the ZIP code, local fire department, etc.

Towns in New York may be further subdivided into wards, although as of 2017, only fifteen of the state's 932 towns used this system. In towns operating under the ward system, citizens vote for councilmen who represent a specific area (ward) of the town, as opposed to the at-large councilmen elected in the majority of the state's towns.

Towns vary in size and population. The largest town by area is Brookhaven (Suffolk County), which covers 531.5 sq mi (1,377 km^{2}), but more than half of that is water. The town of Webb (Herkimer County) has the greatest land area, at 451 sq mi (1,170 km^{2}). The smallest town, Green Island (Albany County), covers 0.7 sq mi (1.8 km^{2}). The town of Hempstead (Nassau County) has about 760,000 people (2010 census), making it more populous than any city in the state except New York City. Red House (Cattaraugus County), the least populous, has 38 permanent residents (2010 census).

The use of "town" in a community's name is irrespective of municipal status. Elizabethtown, Germantown and Stephentown are towns. Cooperstown, home of the Baseball Hall of Fame, is a village; Jamestown and Middletown are cities; and Levittown is an unincorporated hamlet.

=== Census-designated place ===
A census-designated place (CDP) is defined by the United States Census Bureau as "a statistical entity defined for each decennial census according to Census Bureau guidelines, comprising a densely settled concentration of population" that is not part of a city or a village "but is locally identified by a name." CDPs may cross town and county borders. CDPs are defined collaboratively by state and local officials and the Census Bureau. They are defined for each census, and it is commonplace to change boundaries and define new CDPs for each census.

The Census Bureau formerly referred to CDPs as "unincorporated places" from 1950 through the 1970 decennial censuses. The term CDP was first used for the 1980 census, and minimum population criteria for CDPs were dropped with the 2000 census.

=== Hamlet ===
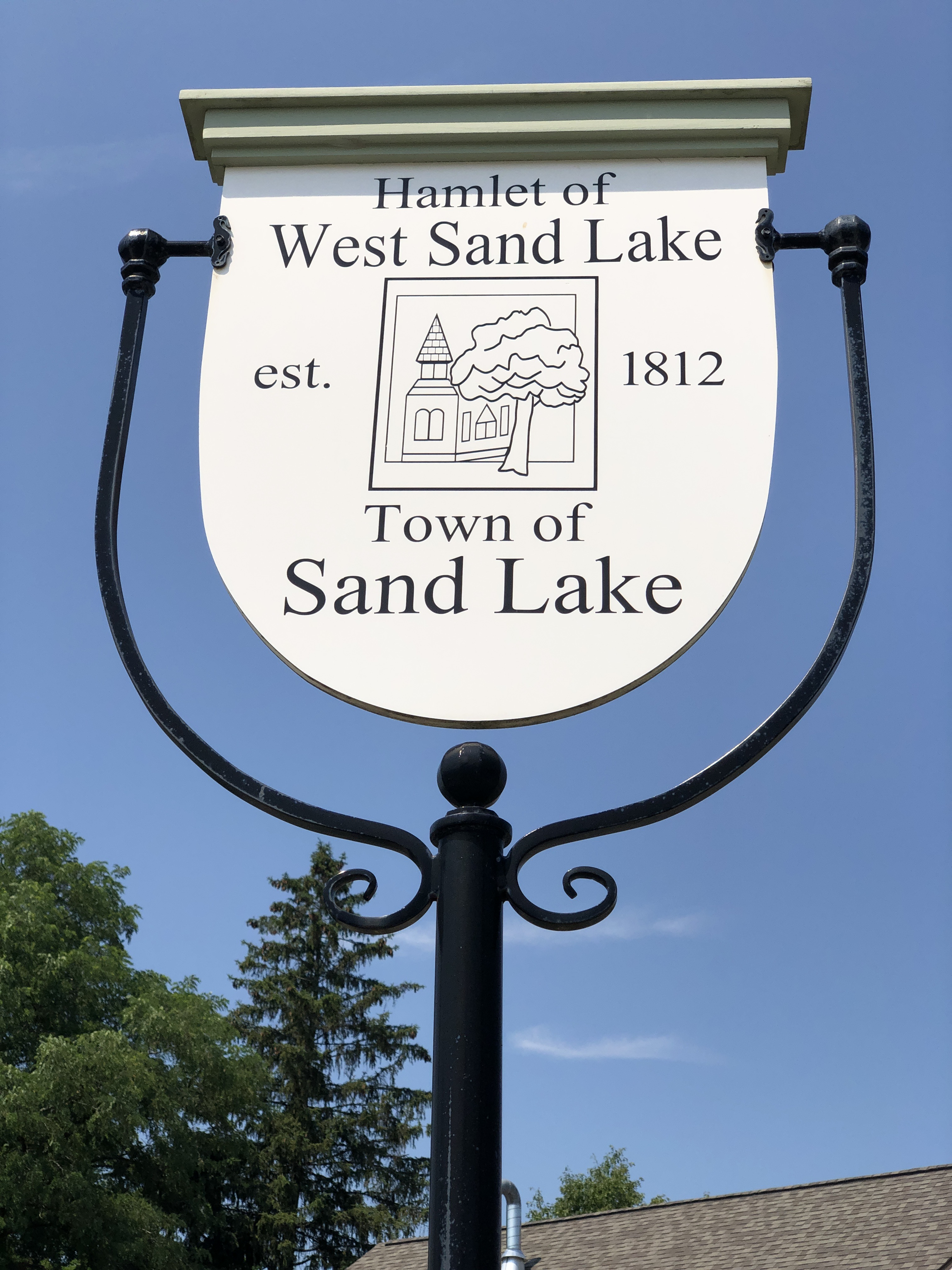
Sign for the Hamlet of West Sand Lake within the Town of Sand Lake, New York

Though the term "hamlet" is not defined under New York law, many people in the state use the term hamlet to refer to a community within a town that is not incorporated as a village but is identified by a name, i.e. an unincorporated community. A hamlet often has a name corresponding to the name of a local school district, post office, or fire district. Because a hamlet has no government of its own, it depends upon the town or towns that contain it for municipal services and government. Because they do not have governments, hamlets have no clear boundaries.

Suffolk County publishes maps that give hamlet boundaries, but towns within the county also publish maps that conflict both in the number of hamlets and their boundaries. Nevertheless, all land not within a village is administered by the town.

Most of the rest of New York's hamlets, however, have less well-defined boundaries, and most towns have areas that are not considered to be a part of any hamlet. The New York State Department of Transportation (NYSDOT) puts hamlet names on rectangular green signs with white lettering at roadside locations of its choosing. The NYSDOT and local governments also provide community identification signs on some scenic byways to be placed at the roadside boundaries of hamlets, as decided by the sign provider. Many towns have special zoning or planning districts and planning strategies for their hamlets, and many places welcome signs at the gateways to the hamlets.

Some hamlets are former villages that have dissolved their incorporation (Old Forge in Herkimer County; Rosendale, in Ulster County; and Andes in Delaware County, for example).

Notwithstanding hamlets are not cities or towns, many of them are called out in formal addresses for those residents residing within the limits. Based on the ZIP Code, the United States Postal Service (USPS) identifies the correct location for mail delivery.

The New York State Gazetteer, published by the New York State Department of Health in 1995, includes a list of hamlets in the state. The criteria used for inclusion in the Gazetteer are not stated.

The Adirondack Park Agency also uses the term "hamlet", though as a land-use classification for private land under its Adirondack Park Land Use and Development Plan (APLUDP). The APLUDP extends the boundaries for its classification of hamlets "well beyond established settlements" to allow for growth.

== Village ==
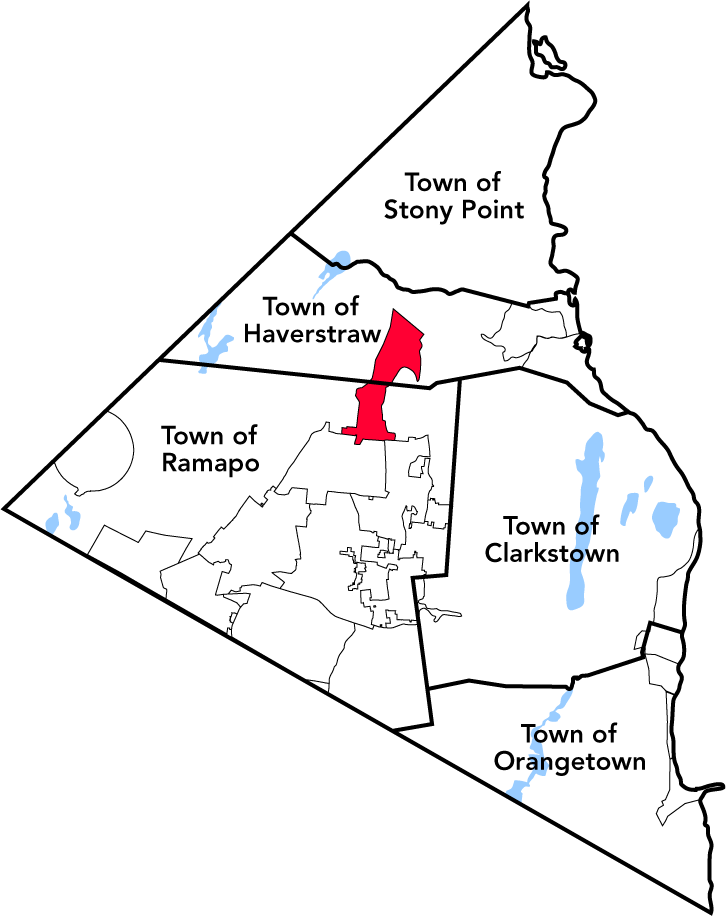
The village of Pomona (red) in Rockland County is partly within two different towns.

In New York, a village is an incorporated area. About 85% of villages fall within a single town. Villages in the State of New York are classified by the Census Bureau as incorporated places. Like all municipal corporations, villages have clearly defined legal boundaries. A village is a municipality that provides services to the residents, services that may or may not include garbage collection, management of cemeteries, street and highway maintenance, street lighting, and building codes. Some villages provide their own police and other municipal services. Villages have less autonomy than cities. While cities are not subject to a town's jurisdiction, villages legally remain part of the town or towns in which they are located. Village residents pay both town and village taxes, and vote in town and village elections. Those services not provided by the village are provided by the town or towns containing the village. As of the 2010 census, 9.83% of the state's population was living in one of the 555 villages in New York.

The legislature of a village is the board of trustees, composed of a mayor and (usually) four trustees. The board is responsible for approving mayoral appointments, managing village finances and property, and approving a budget. The mayor, who is generally the chief executive of the village, may vote in all business before the board and must vote to break a tie. The mayor generally does not possess veto power, unless this is provided for by local law. Administrative duties of the mayor include enforcing laws and supervising employees. A village may also have a full-time village manager who performs these administrative duties instead of the mayor. In 2007, sixty-seven villages had such a manager. Some villages have their own village justice, while others utilize the justice of the town or towns in which they are located.

While most villages are subject to a uniform statewide Village Law, twelve villages operate under charters issued by the state legislature prior to 1874. Before a revision to the State Constitution in that year, villages were formed by the state legislature through granting of charters. Many villages reincorporated, dumping their charters in favor of the Village Law. The villages that retain their charters are Alexander, Carthage, Catskill, Cooperstown, Deposit, Fredonia, Ilion, Mohawk, Ossining, Owego, Port Chester, and Waterford. These villages must still comply with those aspects of Village Law that are not inconsistent with their charters.

To be incorporated, the area of the proposed village must have at least 1,500 inhabitants and not be part of an existing city or village. Additionally, the proposed village can be no more than 5 square miles (13 km^{2}) in area unless its boundaries are to be coterminous with a school, fire, improvement or other district, or the entire town. The process of incorporation begins with a petition by either 20% of residents or owners of 50% of assessed real property. If deemed legally sufficient, incorporation is then voted upon by the qualified voters living in the proposed village only. Some villages have fewer than 500 residents, having incorporated before the present population requirement or fallen below the old 500-resident threshold after incorporation.

A village may also be dissolved, returning all government control to the town level. The process of dissolution can be initiated by the village board itself, or upon the submission of a proper petition to the board. The village board must produce a "dissolution plan" that settles specific matters, such as the village's debts, its employees and property, and the financial impact dissolution would have on village and non-village town residents. This plan is voted upon by village voters only.

About 15% of villages cross other municipal boundaries. More than 70 villages are located in two or more towns. Seven villages are in two counties. The village of Saranac Lake is in three towns and two counties.

Five towns are coterminous with their single village and have a coterminous town-village form of government.

Despite their names, Greenwich Village, the East Village, and Queens Village are not villages, but neighborhoods of the City of New York.

== Divisions unique to New York City ==
=== Boroughs ===
The five boroughs of New York City: 1. Manhattan; 2. Brooklyn; 3. Queens; 4. The Bronx; 5. Staten Island

A borough is one of the five major administrative divisions of the consolidated City of New York. Boroughs do not currently exist elsewhere in the state. Each of the five boroughs of the city is coextensive with a county of the state of New York. Under New York State's General Municipal Law, a borough results when the towns, villages and cities in a county merge with the county itself. This occurred in 1898 when New York City merged with surrounding counties, cities and towns to form its present configuration. The five boroughs are:

- The Bronx (Bronx County)
- Brooklyn (Kings County)
- Manhattan (New York County)
- Queens (Queens County)
- Staten Island (Richmond County)

The boroughs were originally intended to retain some local governance in the consolidated city. Each borough individually elects a borough president and used to elect two at-large city council members, in addition to those elected based on each borough's population. The borough presidents once wielded considerable power as members of the New York City Board of Estimate, but the position is now largely ceremonial and advisory. Boroughs function as counties for certain purposes, but have no county government. The five New York City district attorneys, however, are still elected by county (for example, the district attorney for Brooklyn is called the Kings County District Attorney).

=== Community districts ===
There are fifty-nine community districts in New York City, each represented by an appointed advisory group called a community board. Each board consists of fifty unpaid members appointed by the borough president. Half of the members are nominated by the City Council members who represent the area. The power of the community boards is very limited. They serve in an advisory capacity regarding land use and zoning, budget, and various concerns of the community. The boards can recommend action on the part of the city government, but they cannot mandate it. Each is identified by borough name and a number (e.g. Manhattan Community Board 3).

== School districts ==
School districts are the most common kind of special district in New York. They provide, arrange, or contract for all public education services, including special education and school transportation, the latter also for non-public schools.

School districts are rarely precisely coextensive with the cities, towns, villages, or hamlets that bear the same name, meaning that a person living in one hamlet or village might send their children to a school associated with a different hamlet or village. Residents pay school taxes to the same school district in which they live and any children living with them attend school. All tax-paying residents are eligible for the STAR Program tax rebate, which in effect lessens the value of an individual's primary residence to lessen the tax burden on the residence.

All but five school districts are separate from municipal governments. The exceptions are the five cities whose populations exceed 125,000 (Buffalo, New York, Rochester, Syracuse and Yonkers), in which education is part of the municipal budget.

Schools in the city of New York are controlled by the New York City Department of Education, and the city is divided by the department into 11 "school regions" (10 geographic regions and a "District 75" for students with disabilities)

There are five types of school districts in the state, each with slightly different laws.

=== Common school district ===
Common school districts, established in 1812, were the first type of school district in the state. In July 2004, there were only 11 such districts remaining. They are not authorized to provide secondary education. They must, therefore, contract with neighboring school districts to provide high school education for pupils in the district. Typically one trustee or a three-person board of trustees will govern the district.

=== Union free school district ===
In 1853, the legislature established union free school districts, which are districts resulting from a "union" of two or more common school districts, "free" from the restrictions that previously barred them from operating high schools. In July 2004, there were 163 school districts of this type. Despite being able to operate high schools, thirty-one of these districts provided only elementary education. Those districts that are not components of central school districts provide secondary education either by contracting with other districts or being located in one of the three central high school districts – all three of which are in Nassau County. Each union free school district is governed by a three- to nine-member board of education.

=== Central school district ===
Central school districts are the most prevalent type of school district in New York. In July 2004, there were 460 such districts. They began as a result of legislation in 1914. Central school districts may form from any number (including one) of common, union free, and/or central school districts. Central school districts are permitted to provide secondary education. Its board of education must consist of five, seven, or nine members and length of service must be three, four, or five years, each decided upon by the voters in the district.

=== Central high school district ===
Not to be confused with central school districts, there are only three central high school districts in New York state, all in Nassau County: Bellmore–Merrick Central High School District, Sewanhaka Central High School District, and Valley Stream Central High School District. Central high school districts provide secondary education to students in two or more common or union free districts. With creation authorized by the legislature in 1917 and repealed in 1944, creation was reauthorized exclusively for Suffolk County in 1981. Such districts already established were not affected by the repeal.

=== City school district ===
In those cities with populations exceeding 125,000 (New York City, Buffalo, Yonkers, Rochester, and Syracuse), the city school districts are coterminous with the city limits, and education is part of the municipal budget. These districts cannot incur debts or levy taxes. The governmental structure in all of these except for New York is that of an elected or appointed board of education. New York's public education is headed by a chancellor and has a 13-member all-appointed Department of Education Panel for Education Policy.

The city school districts for the 57 cities having fewer than 125,000 people – such as those serving Binghamton, Elmira, Glen Cove, or Long Beach – are separate from the municipal government and are authorized to levy taxes and incur debt. Each of them is governed by an elected board of education with five, seven, or nine members. Districts for smaller cities often extend beyond the city borders and are referred to as "enlarged city school districts", seven of which have reorganized as "central city school districts".

=== Supervisory school district (BOCES) ===
Owing to the extremely large number (735 in April 2025) of school districts – many of which are quite small, most of them are organized into 37 supervisory districts. Each of these has a Board of Cooperative Educational Services (BOCES). Each BOCES provides services that are considered difficult for the component school districts to provide on their own, often including special classes for students with disabilities, trades, medical professions such as physical therapy or other specialized classes.

== Special purpose units of government ==
In New York, special purpose units of government provide specialized services only to those who live in the district, and are empowered to tax residents of the district for the services provided in common. Special districts often cross the lines of towns, villages, and hamlets, and occasionally cities or counties.

=== Fire district ===
Fire districts are public corporations that generally provide fire protection and other emergency response in towns outside villages. A fire district can levy taxes and incur debt just like other general purpose municipal corporations, although fire districts do not have home rule powers and the taxes are generally collected by the town(s) that the district serves. Fire districts depend on their towns for initial establishment, expansion of district territory, and dissolution, but are otherwise thereafter autonomous political entities able to exercise only those specific powers granted to them by statute. The district is governed by a board of elected commissioners.

Villages generally provide their own fire protection, but joint town-village fire districts are permitted.

==== Joint fire district ====
A Joint Fire District is a fire district that encompasses more than one town – wholly or in part – and may also include a village. This is sometimes done to reduce duplication of services in a small area or to help spread the tax burden when there is a large difference in tax base between neighboring towns. A joint fire district may also be formed when a fire department in a village that has fire protection districts in the surrounding towns separates itself from the village government to obtain greater self-governance. This was seen in 2003 when the fire department in the village of Baldwinsville formed a joint fire district consisting of the village of Baldwinsville and parts of the towns of Lysander and Van Buren in Onondaga County.

There were 868 fire districts in New York at the end of 2003.

=== Fire protection district ===
A fire protection district is established by a town board in order to contract fire protection services with any city, village, fire district or incorporated fire company. Unlike fire districts, fire protection districts are not authorized to levy property taxes and do not have an independently elected board of commissioners. The levy to support fire protection districts is part of the town levy and the oversight of the district is via the town board.

=== Public benefit corporation/authority ===
Public benefit corporations in New York operate like quasi-private corporations, generally with boards appointed by elected officials. They are a form of government bureaucracy in one sense, but – unlike government agencies – are exempt from some regulations. Of particular importance, they can take out their own debt, allowing them to bypass legal limits on state debt. This allows them to make potentially risky capital and infrastructure investments without putting so much of the credit of New York on the line. However, it also allows them to avoid many of the oversight and reporting regulations that apply to state government.

Public benefit corporations get charters from New York and are usually designed to perform a specific, narrow function in the public interest. The Metropolitan Transportation Authority manages public transportation in the New York Metropolitan Area (this includes the New York subway and public bus systems, as well as Metro-North Railroad and the Long Island Rail Road, and the Triborough Bridge and Tunnel Authority). The New York State Thruway Authority originally only maintained the New York State Thruway from New York City to the Pennsylvania border southwest of Buffalo, but now also maintains the toll-free Interstate 287 corridor in the Lower Hudson Valley. Many regions also have authorities to manage their local public transportation such as the Central New York Regional Transportation Authority, which manages public transportation in Onondaga, Oswego, Cayuga, and Oneida counties; and the Capital District Transportation Authority for the Capital District area around Albany, Schenectady, Troy, and Saratoga Springs.

At the end of 2005, there were 866 public benefit corporations, of which 266 were public authorities.

=== Library district ===
Library districts are usually coextensive with the same school district but raise taxes separately and serve all the residents of the library district. They often form cooperative associations with other library districts for shared services, purchasing and cross-library lending. Other library districts (such as the Shelter Rock Library District in central North Hempstead) cover multiple school districts or parts of individual school districts, while some villages (such as Sea Cliff) operate their own municipal library districts; village library districts are typically coterminous with their village boundaries. Library districts are primarily established under the Education Law.

==== Library contract areas ====
Many areas that are not located within a library district contract to receive coverage from a nearby district – such as the Carle Place Contract Area (which is served under contract by the Westbury Library District).

=== Lake Protection and Rehabilitation district ===
Lake Protection and Rehabilitation districts are created to allow local government entities raise additional tax funding for projects in and around lakes. The New York State legislature defines these projects and duties as:

- Initiating and coordinating research and surveys for the purpose of gathering data on the lake, related shorelands, and the drainage basin;
- Planning lake rehabilitation projects;
- Adopting by resolution rules for carrying out their duties and plans for lake rehabilitation projects;
- Contacting and attempting to secure the cooperation of officials of units of general purpose government in the area for the purpose of enacting ordinances deemed necessary by the board of supervisors as furthering the objectives of the district;
- Carrying out lake protection and rehabilitation projects and obtaining any necessary permits therefor; and
- Maintaining liaison with those officials of state government and local government involved in lake protection and rehabilitation.

=== Other types of special purpose units ===
Various other types of special districts exist – or otherwise can be created – in New York.

As of 2026, towns are explicitly authorized under the Town Law to establish:

- Ambulance districts
- Aquatic plant growth control districts
- Beach erosion control districts
- Dock districts
- Drainage districts
- Fallout shelter districts
- Fire alarm districts
- Fire protection districts
- Harbor improvement districts
- Joint fire districts
- Lighting districts
- Park districts
- Public dock districts
- Public parking districts
- Refuse and garbage disposal districts
- Sewage disposal districts
- Sewer districts
- Sidewalk districts
- Snow removal districts
- Wastewater disposal districts
- Water districts
- Water acquisition and storage districts
- Water quality treatment districts
- Water storage and distribution districts
- Water supply districts
- Watershed protection improvement district

Other special-purpose unit districts can be established by towns through a special act of the New York State Legislature. Such districts have included the Fishers Island Ferry District, the former Hicksville Escalator District, and the Chautauqua Utility District.

Some types of special districts – such as police districts – were previously authorized under the Town Law, but have since been stripped, with new such districts requiring a special act of the New York State Legislature; the Port Washington Police District is the only remaining police district in New York as of 2026. Other types of special districts are approved by act of the New York State Legislature to be permissible only in certain jurisdictions – such as duck waste disposal districts, which are exclusively authorized for establishment in Suffolk County.

Counties may also form special districts under the County Law or through an act of the New York State Legislature – such as the Southwest Sewer District in Suffolk County.

== See also ==
- List of states and territories of the United States
- Timeline of town creation in New York's Capital District
