= First Presbyterian Church of Chester =

Historic church in New York, United States

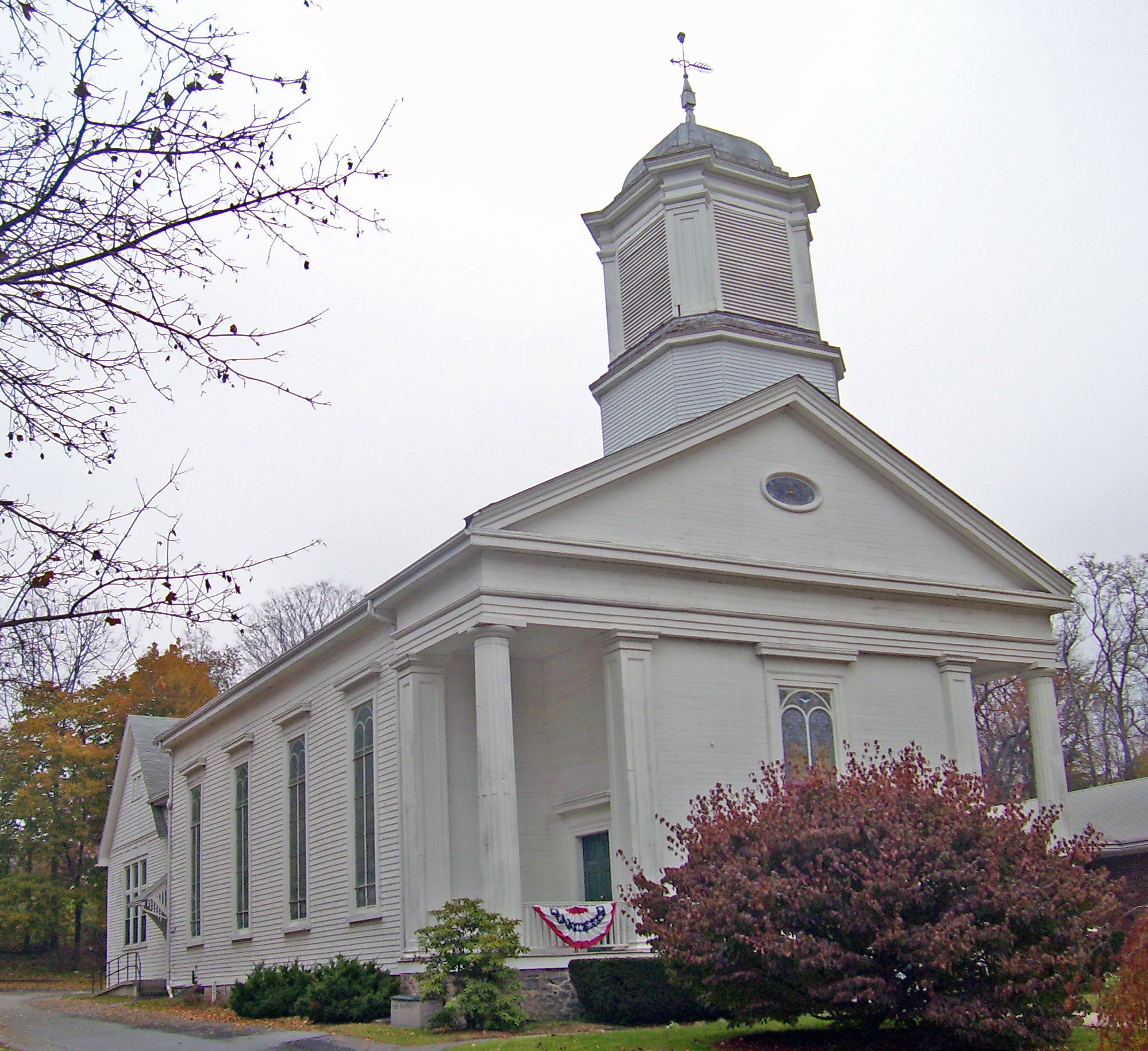
- Church in 2007

Religion
- Affiliation: Presbyterian
- Leadership: The Rev. Erin Moore

Location
- Location: 106-108 Main St., Chester, New York Chester, NY, US
- Interactive map of First Presbyterian Church of Chester
- Coordinates: 41°21′25″N 74°16′39″W

Architecture
- Style: Greek Revival
- Completed: 1854
- Construction cost: $10,000

Specifications
- Direction of façade: east
- Materials: Wood

U.S. National Register of Historic Places
- Added to NRHP: 1998
- NRHP Reference no.: 97001622

Website
- The First Presbyterian Church Chester, NY

The First Presbyterian Church of Chester is a Presbyterian church in Chester. It is located along NY 94 in the eponymous village in Orange County, New York, United States. The current church building, listed on the National Register of Historic Places in 1998, is the third in the history of the congregation, on as many locations. Two additions have been built but the building otherwise remains intact, a well-preserved example of a 19th-century rural American church.

== Building ==
The church is a two-story, three-by-four-bay white timber frame structure in the Greek Revival style. It has a moderately pitched gable metal roof. Since its construction in 1854, it has been added onto twice: a small wood frame chapel in the rear in 1884, and a stone education center in 1967.

The east facade of the church, facing Route 94, is a pedimented portico with paneled corner pilasters and Ionic columns. An octagonal belfry sits atop the roof. Stained glass windows were installed within the church in 1898, and in 1925 an Estey pipe organ was added. Besides those changes the interior of the church has not been altered from its original design.

== History ==
In colonial times there was no church in Chester, and residents traveled to nearby communities where services were held by itinerant ministers. In 1783 one resident, Abijan Yelverton, owner of the neighboring inn, donated an acre (3,920 m^{2}) of land on a knoll about 1,500 feet (455 m) southeast of the present church to be used for a church. The site was cleared and timber cut, but only after the Revolutionary War was over could construction begin. The result was a small, rough cabin that opened for services in 1798 after a little over $3,000 had been spent. The first pastor, Simeon Jones, was hired three years later.

In 1810 the congregation formally became part of the American Presbyterian Church. Nine years later, it had grown enough that a parsonage was necessary, and it was built on land purchased at what is now High Street and Hambletonian Avenue in the village. It would be used as a stop on the Underground Railroad in the years leading to the Civil War.

By 1829 the church itself had outgrown its original building, and built a new one at Oxford and Sugar Loaf roads. Today that site is Chester Cemetery. In 1851, that building had reached its capacity, and a committee chose the current site, part of Anthony Yelverton's estate. The building was dedicated on Christmas Day 1854. Six years later a friend of then-pastor James Wood gave the church a large bell, which would also be used to summon local volunteer firefighters.

The original parsonage was replaced with a new one built on the north of the church in 1893. In 1950, the house on the south side was acquired for use as a manse, and the 1893 parsonage sold to a neighboring funeral home.
