= Palm Tree, New York =

- Town
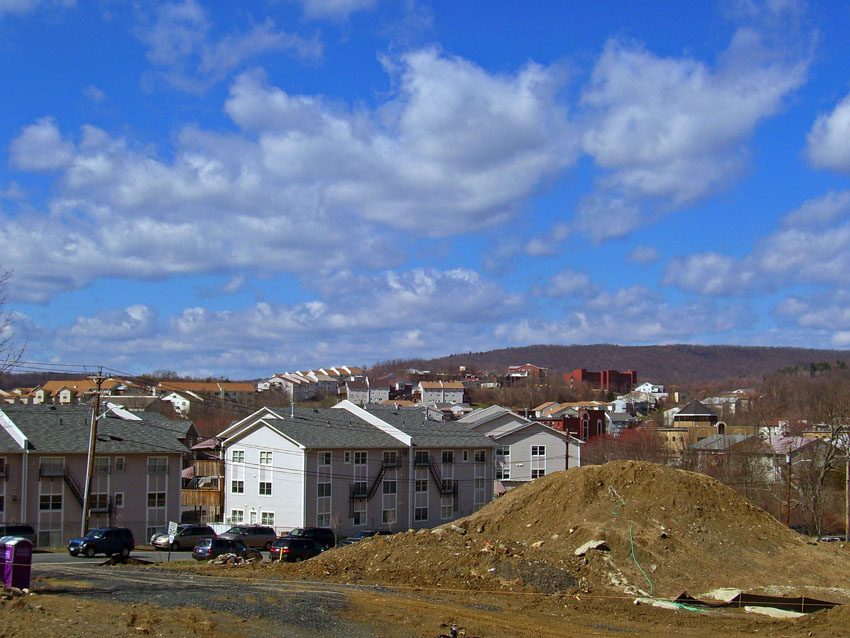
- Kiryas Joel view

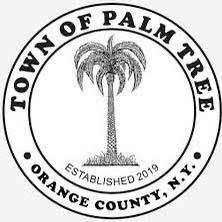
- Seal

- Location in Orange County and the state of New York.

- Location within the state of New York Palm Tree (the United States)
- Coordinates: 41°20′24″N 74°10′2″W
- Country: United States
- State: New York
- County: Orange

Government
  - Supervisor: Abraham Wieder (REP)
  - Council Members: Joshua Blumenthal (CON) Morris Steinberg (DEM) Isaac Glanzer (REP) Gerson Neuman (DEM)

Area
  - Total: 1.50 sq mi (3.89 km^{2})
  - Land: 1.47 sq mi (3.81 km^{2})
  - Water: 0.031 sq mi (0.08 km^{2})
- Elevation: 843 ft (257 m)

Population (2020)
  - Total: 32,954
  - Estimate (2024): 43,863 ▲
  - Density: 22,400/sq mi (8,650/km^{2})
- Time zone: UTC-5 (Eastern (EST))
  - Summer (DST): UTC-4 (EDT)
- Area code: 845
- FIPS code: 36-39853
- GNIS feature ID: 0979938

Palm Tree is a town coterminous with the village of Kiryas Joel, inhabited by the Satmar Hasidic community, formerly part of the town of Monroe. The population of Palm Tree was 32,954 at the 2020 census.

== History ==
The town of Palm Tree, which comprises the entirety of the village of Kiryas Joel, was officially created on January 1, 2019.

Palm Tree had undergone numerous geographic and name changes prior to its incorporation as an independent town in 2019. Until 1764, the area was part of an enlarged Goshen. Goshen was then divided into two parts, with Palm Tree becoming part of Cornwall. By 1799 Cornwall was also divided, with Palm Tree joining present-day Monroe, Woodbury, and Tuxedo to become the town of Cheesekook. This name was changed to Smithfield (or Southfield) and in 1808 became Monroe supposedly in honor of James Monroe; others believe Monroe was named for a local family.

In 1974, the Satmar rebbe Joel Teitelbaum started the Kiryas Joel community, and in 1976 the community was incorporated as the village of Kiryas Joel in remembrance of the Rebbe, as a semi-rural retreat for his Williamsburg, Brooklyn-based community. Over time, the need to annex additional land in order to accommodate Kiryas Joel's burgeoning population created zoning conflicts with the town of Monroe, that eventually led to a referendum which passed overwhelmingly on November 7, 2017, that resulted in a split from Monroe and the creation of the town of Palm Tree, coterminous with the limits of the village of Kiryas Joel.

On June 14, 2018, special legislation was enacted by the New York State Legislature that moved up the target date by one year. The bill was signed by Governor Andrew Cuomo on July 1. The town became official on January 1, 2019, with officials elected in November 2018 being sworn in on that date. No candidates ran for town justice in either the 2018 or 2019 elections; however, two non-resident lawyers were elected as town justices in the November 2019 elections as part of a write-in campaign supported by the leadership of the majority faction of the town's community; while normally New York law requires town justices to be residents of the town, the town's laws were amended to permit the town justices to be non-residents. In the same election, residents voted for a single consolidated town-village government, to be governed as a village rather than a town.

== Etymology ==
Palm Tree was chosen as the new town's name as it is a calque of Teitelbaum, the surname of the rebbes of Satmar. It means "date palm" - formed from teitel (date) and baum (tree).

== Geography ==
According to the United States Census Bureau, the town has a total area of 1.5 square miles (3.9 km^{2}), and only a very small portion of the area (a small duck pond called "Forest Road Lake" in the center of the town) is covered with water.

== Demographics ==
Historical population
Census	Pop.	Note	%±
2020	32,954		—
2024 (est.)	43,863		33.1%
United States Census Bureau:

Largest ancestries (2000)	Percent
Hungarian	18.9%
American	8.0%
Israeli	3.0%
Romanian	2.0%
Polish	1.0%
Czech	0.3%
Russian	0.3%
German	0.2%

Languages (2010)	Percent
Spoke Yiddish at home	91.5%
Spoke only English at home	6.3%
Spoke Hebrew at home	2.3%
Spoke English "not well", or "not at all"	46.0%

Palm Tree began with a 2019 founding population of 26,905 people, but since it has the same boundaries as its coterminous village of Kiryas Joel, its demographics from before its incorporation as a town is also known. As of the census of 2000, there were 13,138 people, 2,229 households, and 2,137 families residing in the village. The population density was 11,962.2 inhabitants per square mile (4,618.6/km^{2}). There were 2,233 housing units, at an average density of 2,033.2 units per square mile (785.0 units/km^{2}). The racial make-up of the village was 99.02% White, 0.21% African American, 0.02% Asian, 0.12% from other races, and 0.63% from two or more races. Hispanic or Latino of any race were 0.93% of the population.

Kiryas Joel has the highest percentage of people who reported Hungarian ancestry in the United States, as 18.9% of the population reported Hungarian ancestry in 2000. 3% of the residents of Kiryas Joel were Israeli, 2% Romanian, 1% Polish, and 1% European.

The 2000 census also reported that 6.3% of village residents spoke only English at home, one of the lowest such percentages in the United States. 91.5% of residents spoke Yiddish at home, while 2.3% spoke Hebrew. Of the Yiddish-speaking population in 2000, 46% spoke English "not well" or "not at all". Overall, including those who primarily spoke Hebrew and European languages, as well as primary Yiddish speakers, 46% of Kiryas Joel residents speak English "not well" or "not at all".

There were 2,229 households, out of which 79.5% had children under the age of 18 living with them, 93.2% were married couples living together, 1.6% had a female householder with no husband present, and 4.1% were non-families. 2.8% of all households were made up of individuals, and 2.1% had someone living alone who was 65 years of age or older. The average household size was 5.74, and the average family size was 5.84. In the village, the population was very young, with 57.5% under the age of 18, 17.2% from 18 to 24, 16.5% from 25 to 44, 7.2% from 45 to 64, and 1.6% who were 65 years of age or older. The median age was 15 years. For every 100 females, there were 116.3 males. For every 100 females age 18 and over, there were 118.0 males.

The village abides by strict Jewish customs, and its welcome sign (installed in 2010) asks visitors to dress conservatively and to "maintain gender separation in all public areas". However, "the signs [say] nothing about consequences for violating these guidelines – because there are no consequences."

== See also ==
- Kaser, New York − a majority Hasidic village in neighboring Rockland County.
- New Square, New York − a majority Hasidic village in a neighboring Rockland County.
- Hasidic Judaism
- South Blooming Grove, New York − adjacent community formed to stop the expansion of Kiryas Joel, that nevertheless received a large influx of the Hasidic community
