= Hicksville Escalator District =

Coordinates: 40.77°N 73.51°W

District overview
- Formed: September 15, 1964
- Dissolved: October 30, 1979
- Type: Special district
- Jurisdiction: Greater Hicksville, New York, United States
- Status: Defunct
- Parent agency: Town of Oyster Bay

The Hicksville Escalator District was a controversial special district in the Town of Oyster Bay, in Nassau County, New York, United States. Its purpose was to operate and maintain two escalators at the Long Island Rail Road's Hicksville station in Hicksville.

Throughout the district's existence, it was the subject of bipartisan criticism by both taxpayers and government officials, who cited the district's inefficiencies, taxpayer cost burdens, and maintenance issues, amongst other things.

== History ==
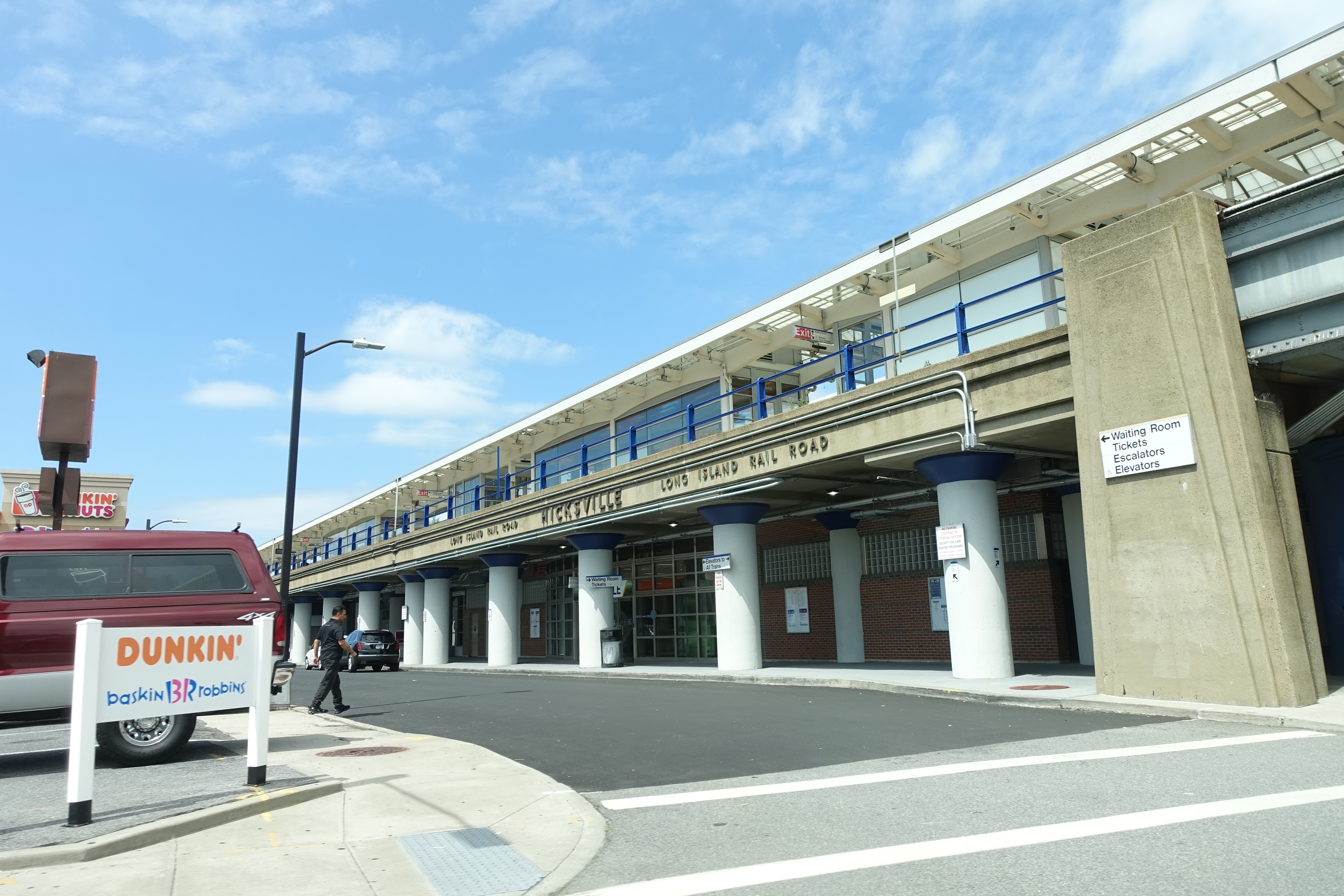
The Hicksville LIRR station in 2022

The Hicksville Escalator District was established on September 15, 1964, as a result of the reconstruction of the Hicksville station; the station, which had previously been at-grade, was raised onto an elevated structure through a grade crossing elimination project executed by the New York Public Service Commission. The district was created by the Town of Oyster Bay in order to pay for & maintain the rebuilt station's two escalators between the street and the platforms. The escalators went into service in 1966.

Not long after the establishment of the district and the installation of the escalators, issues over costs & maintenance arose. Disputes between the town and the Metropolitan Transportation Authority hindered the district's ability to adequately maintain the escalators, which were subjected to frequent, chronic breakdowns and were poorly shielded from the elements. In an attempt to mitigate weather-related breakdowns, the escalators were enclosed by the town in 1969 to shield them from the elements, but chronic breakdowns and other issues persisted.

By January 1977, seeking to abolish the district and allow the escalators to be maintained more efficiently, Oyster Bay officials were negotiating with the Metropolitan Transportation Authority for that agency to purchase the escalators for $1; this would enable the district's elimination, the town's taxpayers to be relieved of the cost burdens, and the improvement in the station's efficiency. That May, the Oyster Bay Town Board voted in favor of this proposal, spearheaded by Town Supervisor John Colby. The extensive talks between the town and the MTA broke down later that year, as a result of the MTA demanding the town first repair the escalators to a state of good repair – and pay for the replacement the handrails – before the execution of the transfer could be completed; this dispute coincided with the town spending $40,000 (1978 USD) to repair the steps on the escalators. The prerequisite was viewed by town officials & taxpayers as an undue tax burden upon district residents, as then-Deputy Town Supervisor Robert Schmidt stated in a 1978 Newsday article on the matter. Schmidt also argued that, as a significant amount of passengers at the station – the LIRR's busiest east of Jamaica – resided outside of the district, it would be more appropriate for the MTA to own, operate, and maintain the escalators; district residents were paying an escalator tax of 1.4 cents per $100 in valuation at the time. It was further argued by Supervisor Colby that it was more appropriate for the MTA to assume ownership & maintenance responsibilities than leave them to the town, as the escalators were a service for commuters at an MTA-owned train station, served by an MTA-operated commuter railroad.

By February 1978, bills in the New York State Legislature were proposed as a result of the breakdown in negotiations between the town and the MTA, which spurred the need for legislative action to settle the matter; the bills would effectively dissolve the district and transfer the escalators' ownership & maintenance responsibilities to the MTA – and would also enable that agency to replace them. The bills also allowed for the allocation of up to $700,000 (1978 USD) for the installation of escalators at the Floral Park, Lynbrook, and Valley Stream stations. The bills received bipartisan support and subsequently passed; Senator Norman J. Levy (R–Merrick) sponsored the State Senate bill, while Assemblyman Lewis J. Revoli (D–Old Bethpage) – a vocal critic of the district – sponsored the State Assembly bill. About this time, Levy also sponsored a separate bill to abolish the Baldwin Escalator District – a similar district in Baldwin to maintain that community's station's escalators and the only other such district in Nassau County.

On October 30, 1979, with the New York State Legislature's approval, the MTA took over control of the station's escalator's from the district. At the time, district residents were paying an escalator tax of 1.9 cents per $100 in valuation – an increase from a tax of 1.4 cents per $100 in valuation in 1976, caused by rising maintenance costs. That same day, upon the transfer, the Hicksville Escalator District officially dissolved.

== Governance and operations ==
The Hicksville Escalator District was governed by the Town of Oyster Bay. It was funded through taxes on properties located within the district's boundaries. The district's expenditures included paying for the construction and maintenance of the escalators – in addition to the salary of one full-time escalator serviceman.

=== District boundaries ===
The Hicksville Escalator District's boundaries

The boundaries of the Hicksville Escalator District included approximately all of Hicksville proper – in addition to portions of Bethpage, Jericho, Plainview, and Syosset – including portions of Locust Grove.

== See also ==
- Special districts in New York (state)
- Great Neck Park District
- Manhasset Park District
- Port Washington Parking District
- History of the Long Island Rail Road
