= Monroe Race Track =

Harness racing facility in Monroe, New York

Monroe Race Track was a 1/2 mile harness racing facility that opened in 1908 in Monroe, New York to a crowd of 2,200 people. The first president was Max O. Schaefer, general manager of the Monroe Cheese Company, and later president of the Velveeta Cheese Company. The track became a part of the Orange County Harness Racing Circuit which included Endicott, Middletown, Goshen, and Monroe until 1927, when Monroe was dropped by the circuit and was replaced by Elmira, New York which had just completed construction of a new 5,000 seat grandstand. In 1964 the grandstands were demolished and the track faded into history.

The track course remains in an undeveloped area of the village. It is a contributing property to the Village of Monroe Historic District, listed on the National Register of Historic Places in 1998.
