= Cheesecocks Patent =

The Cheesecock, or Cheesecock Patent, was a vast tract of land that seven English colonists bought from Iroquois Indians in 1702. It included the southern part of what became Orange County, New York State, that now covers the towns of Monroe and Tuxedo and extends over part of Rockland County, which was separated from Orange County in 1798.

A variant of the name is still applied to Cheesecote Mountain, Rockland County. As derived from Unami/Delaware (Algonkian) language, its source was formerly reported as unclear, but William Bright, in Native American Placenames of the United States, suggests, for the related name Cheesequake (some miles south in New Jersey) chiskhake, "land that has been cleared".

The Patent was purchased from the Indians under terms of a land grant of Queen Anne, the warrant for its "drawing" signed in Common Council of the Colony of New York, 20 March 1707, confirmed by letters patent in the name of Queen Anne dated 25 March 1707. The patentees applied to Charles Clinton to make a survey of the tract and to allot it among the owners.

This survey was begun in 1735 and not finished until 1749. The lots were partitioned. 23 February 1737/38. The “marble covered field book” of the surveyor, Charles Clinton, contains a record of the partition of the lots of Cheesecocks among the owners in 1738, divided in sevenths: William Smith (2/7 interest); James Alexander (1/7 interest); Smith and Alexander (1/7 interest); Philip Livingston (1/7 interest); John Chambers (1/7 interest) and John McEvers and Catherine Symes (1/7 interest).

The lots were surveyed into lots approximately 150 acres (0.61 km^{2}) each, and a description of the quality of the land and the availability of water was included in the description of each lot. The town of Monroe, New York, was laid out in 1799, as Cheesecocks.

Clinton's survey laid out allotments four and a quarter miles southward of the line. "Clinton's Old Line", as it came to be called, occasioned disputes between New York, to the northeast, and New Jersey to the southwest, though Clinton's line was never intended as a division line. The division of the original tract among patentees is conserved in the New York State Library, among the Sterling Iron and Railway Company records.

== See also ==
- Wawayanda Patent
- Holland Patent, New York
