= Coterminous municipality =

Form of local government in some U.S. states

A coterminous municipality, sometimes also known as a coterminous city or a coterminous town-village, is a form of local government in some U.S. states in which a municipality and one or more civil townships have partial or complete consolidation of their government functions. A term used for the formation of such a local government is "township and municipal consolidation." This form of local government is distinct from a municipality coterminous with a higher level of government, which is called a consolidated city-county or a variation of that term.

== Connecticut ==
The entire area of Connecticut is divided into towns. Cities and boroughs are within town areas, and their governments may or may not be consolidated with those of the towns in which they are located.

== Illinois ==
The Illinois Township Code includes provisions for a municipality coextensive with a township. Such a municipality is known variously as a coterminous city and a coterminous municipality, and the township is called a coterminous township; the term "consolidated city-township" does not appear in either the Township Code or the Municipal Code. The Township Code provides for the discontinuance of township organization within such a coterminous municipality.

== New York ==
In New York, such a local government is called a coterminous town-village and is governed under Article 17 of the New York Village Law. It is never called a consolidated city-township because New York's cities, as opposed to its villages, exist outside of town areas.

Six towns are coterminous with their single village: Green Island in Albany County; East Rochester in Monroe County; Palm Tree in Orange County and Scarsdale, Harrison and Mount Kisco in Westchester County. When such an entity is formed, officials from either unit of government may serve in both village and town governments simultaneously. A referendum is held to decide whether residents prefer a village-style or town-style government, which will then function primarily as a village or town but will perform some of the functions of the other form. Green Island has both a Village and a Town government, but the Town government's functions are limited. The rest have unified Town/Village governments.

Palm Tree, which is coterminous with the village of Kiryas Joel, is the only instance where the town and village have different names.

There are also two cases wherein a single village is nearly coterminous with a town: the Village of Woodbury within the Town of Woodbury, and the Village of Tuxedo within the Town of Tuxedo. In the case of Woodbury, the village consists of Woodbury Election Districts 1 through 8 and 10 through 13, with District 9 being part of the neighboring Village of Harriman. In the case of Tuxedo, the village and the town have a unified government, although the town has more territory than the village (consisting of Election Districts 1, 2, and 4) due to the Village of Tuxedo Park also existing within the town (Election District 3).

== See also ==
- Charter township
- Paper township
