= Monroe, New York =

Town in Orange County, New York, US

Coordinates: 41°19′26″N 74°11′13″W

- Town
- Town of Monroe
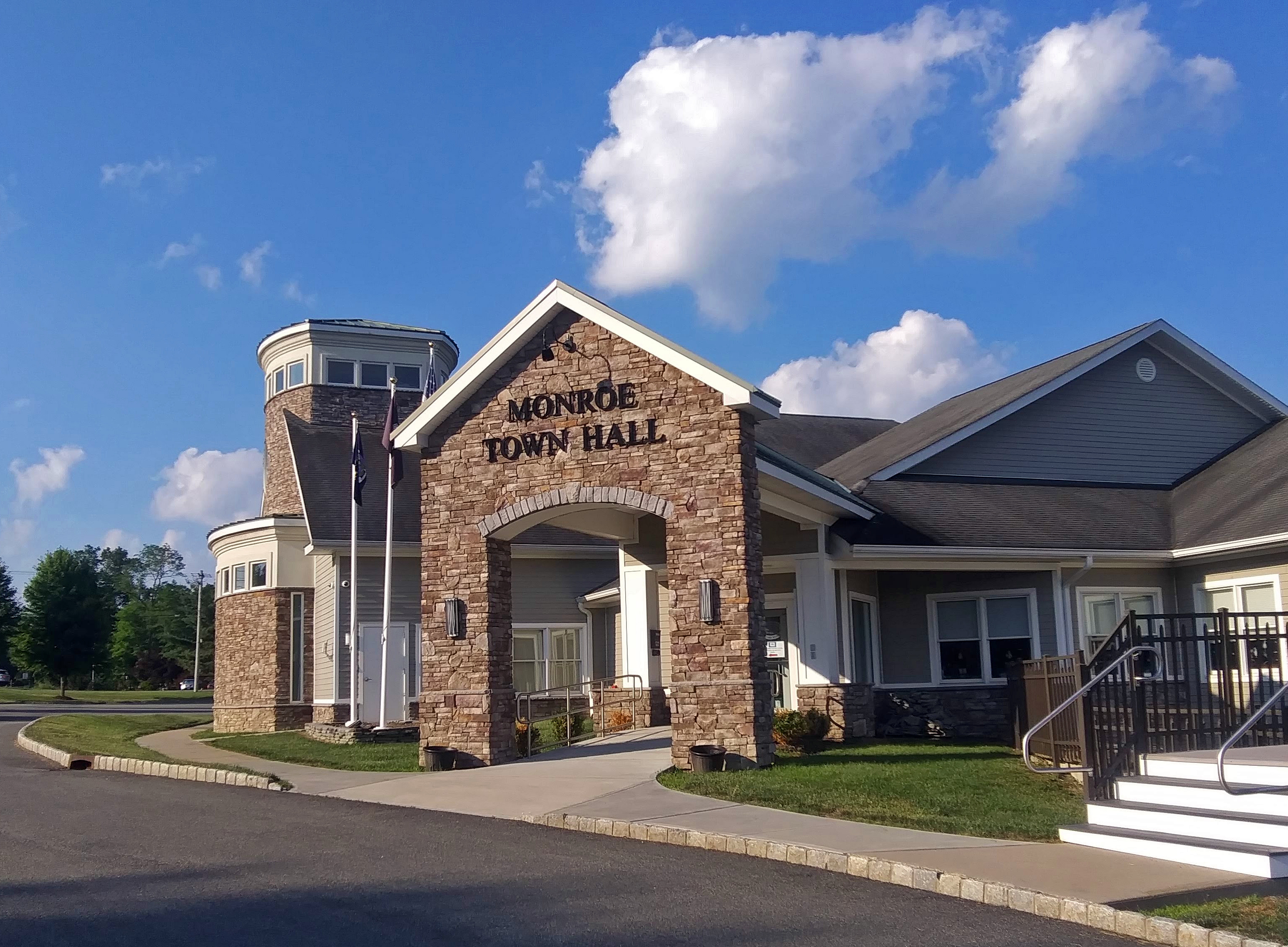
- Town hall

- Location in Orange County and the state of New York; map shown does not reflect separation of Palm Tree from Monroe.

- Location within New York Location within the United States
- Country: United States
- State: New York
- County: Orange
- Named for: James Monroe

Area
  - Total: 21.3 sq mi (55.1 km^{2})
  - Land: 20.1 sq mi (52.0 km^{2})
  - Water: 1.2 sq mi (3.1 km^{2})
- Elevation: 554 ft (169 m)

Population (2020)
  - Total: 21,387
  - Estimate (2025): 24,343 ▲
  - Density: 1,210/sq mi (468/km^{2})
- Time zone: UTC-5 (Eastern (EST))
  - Summer (DST): UTC-4 (EDT)
- ZIP code: 10950
- Area code: 845
- Website: monroeny.org

Monroe is a town in Orange County, New York, United States. The population was 21,387 at the 2020 census, compared to 39,912 at the 2010 census; the significant fall in census population was due to the secession of the town of Palm Tree in 2019. The town is named after President James Monroe.

== History ==
The first settlers to this land were American Indians from the Leni-Lenape Indian nation. The Leni-Lenape nation consisted of three tribes: the Unulactus, the turkey tribe; Minsis, the wolf tribe; and the Unamis, the turtle tribe. As white settlers started to move north, the Leni-Lenape were forced to move west, out of New York and New Jersey into Pennsylvania and later into central North America, under the treaty of Easton, a colonial agreement signed in October 1758. The British colonial government of the province of Pennsylvania and the Native American tribes in the Ohio country signed this document stating they would be allies in the French and Indian War.

In the early 1700s the lower Hudson Valley region was being mapped out to be divided up under the crown. On March 25, 1707, the "Chessecocks Patent was granted by Queen Anne". The patent confirmed deeds that had been previously acquired by purchase directly from the Leni-Lenape nation. The patent was given to seven people, six men and one woman. Cheesecocks as a precinct included all of present-day Monroe, Palm Tree, Woodbury, Tuxedo, and Stony Point. Many of the patentees never saw the land they bought or were given. Many of the new settlers to come with the Cheesecocks patent were Dutch and English. Both groups of settlers came from Long Island for the rich natural resources.

The original name for the area on the Ramapo River, surveyed by General Washington's geographer and surveyor Robert Erskine, was Smith's Mill, described by Erskine as being "on a sudden bend of the Ramapo." This site still contains the ruins of the grist mill built in 1741 by David Smith, the first settler (Map of Orange and Rockland Counties Area laid down by R. Erskine 1778–1779). The Clove Road, which led from Haverstraw, home of Sir William Smith, up through Tuxedo and the rocky defile known by the Dutch word "kloof", for Clove, was vital to the American cause during the Revolutionary War. It was unknown to the British patrolling the Hudson and gave Washington his escape route from New York to his New Windsor headquarters. Created on March 23, 1799 The town was first named Cheescock's (from the Algonquin words chis, meaning "up", and kauk, meaning "land", together signifying "upland"), it was renamed Southfields in 1802, and on April 6, 1808, it took its present name of Monroe (originally spelled Munroe, popularized as Monroe, c. 1818).

Quoting from Gen George Washington's daily journal:

July 15, [1777]. To Sovereign (Suffern's or Suffren's) Tavern, near the entrance to Smith's Clove. On Sunday, July 20, 1777, Washington has moved on northward into the Ramapo Valley and to the place then known as Galloway's, which is now the village of Southfields (Belcher, p. 81).

David Smith, a prosperous miller of Smithtown, Long Island, bought land from one of the original patentees, Philip Livingston. Smith "purchased lot 43, consisting of 276 acres. He built the first home." Smith built a dam and a grist mill on the Ramapo River, which created the Mill Pond of today, as well as homes for himself and his four sons.

In 1889, a further division of the town resulted in a loss of territory to the towns of Woodbury and Tuxedo. In 1894, the community of Monroe set itself apart from the town by incorporating as a village.

The explosive growth of the Hasidic Jewish village of Kiryas Joel from its establishment in the 1970s, which led to a majority of the town's population being in the village by 2017, resulting in political conflicts, mostly over zoning. Negotiations led to an agreement that Kiryas Joel would split from Monroe and become its own town, subject to voter approval in a November 2017 referendum. With the initiative receiving overwhelming approval, Kiryas Joel became the new town of Palm Tree. The new town was originally set to be created in 2020, but a bill was passed by the New York state legislature and signed into law by Governor Andrew Cuomo that officially established Palm Tree on January 1, 2019.

=== Seven Springs proposal ===
About 600 Hasidic landowners and residents left outside Palm Tree's boundaries by the compromise accepted in the 2017 referendum proposed the following year to create another village, Seven Springs, on 2 square miles (5.2 km^{2}) in the town between Palm Tree and the village of Monroe. Other residents were opposed to the plan, as well as the government of Palm Tree, which filed its own annexation petition for some of the same land along Route 17. The Seven Springs incorporation petition was also rejected by the town. A county Supreme Court judge ruled in 2019 that the Seven Springs petition had preceded the Palm Tree one; a year later she further held that Monroe had improperly rejected it. Both decisions were upheld in 2023.

At the end of 2023 Governor Kathy Hochul signed a bill written by state senator James Skoufis, formerly a town councilman in neighboring Woodbury, who had been active in that town's incorporation as a village to prevent any annexations by Kiryas Joel. The new law tripled the state's requirements for incorporating villages from 500 potential residents to 1,500, and required a study to be done on the financial and governmental impacts of creating a village on the surrounding town, provisions that were seen as fatal to Seven Springs. The attorney for the residents seeking to create the village said he would challenge the new law in court as a violation of the federal and state constitutions.

=== Cheeses ===
The town is the birthplace of Velveeta and Liederkranz cheese. Each year, a cheese festival is held to honor the former and the noble history (and unfortunate death) of the latter. It also was the original home of the Orange and Rockland Electric Company, founded by Roscoe W. Smith, a descendant of David Smith.

=== Fire of 1895 ===
On the night of March 17, 1895, the village of Monroe had one of the most disastrous fires in its history, in which the center of the village was nearly wiped out. "The total losses of real estate were three large business places, three barns, a storehouse, several sheds and smaller buildings valued altogether at $25,000. Personal property, goods-in stock and furniture destroyed were valued at $15,000". It was said that people from all over took the Erie Railroad to come see the remains of the "Big Fire". A short time after the fire the Village decided to install a water works system which would be owned by the Village. "On July 24, 1895 the Mombasha Fire Company was organized. The Hook and Ladder Company was organized on October 4, 1895. In 1898 the two Companies consolidated as the Mombasha Fire Company".

=== Harness racing ===
In the early 1900s the Monroe Race Track was established to "increase the towns popularity as both local residents and visitors flocked to the track to watch the horse races and place bets on the trotters". The first race was held on August 8, 1908, there was 22,000 people estimated at the race. The track became a part of the Orange County Harness Racing Circuit which included Endicott, Middletown, Goshen, and Monroe. "The first grandstand was located on the long side of the track, while the second grandstand wasn't completed until 1910. It was seventy-five feet long and could hold one thousand people." The track was in operation 19 years. "On August 13, 1913 the race track record was set with a time of 2:04¼ minutes for the mile pace on a half mile track. At this time this was also a world record for a pacer." In 1927 Monroe was dropped by the circuit and was replaced by one in Elmira, New York, where construction of a new 5,000 seat grandstand had been completed. The last purse offered at Monroe Track in 1927 was for $31,000. In 1964 the grandstands of the track were torn down.

== Geography ==
According to the United States Census Bureau, the town has a total area of 21.3 square miles (55 km^{2}), of which 20.1 square miles (52 km^{2}) is land and 1.2 square miles (3.1 km^{2}) (5.55%) is water.

The town is located in the southern region of the county, bordered on the northwest by the town of Chester, on the north by the town of Blooming Grove, on the northeast by the town of Palm Tree, on the east by the town of Woodbury, on the south by the town of Tuxedo, and on the southwest by the town of Warwick.

NY-17 (future I-86), combined with U.S. Highway 6 NY-17M, passes through Monroe village.

Lakes

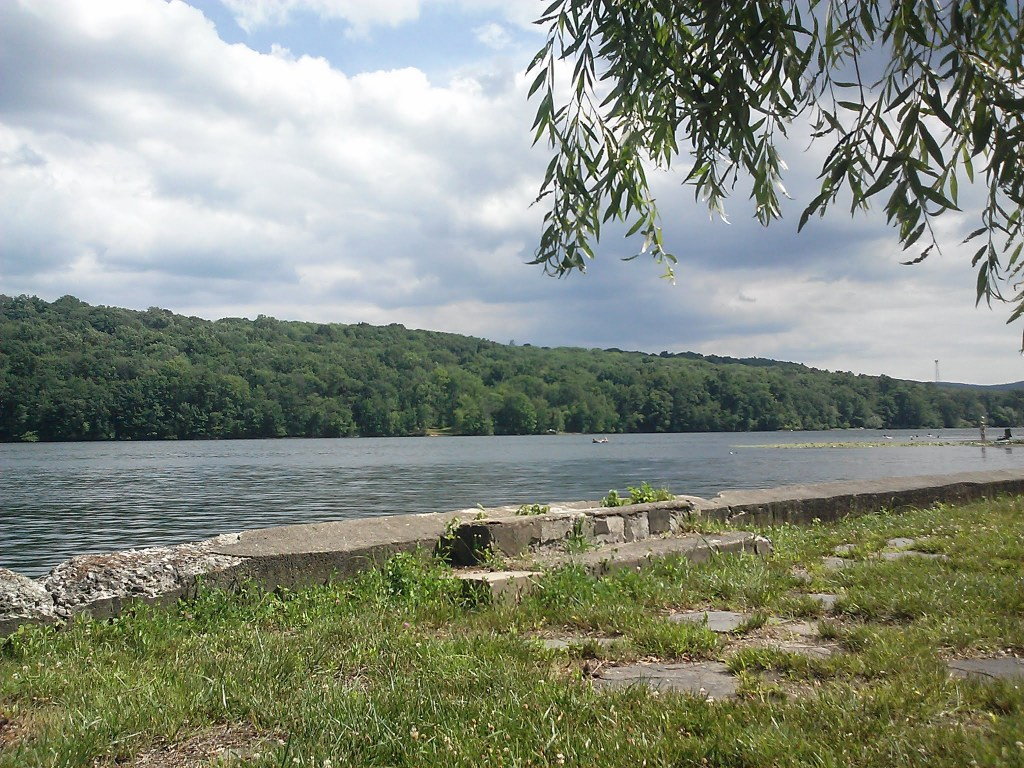
Walton Lake

- Mombasha Lake – a lake by the southern town line.
- Round Lake – a lake in the western part of Monroe, southwest of Monroe village.
- Walton Lake – a lake in the western part of Monroe, south of Round Lake.

Communities

Communities within the town of Monroe:

- Harriman – the village of Harriman is partly in the town.
- Marycrest – community bordering the southern part of Monroe village.
- Monroe – the village of Monroe is located south of NY-17 on highway NY-17M.
- Mountain House – a location by the northern town line.
- Newburgh Junction – a hamlet south of Harriman on NY-17.
- Walton Park – part of the hamlet of Walton Park.

== Demographics ==
Historical population
Census	Pop.	Note	%±
1820	2,969		—
1830	3,671		23.6%
1840	3,914		6.6%
1850	4,280		9.4%
1860	3,975		−7.1%
1870	4,666		17.4%
1880	5,096		9.2%
1890	1,694		−66.8%
1900	1,784		5.3%
1910	2,285		28.1%
1920	2,630		15.1%
1930	3,000		14.1%
1940	3,302		10.1%
1950	3,714		12.5%
1960	5,965		60.6%
1970	9,169		53.7%
1980	14,948		63.0%
1990	23,035		54.1%
2000	31,411		36.4%
2010	39,912		27.1%
2020	21,387		−46.4%
2025 (est.)	24,343		13.8%
U.S. Decennial Census

As of the census of 2000, there were 31,407 people, 8,228 households, and 6,878 families residing in the town. The population density was 1,563.5 people per square mile (603.7 people/km^{2}). There were 8,517 housing units at an average density of 424.0 per square mile (163.7/km^{2}). The racial makeup of the town was 94.91% white, 1.22% Black or African American, 0.25% Native American, 1.36% Asian, 1.15% from other races, and 1.10% from two or more races. Hispanic or Latino of any race were 4.91% of the population. 12.6% were of Italian, 12.4% Irish, 9.2% Hungarian, 6.0% American and 5.6% German ancestry according to Census 2000.

There were 8,228 households, out of which 53.6% had children under the age of 18 living with them, 74.3% were married couples living together, 6.3% had a female householder with no husband present, and 16.4% were non-families. 13.2% of all households were made up of individuals, and 5.2% had someone living alone who was 65 years of age or older. The average household size was 3.72 and the average family size was 4.14.

In the town, the population was spread out, with 41.5% under the age of 18, 11.6% from 18 to 24, 24.8% from 25 to 44, 16.2% from 45 to 64, and 5.8% who were 65 years of age or older. The median age was 22 years. For every 100 females, there were 107.9 males. For every 100 females age 18 and over, there were 103.3 males.

The median income for a household in the town was $50,889, and the median income for a family was $54,315. Males had a median income of $51,125 versus $34,547 for females. The per capita income for the town was $16,569. About 22.3% of families and 29.1% of the population were below the poverty line, including 39.6% of those under age 18 and 10.9% of those age 65 or over.

== Notable people ==
- David Bernsley (born 1969), American-Israeli basketball player
- Malcolm Bricklin (born 1939), American businessman
- Justin Barcia (born 1992) 2 time AMA 250 Supercross champion
- Chloe Chambers (born 2004), Chinese-born racing driver
