= Monroe (village), New York =

Monroe, New York
- Village
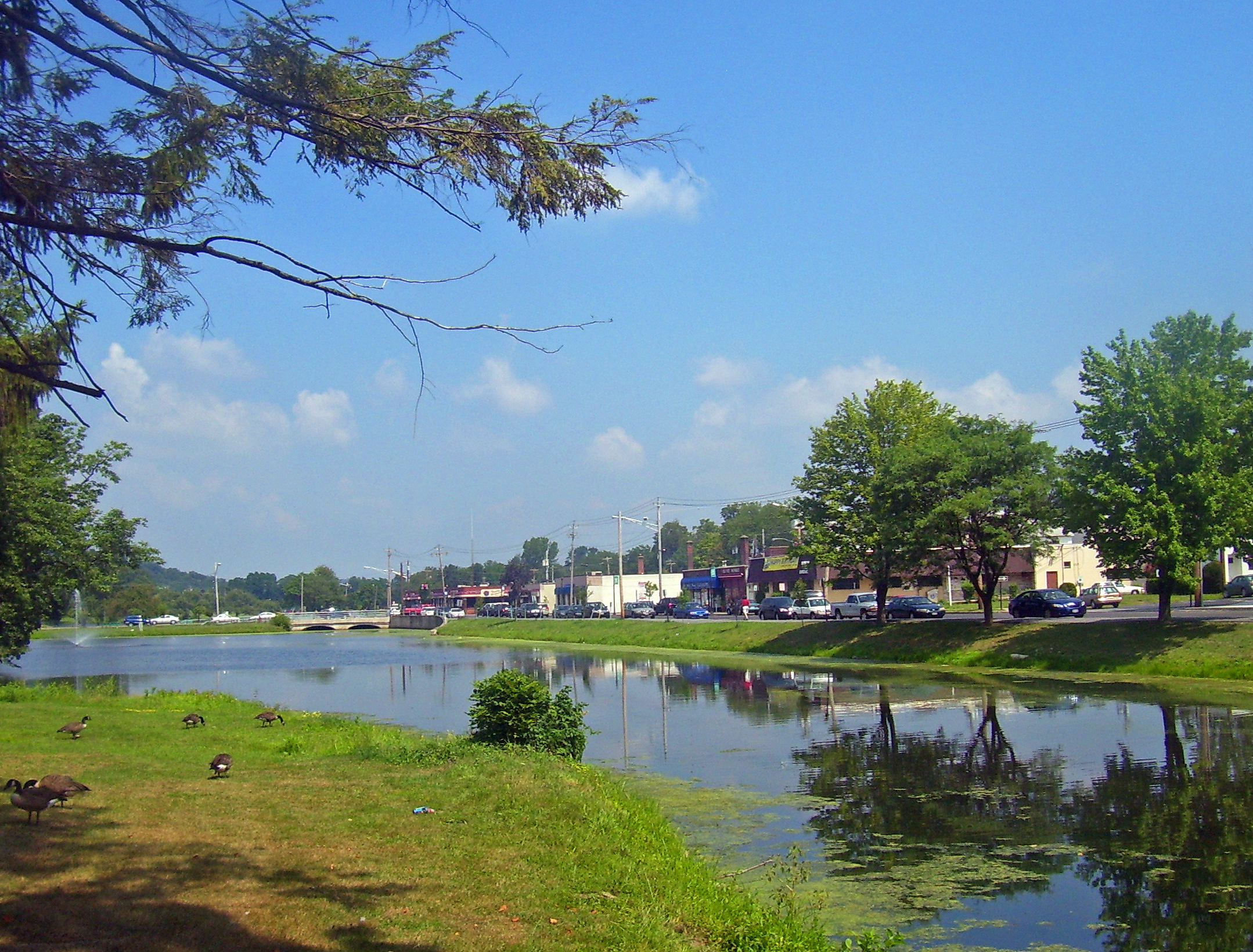
- Downtown Monroe, with mill pond and park in foreground
- Etymology: From Peter Jay Munroe, state senator
- Location in Orange County and the state of New York.

- Location of New York in the United States
- Coordinates: 41°19′27″N 74°11′13″W
- Country: United States
- State: New York
- County: Orange
- Settled: 1741
- Incorporated: 1894

Government
  - Mayor: Alex Melchiorre

Area
  - Total: 3.56 sq mi (9.21 km^{2})
  - Land: 3.49 sq mi (9.05 km^{2})
  - Water: 0.066 sq mi (0.17 km^{2})
- Elevation: 600 ft (180 m)
- Highest elevation (Bald Hill (Monroe, New York)): 890 ft (270 m)
- Lowest elevation: 540 ft (160 m)

Population (2020)
  - Total: 9,343
  - Density: 2,674.5/sq mi (1,032.64/km^{2})
- Time zone: UTC-5 (Eastern (EST))
  - Summer (DST): UTC-4 (EDT)
- ZIP Code: 10950
- Area codes: 845
- FIPS code: 36-47988
- GNIS feature ID: 0957528
- Wikimedia Commons: Monroe, New York
- Website: Village of Monroe

Monroe is a village in Orange County, New York, United States. The population was 9,343 at the 2020 census. It is part of the Kiryas Joel–Poughkeepsie–Newburgh, NY Metropolitan Statistical Area as well as the larger New York–Newark–Bridgeport, NY-NJ-CT-PA Combined Statistical Area. The community is not named after President James Monroe, but rather after an early 19th-century New York state senator.

The Village of Monroe is in the northwestern part of the Town of Monroe by NY Route 17 (soon to be Interstate 86) and US 6. NY 17M is its main street.

== Geography ==
Monroe is located at 41°19′25″N 74°11′16″W (41.323786, -74.187969).

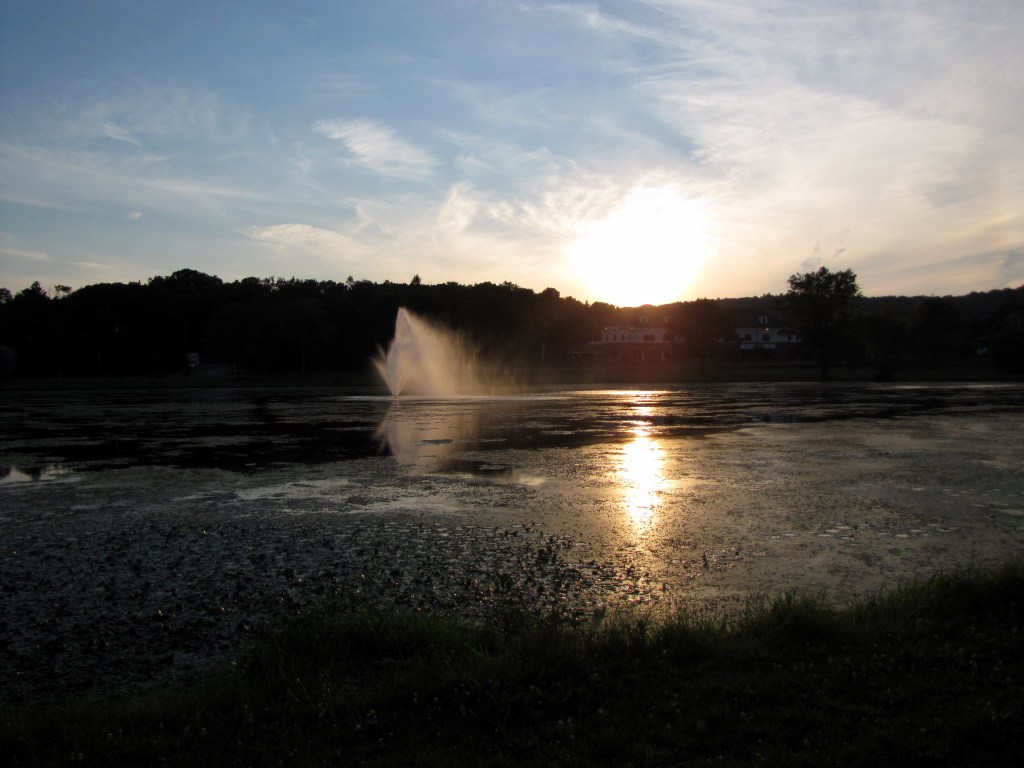
Millpond at Sunset

According to the United States Census Bureau, the village has a total area of 3.5 square miles (9.0 km^{2}), of which 3.4 square miles (8.9 km^{2}) is land and 0.1 square mile (0.1 km^{2}) (1.44%) is water.

== Demographics ==
Historical population
Census	Pop.	Note	%±
1880	459		—
1890	630		37.3%
1900	796		26.3%
1910	1,195		50.1%
1920	1,527		27.8%
1930	1,621		6.2%
1940	1,616		−0.3%
1950	1,753		8.5%
1960	3,323		89.6%
1970	4,439		33.6%
1980	5,996		35.1%
1990	6,672		11.3%
2000	7,780		16.6%
2010	8,364		7.5%
2020	9,343		11.7%
U.S. Decennial Census

As of the census of 2000, there were 7,780 people, 2,569 households, and 2,101 families residing in the village. The population density was 2,269.7 inhabitants per square mile (876.3/km^{2}). There were 2,620 housing units at an average density of 764.3 per square mile (295.1/km^{2}). The racial makeup of the village was 91.03% White, 2.57% Black or African American, 0.40% Native American, 2.34% Asian, 0.01% Pacific Islander, 2.28% from other races, and 1.38% from two or more races. Hispanic or Latino of any race were 8.73% of the population. 22.9% were of Irish, 22.4% Italian, 6.3% Polish and 6.3% German ancestry according to Census 2000. 86.9% spoke English, 7.1% Spanish, 2.4% Ukrainian and 1.2% Italian as their first language.

There were 2,569 households, out of which 44.6% had children under the age of 18 living with them, 69.8% were married couples living together, 8.0% had a female householder with no husband present, and 18.2% were non-families. 14.6% of all households were made up of individuals, and 5.7% had someone living alone who was 65 years of age or older. The average household size was 3.01 and the average family size was 3.35.

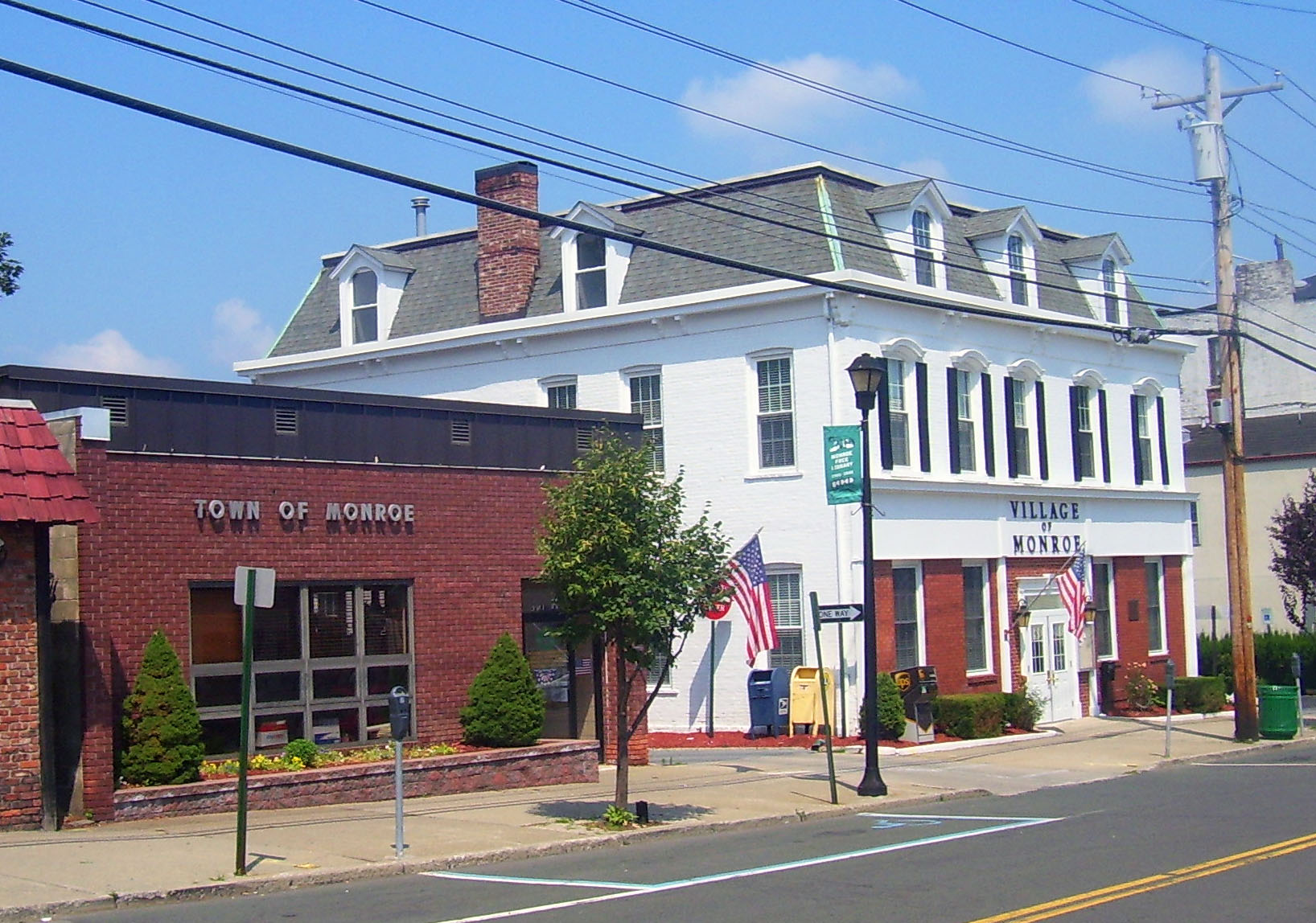
Monroe's village hall, to right of Monroe town hall

In the village, the population was spread out, with 29.4% under the age of 18, 6.4% from 18 to 24, 31.0% from 25 to 44, 23.9% from 45 to 64, and 9.4% who were 65 years of age or older. The median age was 36 years. For every 100 females, there were 98.8 males. For every 100 females age 18 and over, there were 94.7 males.

The median income for a household in the village was $70,809, and the median income for a family was $76,894. Males had a median income of $63,033 versus $33,184 for females. The per capita income for the village was $25,614. About 4.6% of families and 4.8% of the population were below the poverty line, including 3.5% of those under age 18 and 5.1% of those age 65 or over.

== Other village in the Town of Monroe ==
- Harriman
