= Wilford Wood House =

Historic house in New York, United States

- U.S. National Register of Historic Places
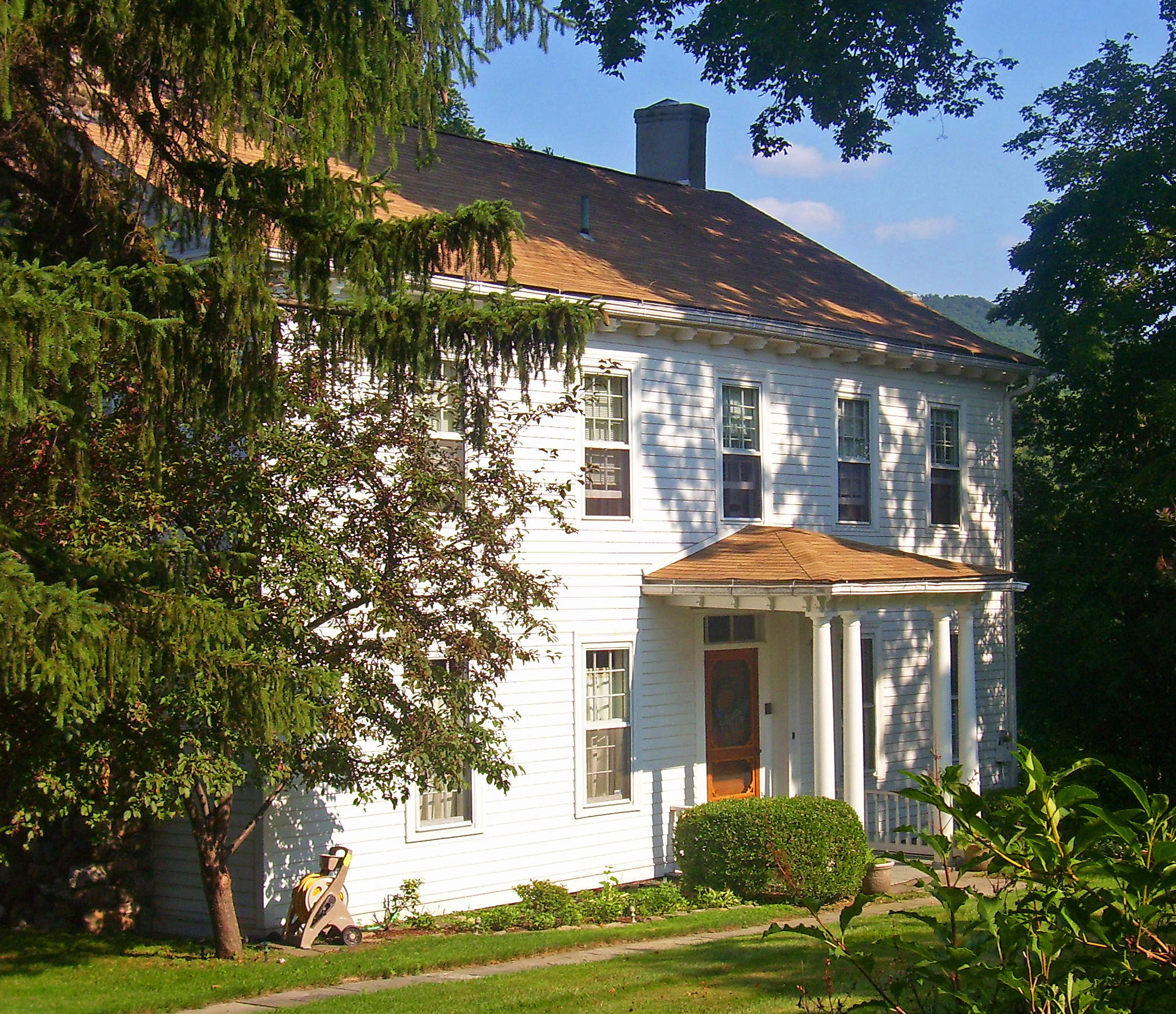
- West (front) elevation in 2007

- Location within New York Location within the United States
- Location: Mountainville, NY
- Nearest city: Newburgh
- Coordinates: 41°24′43″N 74°04′25″W
- Area: 2 acres (0.81 ha)
- Built: ca. 1890
- Architectural style: Colonial Revival
- MPS: Historic and Architectural Resources of Cornwall
- NRHP reference No.: 98001118
- Added to NRHP: 1998

The Wilford Wood House is located on Pleasant Hill Road just east of the New York State Thruway in the Mountainville section of Cornwall, New York, United States. It is a white Colonial Revival farmhouse built in the late 19th century, a period when most large new houses in Cornwall were being built as boardinghouses to serve those who came to the area as a summer resort. The Wood house, too, would be used as a boardinghouse where guests could take in the mountain air and views of the surrounding mountains.

It was added to the National Register of Historic Places in 1998. Signs around the property indicate that it is currently owned by nearby Storm King Art Center. It is sided in white clapboard, with a gabled roof shingled in asphalt and pierced by two chimneys, one stone and the other brick. The cornice is bracketed. A porch with two classical columns runs the length of the western (front) facade.

== Building ==
The two-and-a-half-story house sits in the middle of its 2-acre (0.81 ha) lot, with views of Schunemunk Mountain to the south and the Hudson Highlands to the east. Immediately to the west is the New York State Thruway.

It is sided in white clapboard with a gabled roof covered in asphalt shingles, pierced by two chimneys, one stone and the other brick. The roofline is marked by a bracketed cornice. A small porch on the western (front) facade is supported by two classically styled columns.

The Dutch door at the entrance leads into a central hall, ending in a rear Dutch door. Oak flooring is original, but the lath and plaster walls on the first story have been covered over with drywall. An original staircase leads to the second story, where the plaster walls remain uncovered. More original furnishings, including fixtures for gas lamps, are up the disappearing staircase in the attic. Many of the doors in the house and their hardware are original.

A three-car-garage and breezeway are connected to the house. Built later, they are architecturally sympathetic.

== History ==
The house was built around 1890 as the center of the much larger Wood farm. At that time most larger houses in Cornwall were built to serve as boardinghouses (or, as with the Walter Hand House, both farmhouses and boardinghouses). It is a rare example of a late-19th-century farmhouse in the town, albeit later used as a boardinghouse as well due to the mountain scenery.

Only two substantial exterior renovations have been undertaken. The stone chimney was added to the south end around 1930, and in 1996 the garage and breezeway were added. The interior walls on the first story were also covered in drywall at some point in the late 20th century.
