= Oliver Brewster House =

Historic house in New York, United States

- U.S. National Register of Historic Places
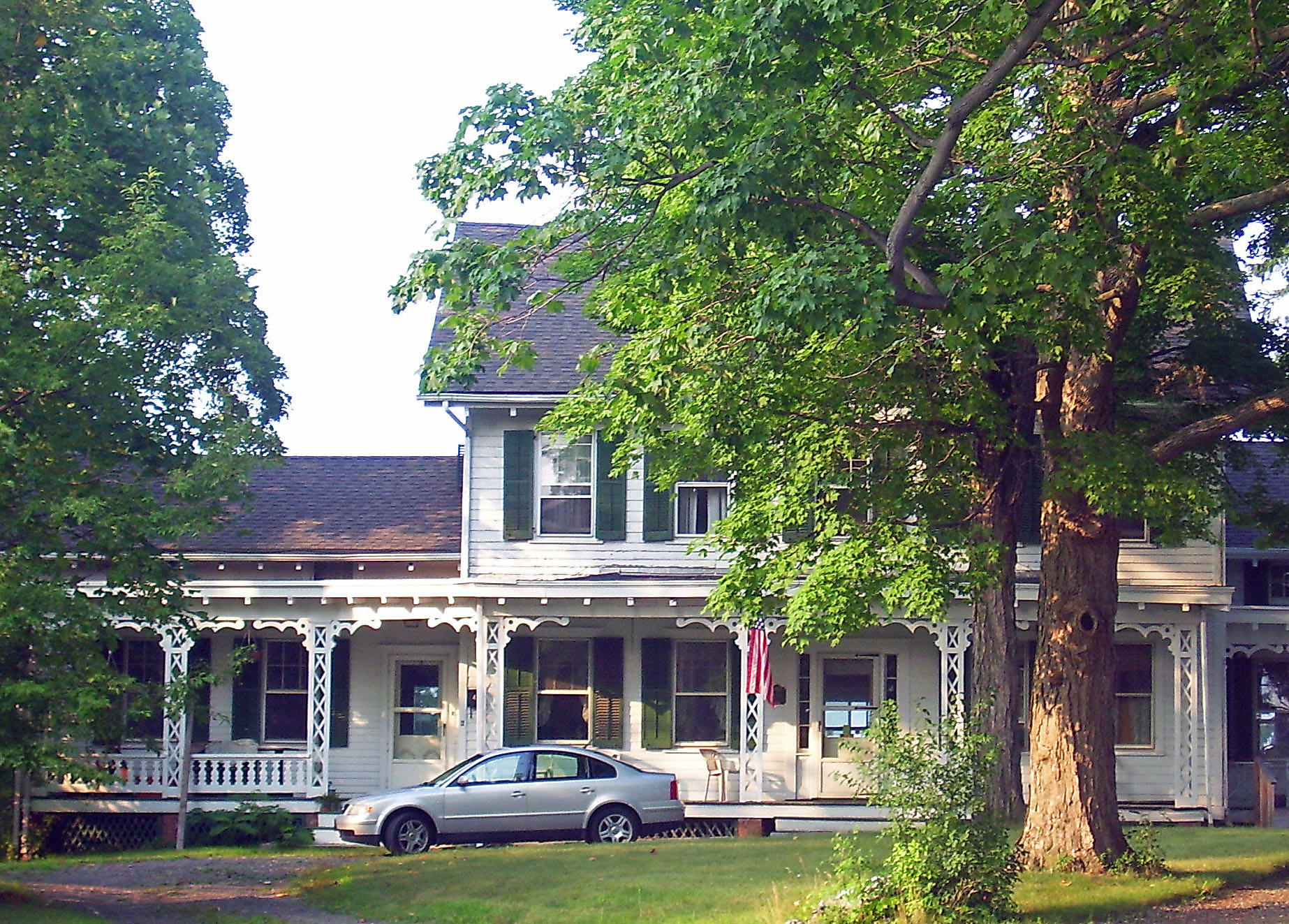
- Main block and southeast wing in 2007

- Location within New York Location within the United States
- Interactive map showing the location for Brewster House
- Location: 66 Willow Ave., Cornwall, New York (state)
- Nearest city: Newburgh
- Coordinates: 41°26′20″N 74°02′14″W
- Area: 4 acres (1.6 ha)
- Built: c. 1850
- Architectural style: Gothic Revival
- MPS: Historic and Architectural Resources of Cornwall
- NRHP reference No.: 96000149
- Added to NRHP: March 8, 1996

The Oliver Brewster House is a Gothic Revival home located on Willow Avenue in Cornwall, New York, United States, right across from Willow Avenue Elementary School. It was originally built as a farmhouse in the mid-19th century. Later, as Cornwall became a popular summer resort for visitors from New York City, it was expanded and renovated for use as a boardinghouse as well.

== Property ==
The house sits on a four-acre "flag lot", with trees and shrubs, so called for its deeper setback from neighboring houses on the street and narrower access between them. There are seven buildings and structures on the property, six of which are considered contributing resources to the National Register listing.

The main building is two stories high, five bays wide and sided in narrow clapboard. It has two-one-story wings, three bays on the northwest and two on the southeast. The gable-fronted roof, pierced by a brick chimney on the northwest, has overhanging eaves with exposed rafters. A molded cornice also marks all the house's rooflines. The exposed basement is made of stone.

A flat-roofed raised wooden porch with bracketed cornice supported by elaborate lattice-style columns runs the length of the first story on the front (southwest) facade, across the main block and both wings. A similar porch on the northeast (rear) has been enclosed with glass.

The centrally located main entrance is a paneled wood door in a recessed entryway with a wooden surround and sidelights. It leads into a main hallway with large flanking rooms and many original furnishings. These include the flooring, ceiling molding, marble fireplaces and mantels, pocket doors between the parlors and the original staircase with newel post and balustrade.

Southeast of the house is the first of the contributing properties: a bracketed, hip-roofed wellhouse. Behind it is a two-story carriage barn with gabled roof and board-and-batten siding. There is also a small gable-roofed privy behind it.

The main barn has a jerkin roof on the end gable. Three of its four bays have had modern garage doors installed; the other one has a wooden paneled double door with loft door above. A nearby shed is vertically sided with a gable roof. The property also has a modern frame garage, its only noncontributing resource.

== History ==
Brewster built the house, then the main block and southeast wing, around 1850 on property owned at the time by the De Crissey family, which he had recently married into. He and his wife began growing fruit, primarily strawberries, raspberries and other small berries on the farm. They were the first in the Hudson Valley to cultivate the Niagara grape.

Not long afterwards, the summer boarding industry began to become a major part of Cornwall's economy. Like other local farmers, such as Wilford Wood and Samuel Brooks, he expanded his home to take in summer boarders. Around 1860 he added the northwest wing for this purpose.

It has remained a private house ever since.

It has survived mostly intact from that era, unlike most other converted farmhouses in the area. Several farm-related outbuildings on the property are also intact. It was added to the National Register of Historic Places on March 8, 1996.
