= Hand House =

Hand House may refer to:

- Hand House (Shubuta, Mississippi), listed on the NRHP in Mississippi
- Walter Hand House, Cornwall, NY, listed on the NRHP in New York
- Ross-Hand Mansion, South Nyack, NY, listed on the NRHP in New York
- Elias Hand House, Mountainville, NY, listed on the NRHP in New York
- Hand House, Elizabethtown, New York, listed on the NRHP in New York
- Gen. Edward Hand House, Lancaster, PA, listed on the NRHP in Pennsylvania
