= Beaver Lake, New York =

Beaver Lake, New York may refer to:

- Beaverdam Lake–Salisbury Mills, New York, a former census-designated place (CDP) in the corner of the towns of Blooming Grove, Cornwall, and New Windsor
- Beaver Dam Lake, New York, a census-designated place (CDP) that surrounds Beaverdam Lake in eastern Orange County
