= Firthcliffe Firehouse =

- U.S. National Register of Historic Places
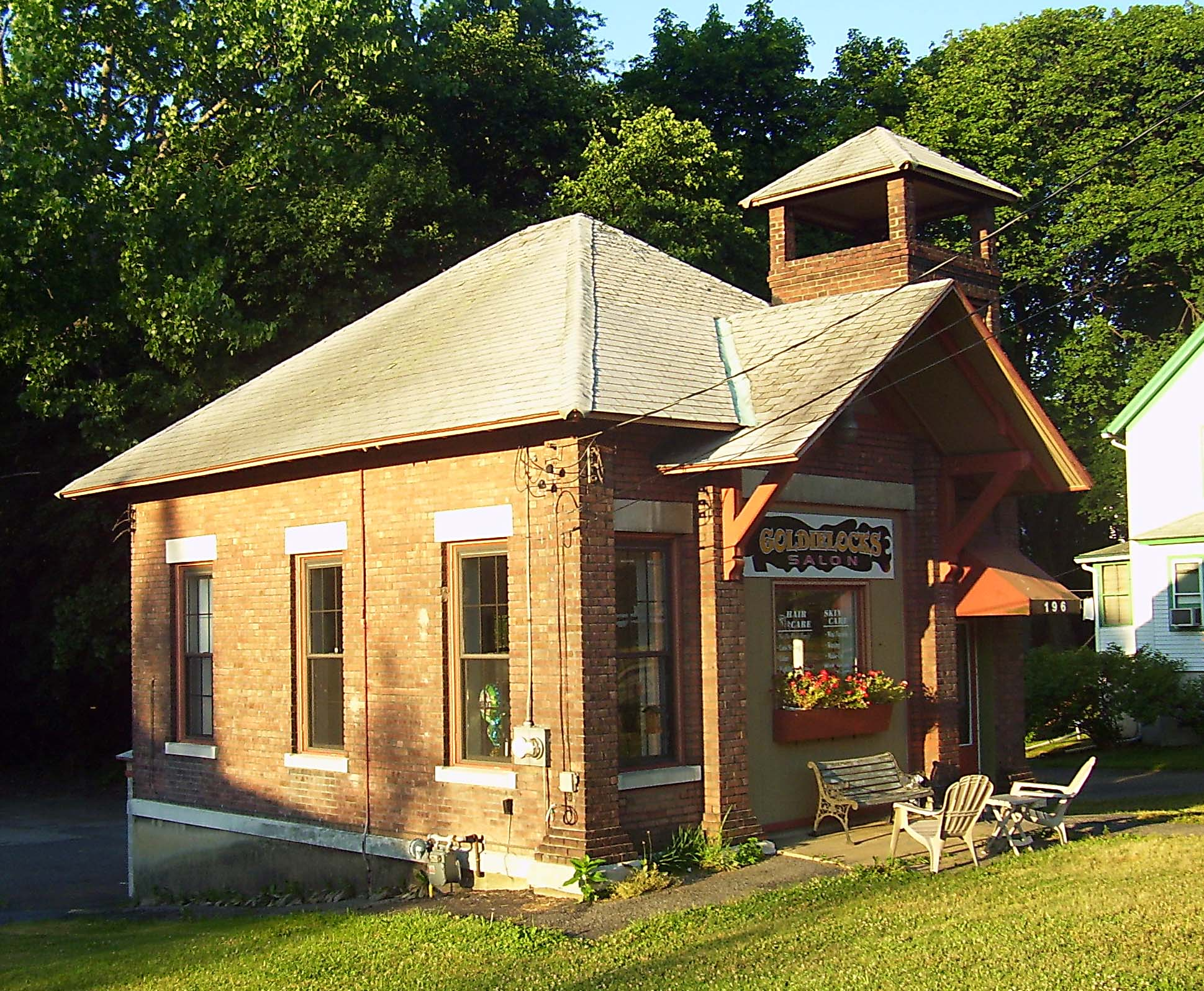
- The former firehouse, now a hair salon, in 2007

- Location within New York Location within the United States
- Location: 196 Willow Ave. Cornwall, NY
- Nearest city: Newburgh
- Coordinates: 41°26′33″N 74°02′37″W
- Built: ca. 1900
- MPS: Historic and Architectural Resources of Cornwall
- NRHP reference No.: 96000554
- Added to NRHP: June 3, 1996

The Firthcliffe Firehouse is located along Willow Avenue in the Town of Cornwall in Orange County, New York, United States. It was built to protect the homes being built by the Firth Carpet Company for workers at its nearby plant in the early 20th century.

In 1996 it was added to the National Register of Historic Places. It is currently being used as a hair salon.

== Building ==
The firehouse is located on a small lot on the north side of the street. The ground slopes down gently from the road. The neighborhood is residential except for the firehouse, with houses across the street and on either side.

It is a one-story three-bay square brick building with hipped roof shingled in slate. A stone watercourse separates the first story from the basement, and all windows and doors have stone lintels and sills. A square bell tower with hipped roof supported by four brick pillars, rises from the east side of the building near the main entrance.

On the front facade, the two eastern bays are the former entrance for the fire wagon, now occupied by a window and door. A projecting wooden gable, with a slight bell flare at the eaves and exposed rafters, shelters the entrance. The basement entrance, on the exposed south side due to the slope of the land, is also covered by a similar wooden gable.

Several frame partitions have been put up inside to create interior rooms in what was originally undivided space. The fireman's pole is still in place. A simple wooden stair leads to the basement and the bell tower.

== History ==
Charles Firthcliffe built his textile mill on Moodna Creek near the end of the 19th century. He built a house near the mill, and also built for his workers, who began settling in what became the hamlet of Firthcliffe by 1900.

The firehouse was probably built around that time to protect those properties. Its small size suggests it could only house one engine and was therefore meant to protect only a small area. It style was typical for public buildings of that time.

Most of the houses built for Firthcliffe and his employees remain, but have been extensively altered. The firehouse is the only intact building from that era in the hamlet.

== See also ==
- National Register of Historic Places listings in Orange County, New York
