= Samuel Brooks House (Cornwall, New York) =

Historic house in New York, United States

- U.S. National Register of Historic Places
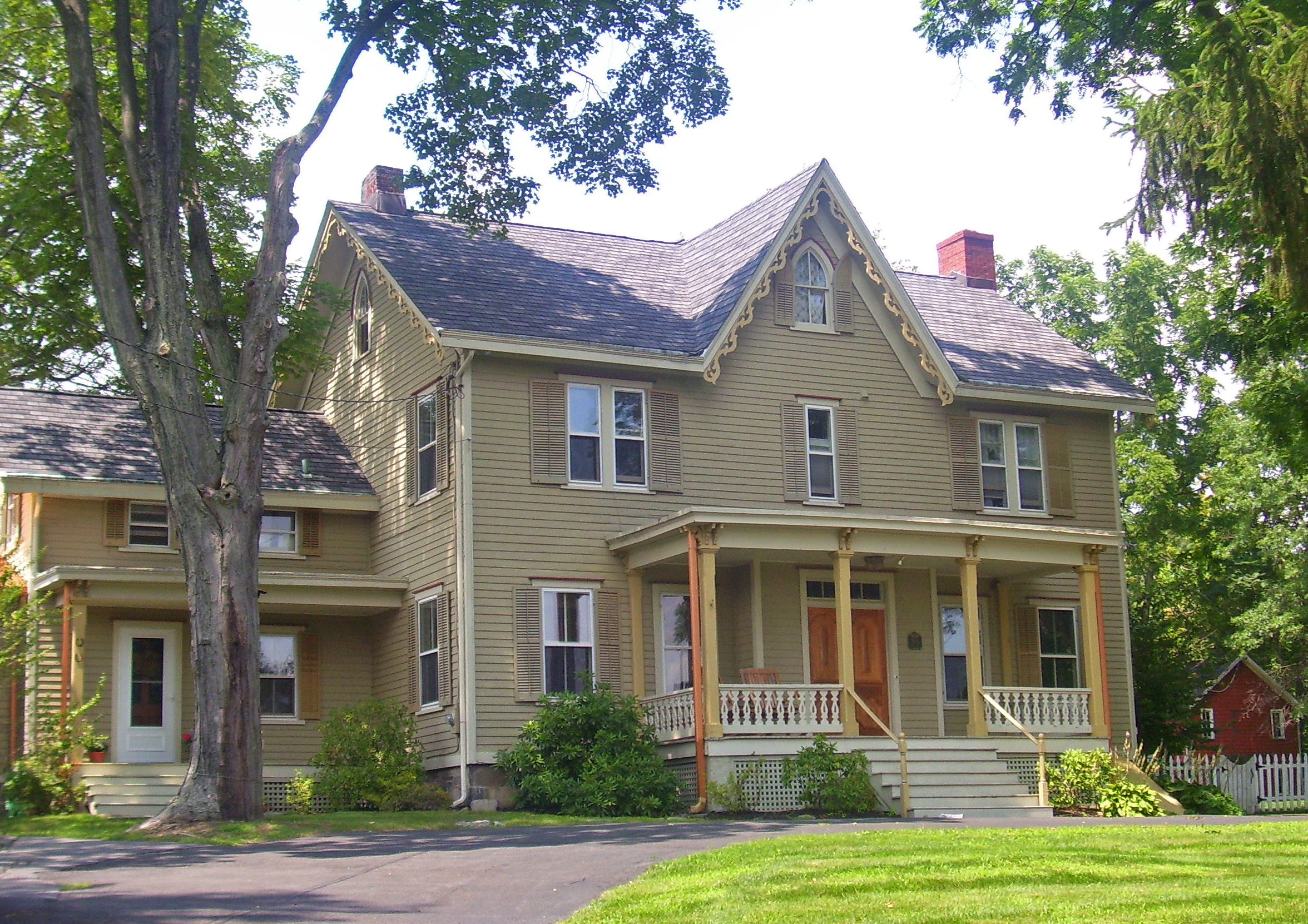
- Front (east) elevation, 2008

- Location within New York Location within the United States
- Interactive map showing the location of Brooks House
- Location: Mountainville, New York
- Nearest city: Newburgh
- Coordinates: 41°25′17″N 74°04′29″W
- Area: 1.3 acres (5,300 m^{2})
- Built: ca. 1860
- Architectural style: Carpenter Gothic, Stick
- MPS: Historic and Architectural Resources of Cornwall
- NRHP reference No.: 96000148
- Added to NRHP: March 8, 1996

The Samuel Brooks House is located on Pleasant Hill Road north of the hamlet of Mountainville in the Town of Cornwall, New York, United States. It is a cottage in a mix of Victorian architectural styles, most notably Carpenter Gothic and Stick Style, built around 1860.

Its location, near Schunemunk Mountain, and architecture made it a desirable location for the summer boarders who made Cornwall a popular resort community in the late 19th century. It survives mostly intact today. In 1996 it was listed on the National Register of Historic Places (NRHP).

== Property ==
The house sits back from Pleasant Hill Road at the end of a semicircular driveway. There are two barns near it, both part of Brooks' original farm, long since subdivided. Both are considered contributing resources to the NRHP listing.

Two and a half stories high with a setback southern wing one story shorter, the five-bay house is sided in clapboard. Its cross-gabled roof, shingled in asphalt, is trimmed with a plain molded cornice with plain frieze and ornate carved vergeboards in the gables, framing a pointed-arch window with hood molding on the more-visible southern and eastern faces. A brick chimney rises from the north end.

A small wooden front entrance porch has a flat roof, bracketed cornice, piers with similar capitals and a cutout railing in between, and a plain frieze. The wing and west (rear) face have similar porches without the cutouts.

The paneled wooden door leads to a central hall. Many of the finishings and trim in the 3,066 square feet (284.8 m^{2}) of interior space on both stories is original.

Behind the house is a two-story vertical-sided wooden barn with a cross-gabled roof shingled in wood. The other barn, to the northwest, is sided in wood shingles with a gabled asphalt roof. Both are remnants of the original farm.

== History ==
Brooks, a descendant of one of Cornwall's oldest families, built this as a farmhouse around 1860. After the Civil War, summer boarders from New York City began coming to Cornwall, and Brooks quickly adapted it for use as a boardinghouse.

The house has remained a residence ever since. Since September 2008, it has been for sale.
