= Canterbury Presbyterian Church =

Historic church in New York, United States

- U.S. National Register of Historic Places
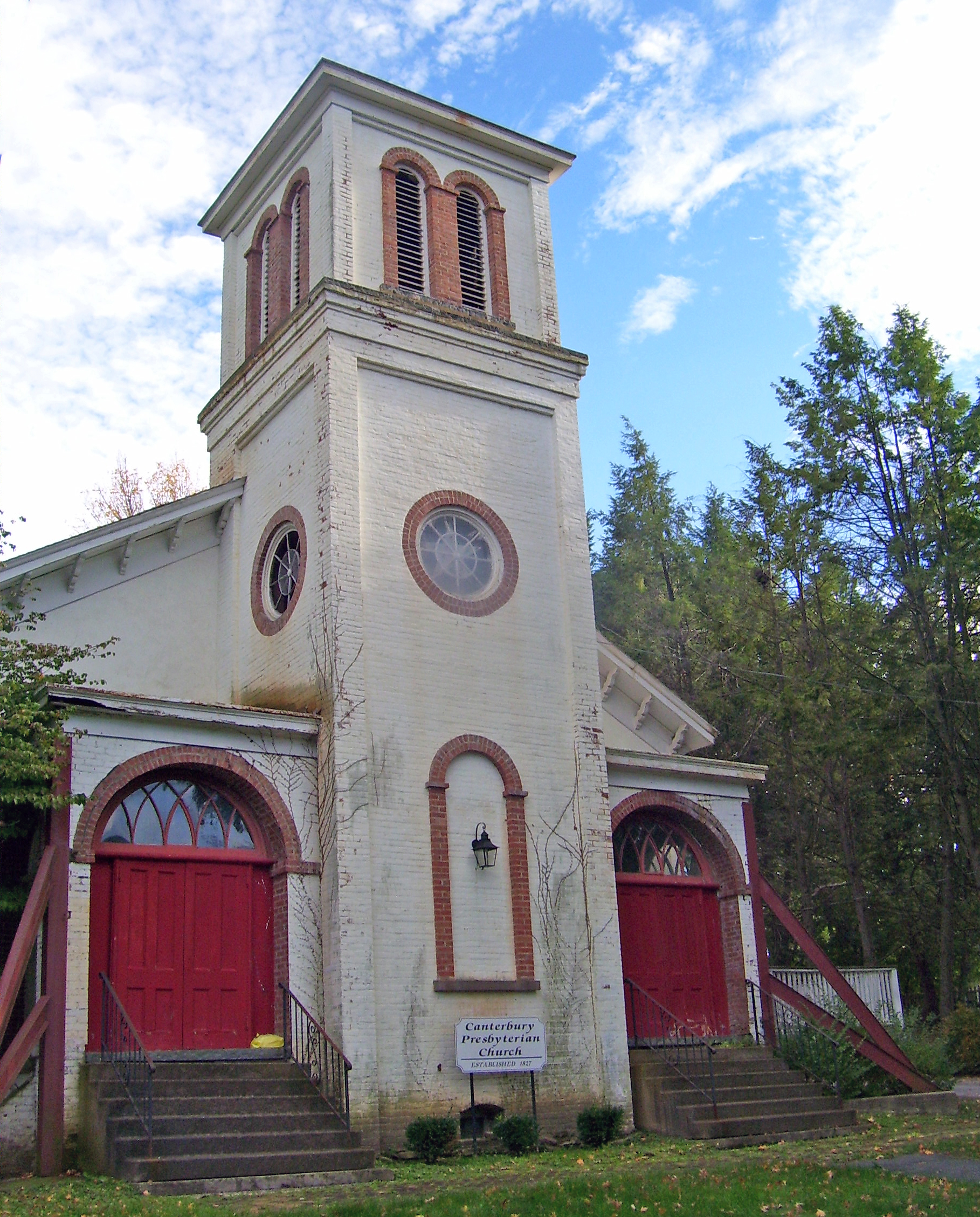
- Church in 2007
- Location: Cornwall, NY
- Nearest city: Newburgh
- Coordinates: 41°26′07″N 74°01′53″W
- Built: 1826
- Architectural style: Federal style
- MPS: Town of Cornwall Historic and Architectural Resources
- NRHP reference No.: 96000556
- Added to NRHP: 1996

Canterbury Presbyterian Church is located along Clinton Street in downtown Cornwall, New York, United States. It is a white stone and brick building in the Federal style, with later additions in a Colonial Revival style consistent with the earlier structure. Since 1996 it has been listed on the National Register of Historic Places.

Services were last held in 2004 as the church merged into Cornwall Presbyterian Church, which had been founded by dissident members of Canterbury. The building has been used by several local nonprofit groups. In 2018 the Church which had been in need of structural repairs was acquired and converted in to a Dance Studio.

== Church and grounds ==
The church follows a three-by-four-bay layout with distinctive Federal touches as symmetrical fenestration, fanlights and rectangular gable massing. It is one and a half storeys in height with the dominant bell tower, added later, reaching two stories. Two major additions have been built, both much later but consistent with the original style.

Much of the interior of the church is original. The floor plan has not been significantly altered, and the pews, furnishings, wainscoting and wall finishings are original.

A contributing resource to the listing is the original churchyard to the rear of the property. Fifty gravestones of past congregants have been identified, the earliest dating to the 1830s.

== History ==
The first Presbyterian congregation in the Cornwall area first met in 1824 under both the Canterbury name and the First Presbyterian Society in the village of Cornwall. The church was built two years later and then, in 1827, the 17 charter members, referring to themselves in their minutes as a "small and feeble band", formally organized as the First Presbyterian Church in Canterbury.

By 1829 the new church had more than tripled in size. In 1856 part of the congregation broke away to form the Cornwall Presbyterian Church when they disagreed with the prevailing abolitionist sentiment, and the strictness of Jonathan Silliman, the church's longtime pastor. Nine years later, in 1865, the remaining members raised funds to build the bell tower and new entrance vestibules. Further renovations came in 1891, when local contractor H. R. Taylor was hired to build a new chapel, named after The Rev. Jonathan Silliman, pastor from 1835–61. Electric lights were installed in the church sanctuary at that time.

Cornwall Presbyterian Church reunited with Canterbury in 1925, only to break away again in 1957 over other issues. Canterbury responded by adding onto the building again, with Hagen Hall, an addition to Silliman Chapel, in 1961. Its low gabled roof was modeled after the carriage shed it had replaced.

In the later years of the 20th century the church grew smaller and smaller, and began taking in tenants like the Arts Alliance, which brought films and dances to the building on weekends. These were well-attended, but ultimately it was not enough to save the church, and by 2003 it was down to 11 members. The walls were shaky enough to require temporary shoring up by steel struts.

On February 15, 2004, the last services were held, ending 178 years of church history. Members merged with Cornwall, which had become the dominant Presbyterian church in the town. Since then the Arts Alliance and other nonprofits have continued their activities in the church. It has been sold to a couple who plan to reopen it as the Canterbury Center, a combination spiritual awareness and healing arts center, while continuing to make it available for community groups. Some of the artifacts from the church have been preserved and will be exhibited at the Cornwall Historical Society's museum at Town Hall.
