= Walter Hand House =

Historic house in New York, United States

- U.S. National Register of Historic Places
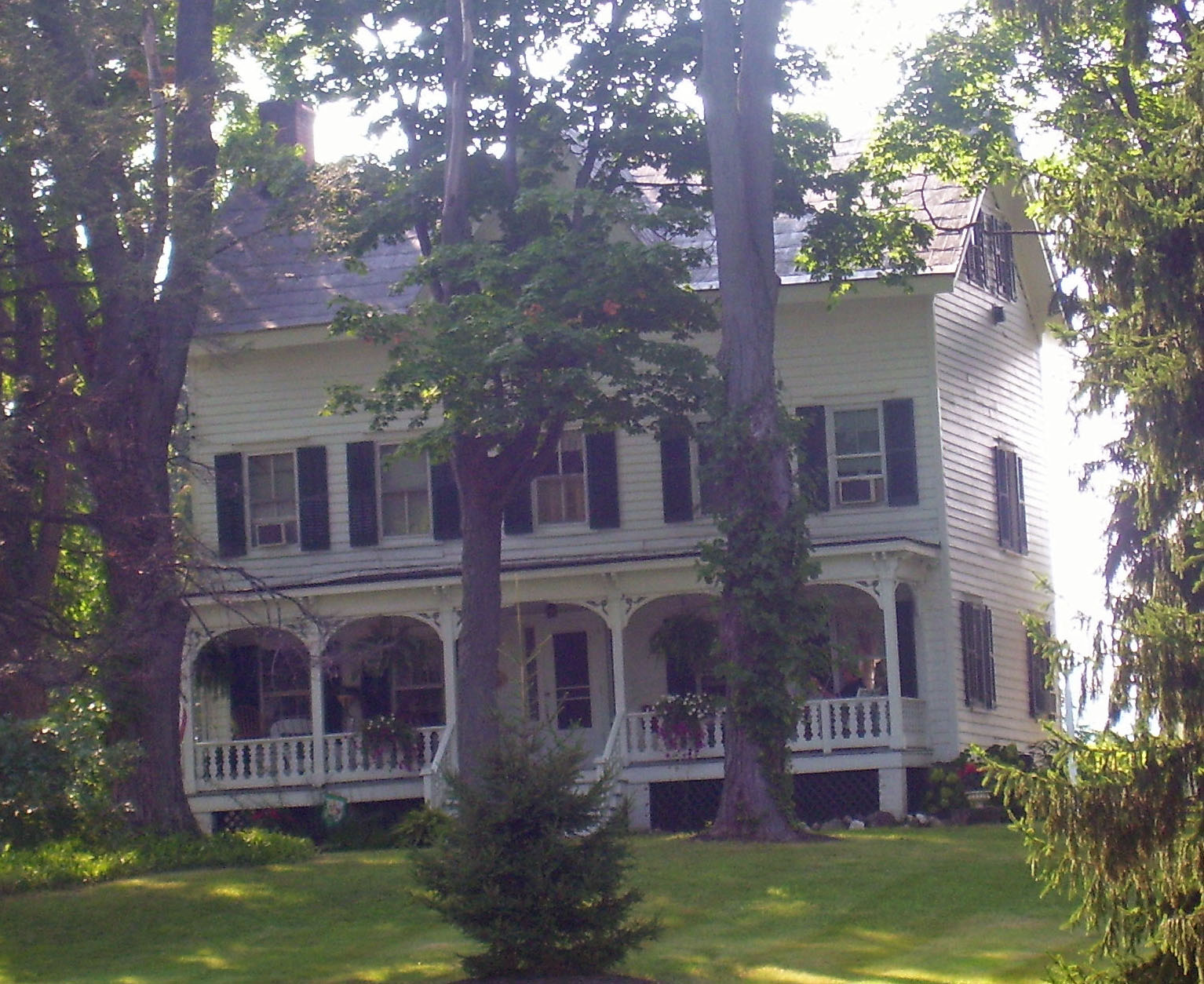
- Front (east) elevation, 2008

- Location within New York
- Interactive map of Walter Hand House
- Location: Cornwall, NY
- Nearest city: Newburgh
- Coordinates: 41°24′20″N 74°03′49″W
- Area: 5 acres (2 ha)
- Built: ca. 1870
- Architectural style: Gothic Revival
- MPS: Historic and Architectural Resources of Cornwall
- NRHP reference No.: 96000154
- Added to NRHP: 1996

The Walter Hand House is located on Angola Road in Cornwall, New York, United States. It is the main building of a five-acre (2 ha) former farm, built around 1870, to serve as both a farmhouse and summer boardinghouse, in response to Cornwall's growing popularity as a summer resort town.

Today it is known as Shadow Mountain Farm, a bed and breakfast . Both properties were listed on the National Register of Historic Places (NRHP) in 1996.

== Property ==
The house sits on a gentle rise with a view to the west highlighting Schunemunk Mountain. The lot is the remainder of a much larger farm that has been subdivided since the house was built. There are six other buildings besides the house, all considered contributing resources to the NRHP listing.

It is a five-bay two-and-a-half-story clapboard-sided structure with Gothic detailing and a molded cornice and plain frieze at the roofline. The wooden-shingled roof, pierced by brick chimneys at either end, is cross-gabled by a two-story rear wing projecting from the south side, itself with a one-story pent-roofed bay on its own west.

A one-story porch fronts the entire east elevation, with a flat roof, bracketed cornice, piers with decorated capitals and a plain frieze similar to the roofline. Elaborate cutouts form the guardrail between piers.

Inside, the house follows a center hall plan. Many of the original finishings, hardware and trim remain. The attic, used as lodging for summer boarders, is completely finished as well.

The six other buildings, all contemporary with the house's original construction, are located slightly downhill and to the rear. There are a small complex of two two-story wooden barns, a kitchen building since converted into a home, a carriage house with its original doors and hardware, and a shed.

== History ==
The house was built some time around 1870 by Hand, descended from one of Cornwall's oldest families. A successful apple farmer, he saw the growing interest of New York City residents in spending their summers amid the fresh air of Cornwall, and had the house's attic finished to take some in during that season. It was effectively built to be both a farmhouse and a summer boardinghouse.

It has passed through a variety of owners since then. Recently it has returned to its original use as lodging, with the owners of Cromwell Manor operating it as Shadow Mountain Farm Cottage, a bed and breakfast.
