= Elias Hand House =

Historic house in New York, United States

- U.S. National Register of Historic Places
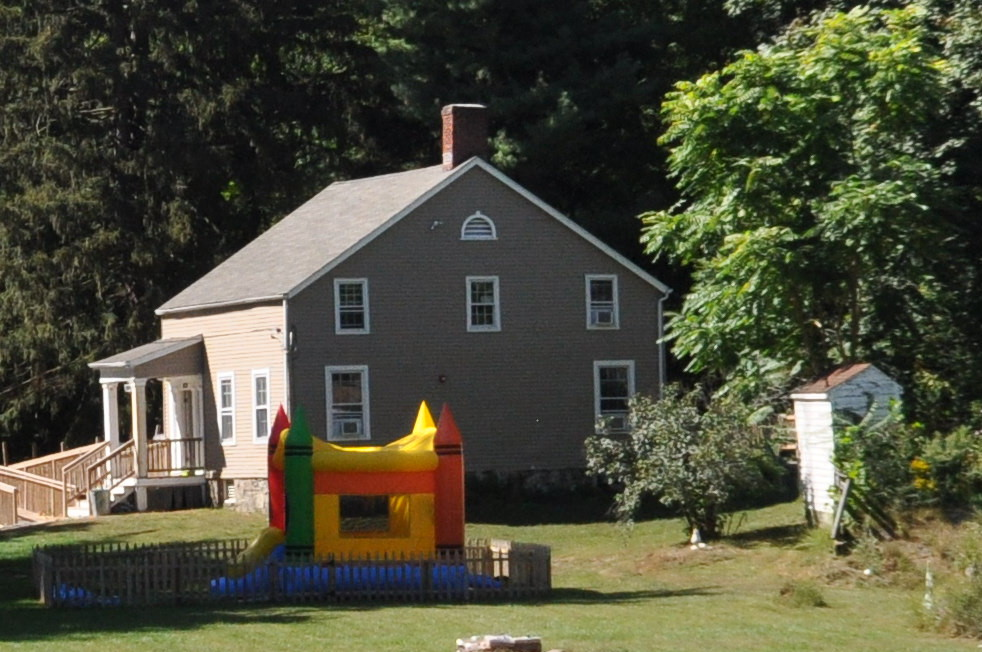

- Location within New York Location within the United States
- Location: NY 32, Mountainville, New York
- Coordinates: 41°24′1″N 74°4′51″W
- Area: 1.9 acres (0.77 ha)
- Built: 1830
- Architectural style: Greek Revival
- MPS: Cornwall MPS
- NRHP reference No.: 98001119
- Added to NRHP: August 28, 1998

The Elias Hand House is a historic home located at Mountainville in Orange County, New York. It was built about 1830 and is a 1 1/2-story, clapboard-sided wood-frame dwelling in the Greek Revival style. It has a side-hall plan and a low-pitched gable roof. It features a portico with a pent roof supported by two square Doric order columns. Also on the property is a contributing wood-frame barn.

It was listed on the National Register of Historic Places in 1998.
