= Beaverdam Lake–Salisbury Mills, New York =

Beaverdam Lake-Salisbury Mills
- Former census-designated place
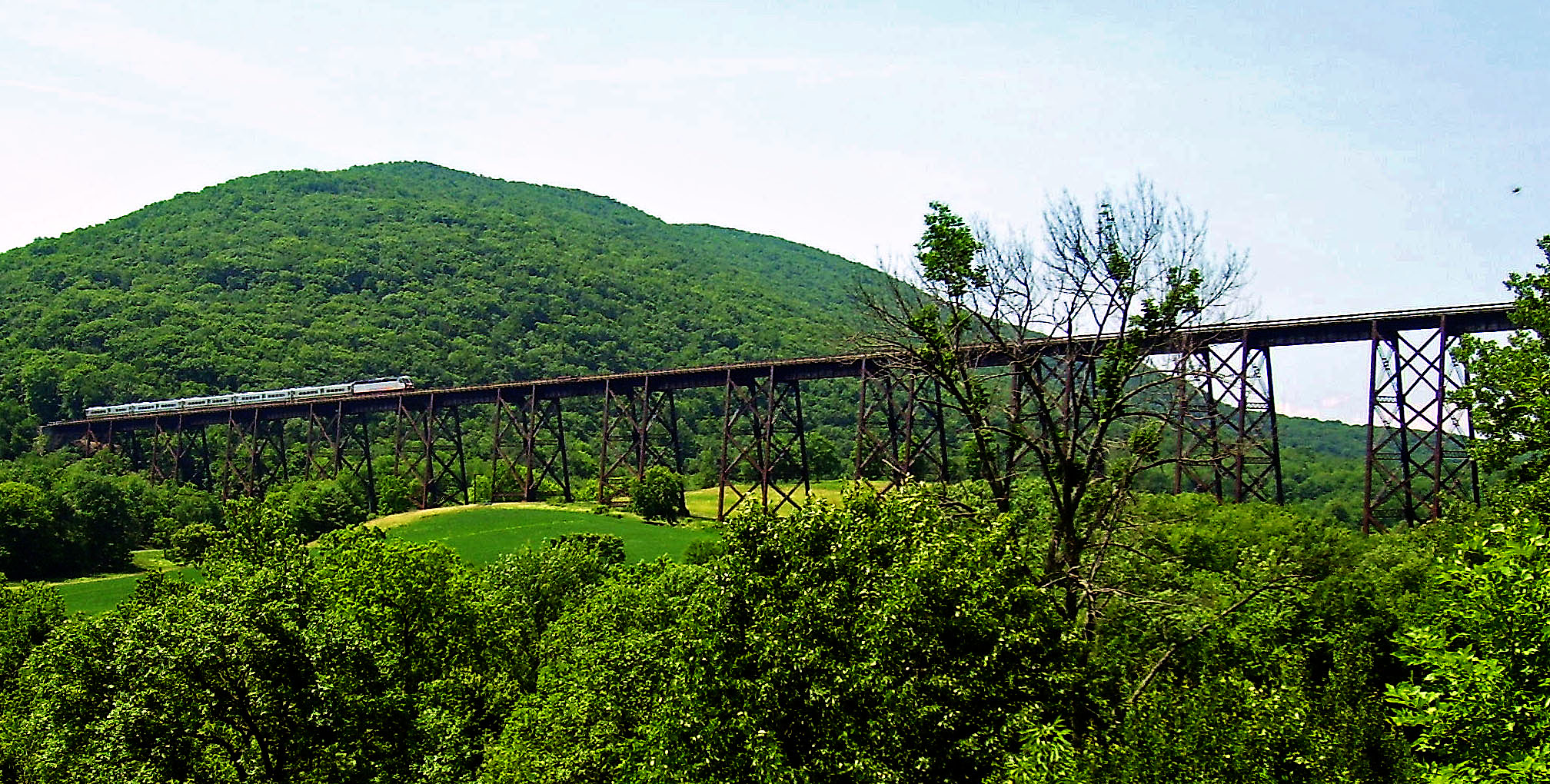
- The Moodna Viaduct, a major local landmark

- Location of Beaverdam Lake in Orange County and the state of New York.
- Coordinates: 41°25′50″N 74°07′09″W
- Country: United States
- State: New York
- Region: Hudson Valley
- County: Orange

Area
  - Total: 2.6 sq mi (6.7 km^{2})
  - Land: 2.4 sq mi (6.2 km^{2})
  - Water: 0.3 sq mi (0.78 km^{2})
- Elevation: 300 ft (91 m)

Population (2000)
  - Total: 2,779
  - Density: 1,200/sq mi (450/km^{2})
- Time zone: UTC-5 (Eastern (EST))
  - Summer (DST): UTC-4 (EDT)
- ZIP Code: 12577
- Area code: 845

Beaverdam Lake-Salisbury Mills was a census-designated place (CDP) in Orange County, New York, United States. It encompassed a region in the corner of the towns of Blooming Grove, Cornwall, and New Windsor. As of the 2000 census, its population was 2,779. After the 2000 census, the area was counted as two separate CDPs: Beaver Dam Lake in the towns of Blooming Grove and New Windsor and Salisbury Mills in the towns of Blooming Grove and Cornwall. Beaverdam Lake is also the name of a lake next to the community.

The area is part of the Poughkeepsie–Newburgh–Middletown, NY Metropolitan Statistical Area as well as the larger New York–Newark–Bridgeport, NY-NJ-CT-PA Combined Statistical Area.

== Geography ==
Beaverdam Lake-Salisbury Mills was located at 41°26′11″N 74°6′41″W (41.436438, -74.111310).

According to the United States Census Bureau, the CDP had a total area of 2.6 square miles (6.7 km^{2}), of which 2.4 square miles (6.2 km^{2}) was land and 0.3 square miles (0.8 km^{2}) (9.92%) was water.

== Demographics ==
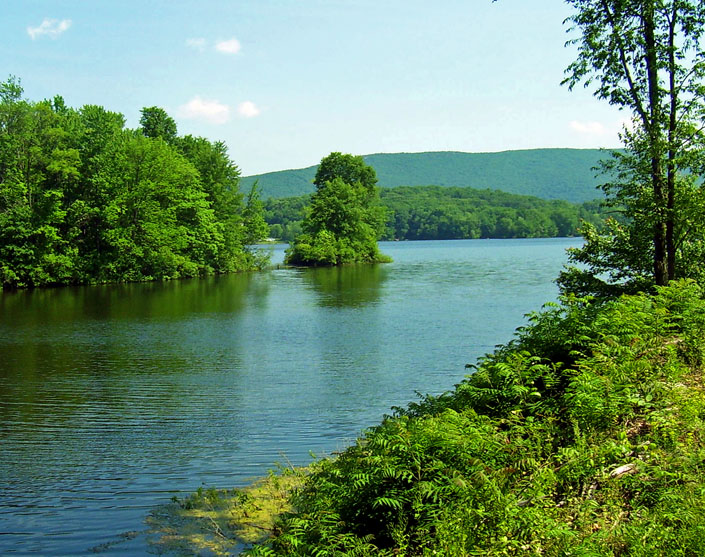
Beaverdam Lake

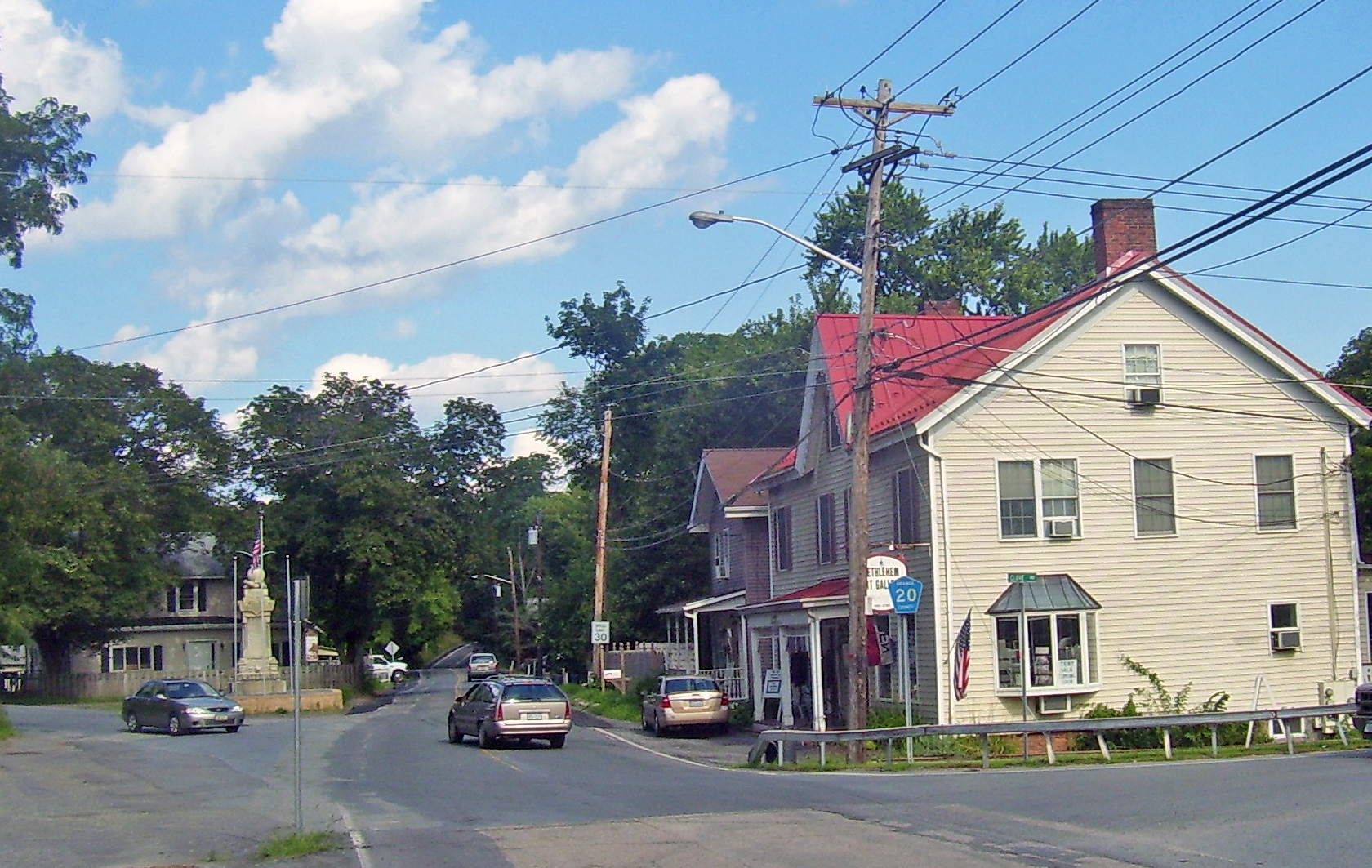
Downtown Salisbury Mills

As of the census of 2000, there were 2,779 people, 910 households, and 735 families residing in the CDP. The population density was 1,177.6 inhabitants per square mile (454.7/km^{2}). There were 957 housing units at an average density of 405.5 per square mile (156.6/km^{2}). The racial makeup of the CDP was 93.67% White, 2.30% African American, 0.29% Native American, 1.04% Asian, 0.04% Pacific Islander, 1.51% from other races, and 1.15% from two or more races. Hispanic or Latino of any race were 5.36% of the population.

There were 910 households, out of which 47.4% had children under the age of 18 living with them, 67.8% were married couples living together, 9.5% had a female householder with no husband present, and 19.2% were non-families. 15.3% of all households were made up of individuals, and 5.9% had someone living alone who was 65 years of age or older. The average household size was 3.03 and the average family size was 3.39.

In the CDP, the population was spread out, with 31.2% under the age of 18, 6.2% from 18 to 24, 32.5% from 25 to 44, 21.3% from 45 to 64, and 8.9% who were 65 years of age or older. The median age was 36 years. For every 100 females there were 98.1 males. For every 100 females age 18 and over, there were 95.2 males.

The median income for a household in the CDP was $63,250, and the median income for a family was $71,771. Males had a median income of $55,288 versus $36,603 for females. The per capita income for the CDP was $26,948. About 0.9% of families and 1.4% of the population were below the poverty line, including 1.7% of those under age 18 and none of those age 65 or over.
