= A. J. Clark Store =

- U.S. National Register of Historic Places
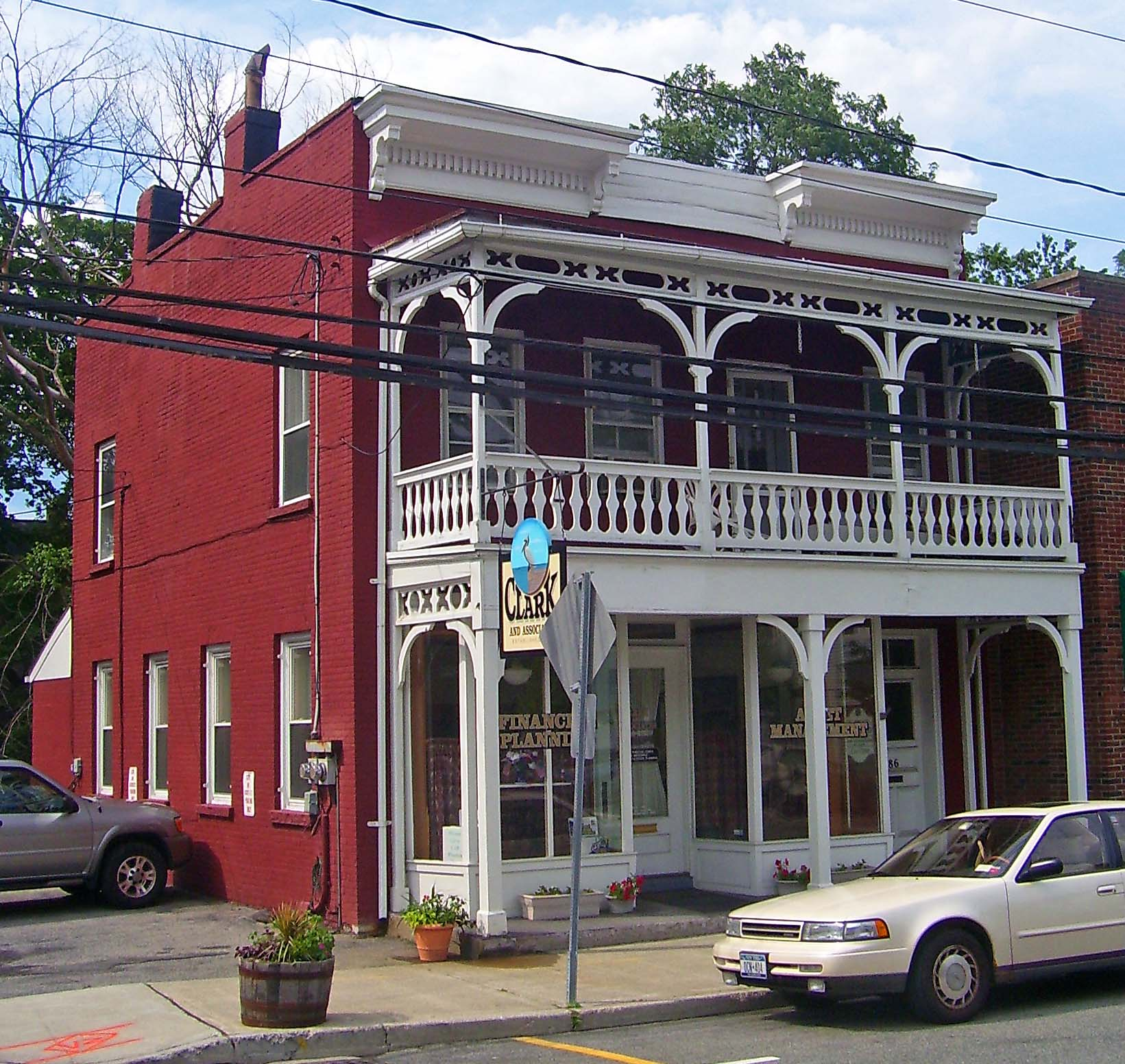
- Store in 2007

- Location within New York Location within the United States
- Location: 286 Main St. Cornwall, NY
- Nearest city: Newburgh
- Coordinates: 41°26′08″N 74°02′03″W
- Built: ca. 1875
- Architectural style: Italianate
- MPS: Cornwall MPS
- NRHP reference No.: 96001432
- Added to NRHP: December 6, 1996

The A. J. Clark Store is located along Main Street in downtown Cornwall, New York, United States. It is a brick Italianate building dating from approximately 1875.

It has a two-foot (60 cm) parapet around its entire roof and a covered two-story porch looking out on the street. Inside, original period features such as a pressed-metal ceiling, hardwood floors, doors and staircase remain. There have been no significant changes to the building since its original construction.

Archer Clark built the building to house his butcher shop around 1875, after an 1870 fire destroyed his earlier quarters. It would continue in existence in that building for a century. Later, one of his descendants converted it into a delicatessen, and today another Clark does financial planning on the ground floor. In 1996 it was added to the National Register of Historic Places as an intact commercial building dating from Cornwall's days as a summer resort town in the late 19th century.
