= Firthcliffe, New York =

- CDP
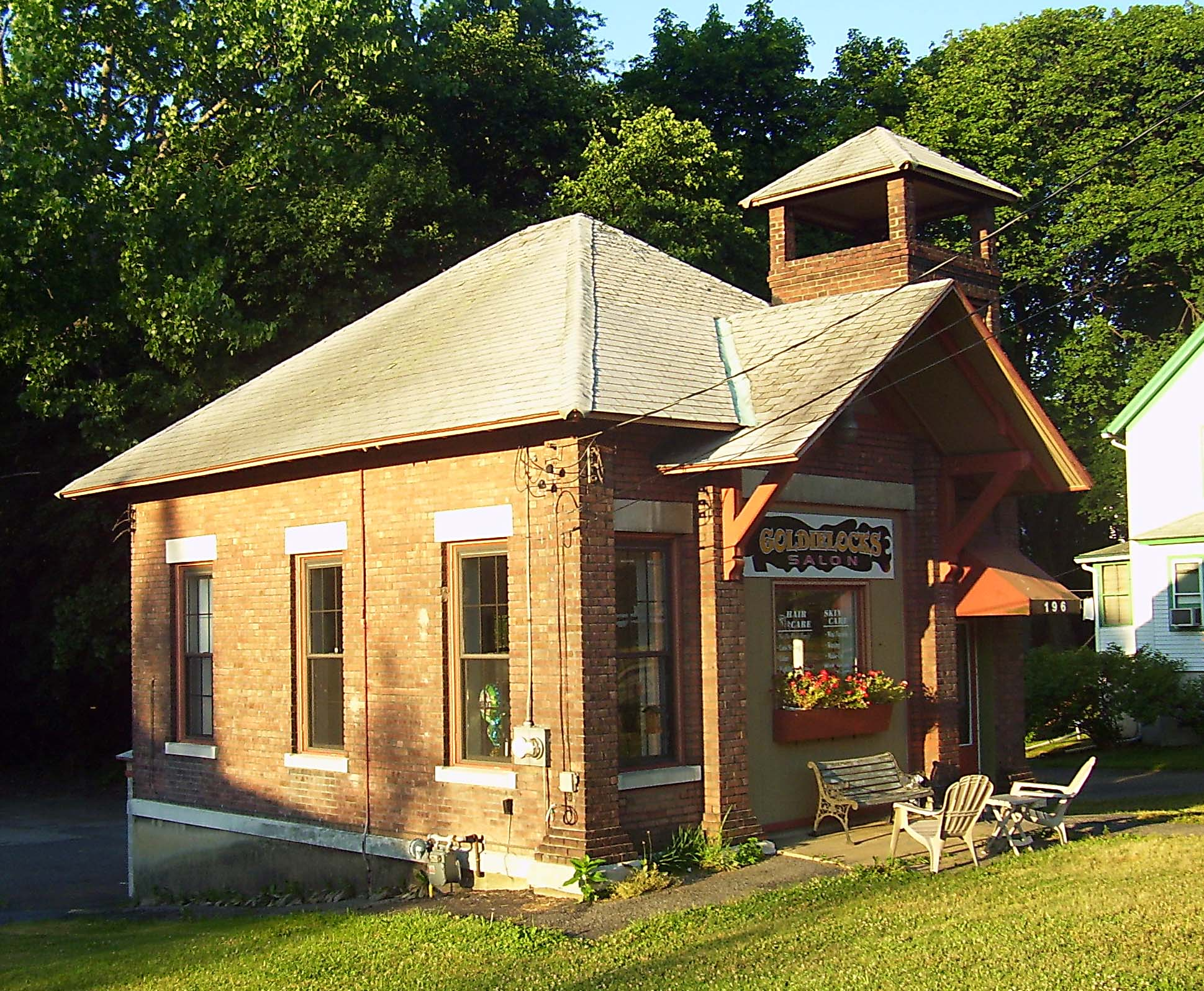
- The Firthcliffe Firehouse, Located in Firthcliffe

- Location in Orange County and the state of New York.

- Location within the state of New York
- Coordinates: 41°26′24″N 74°2′2″W
- Country: United States
- State: New York
- County: Orange

Area
  - Total: 3.00 sq mi (7.78 km^{2})
  - Land: 2.97 sq mi (7.69 km^{2})
  - Water: 0.035 sq mi (0.09 km^{2})
- Elevation: 299 ft (91 m)

Population (2020)
  - Total: 5,022
  - Density: 1,690.9/sq mi (652.86/km^{2})
- Time zone: UTC-5 (Eastern (EST))
  - Summer (DST): UTC-4 (EDT)
- FIPS code: 36-25857
- GNIS feature ID: 0950117

Firthcliffe is a hamlet (and census-designated place) in Orange County, New York United States. The population was 5,022 at the 2020 Census. It is part of the Kiryas Joel–Poughkeepsie–Newburgh, NY Metropolitan Statistical Area as well as the larger New York–Newark–Bridgeport, NY-NJ-CT-PA Combined Statistical Area.

Firthcliffe is in the Town of Cornwall.

== Geography ==
Firthcliffe is located at 41°26′24″N 74°2′2″W (41.440084, -74.033783).

According to the United States Census Bureau, the CDP has a total area of 3.0 square miles (7.8 km^{2}), of which, 3.0 square miles (7.8 km^{2}) of it is land and 0.04 square miles (0.10 km^{2}) of it (0.99%) is water.

Firthcliffe is named after the now defunct Firth Carpet Company, located on Mill Street, that built many of the homes on Firth street in the Firthcliffe area of the Town of Cornwall.

== Demographics ==
Historical population
Census	Pop.	Note	%±
2010	4,949		—
2020	5,022		1.5%
U.S. Decennial Census

=== 2020 census ===
As of the 2020 census, Firthcliffe had a population of 5,022. The median age was 43.0 years. 21.6% of residents were under the age of 18 and 19.4% of residents were 65 years of age or older. For every 100 females there were 91.1 males, and for every 100 females age 18 and over there were 89.1 males age 18 and over.

98.6% of residents lived in urban areas, while 1.4% lived in rural areas.

There were 2,034 households in Firthcliffe, of which 30.5% had children under the age of 18 living in them. Of all households, 47.8% were married-couple households, 15.9% were households with a male householder and no spouse or partner present, and 29.8% were households with a female householder and no spouse or partner present. About 31.6% of all households were made up of individuals and 15.8% had someone living alone who was 65 years of age or older.

There were 2,170 housing units, of which 6.3% were vacant. The homeowner vacancy rate was 2.0% and the rental vacancy rate was 3.0%.

Racial composition as of the 2020 census
Race	Number	Percent
White	3,910	77.9%
Black or African American	228	4.5%
American Indian and Alaska Native	14	0.3%
Asian	169	3.4%
Native Hawaiian and Other Pacific Islander	0	0.0%
Some other race	240	4.8%
Two or more races	461	9.2%
Hispanic or Latino (of any race)	680	13.5%

=== 2000 census ===
As of the census of 2000, there were 4,970 people, 1,965 households, and 1,349 families residing in the CDP. The population density was 1,649.0 inhabitants per square mile (636.7/km^{2}). There were 2,065 housing units at an average density of 685.1 per square mile (264.5/km^{2}). The racial makeup of the CDP was 94.35% White, 1.19% African American, 0.12% Native American, 1.11% Asian, 1.41% from other races, and 1.83% from two or more races. Hispanic or Latino of any race were 6.32% of the population.

There were 1,965 households, out of which 34.9% had children under the age of 18 living with them, 55.6% were married couples living together, 9.9% had a female householder with no husband present, and 31.3% were non-families. 27.7% of all households were made up of individuals, and 13.7% had someone living alone who was 65 years of age or older. The average household size was 2.51 and the average family size was 3.10.

In the CDP, the population was spread out, with 27.0% under the age of 18, 5.3% from 18 to 24, 29.9% from 25 to 44, 22.9% from 45 to 64, and 15.0% who were 65 years of age or older. The median age was 38 years. For every 100 females, there were 87.0 males. For every 100 females age 18 and over, there were 82.8 males.

The median income for a household in the CDP was $55,125, and the median income for a family was $65,795. Males had a median income of $46,742 versus $32,476 for females. The per capita income for the CDP was $24,894. About 4.4% of families and 6.7% of the population were below the poverty line, including 10.7% of those under age 18 and 4.6% of those age 65 or over.
