= Storm King Art Center =

Outdoor museum of sculptures

Coordinates: 41.42514°N 74.05930°W

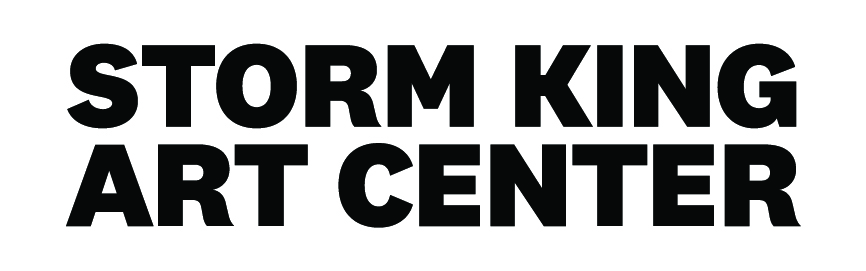
- Established: 1960
- Location: Mountainville, New York, US
- Director: Nora Lawrence
- Public transit access: Beacon, Salisbury Mills–Cornwall
- Website: stormking.org

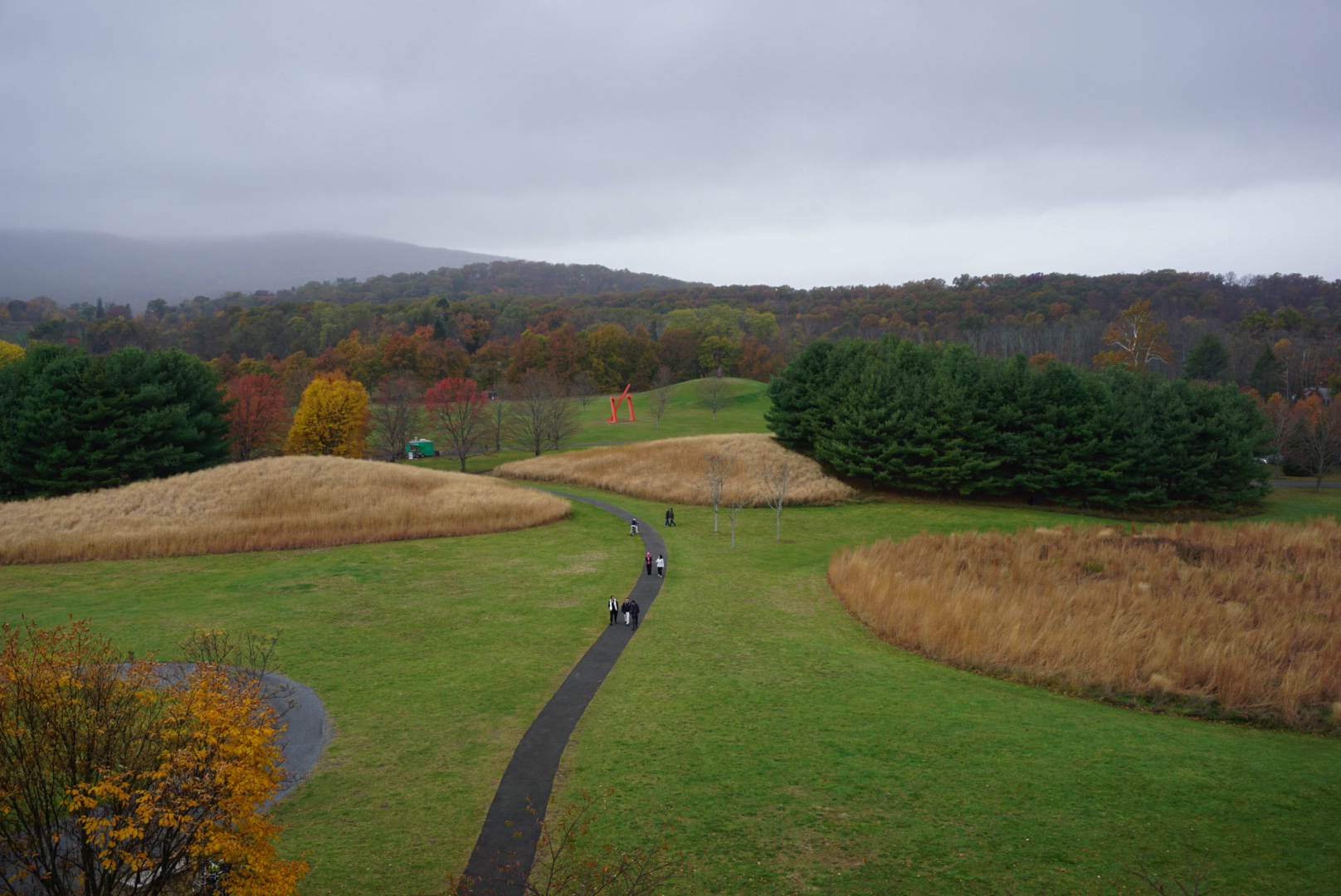
Storm King grounds

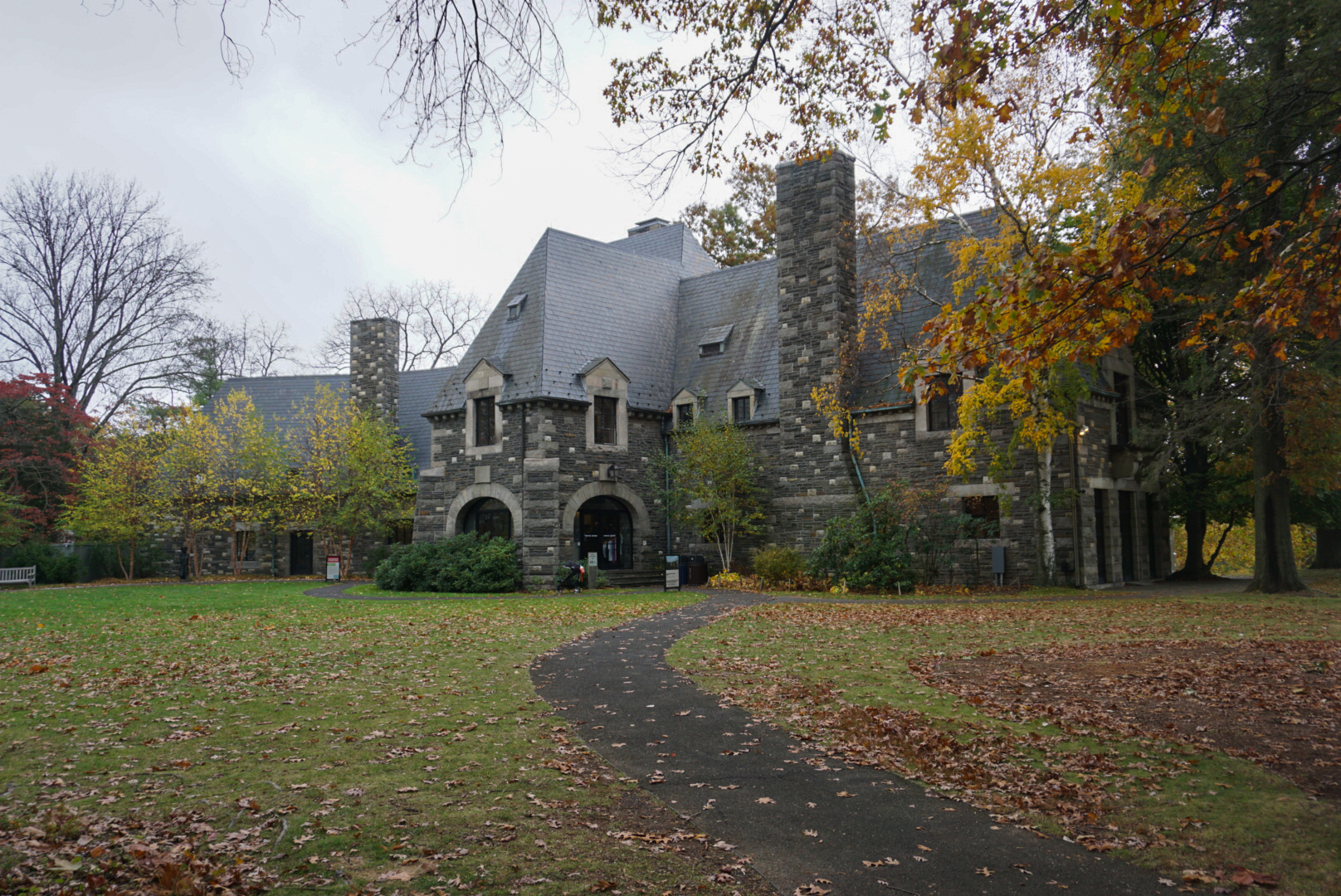
Museum building

Storm King Art Center, commonly called Storm King and named for nearby Storm King Mountain, is an open-air museum near New Windsor, New York. It contains perhaps the largest collection of contemporary outdoor sculptures in the United States. Founded in 1960 by Ralph E. Ogden as a museum for Hudson River School paintings, it soon became a major sculpture venue with works from some of the most acclaimed artists of the 20th century. The site covers about 500 acres (200 ha; 0.78 sq mi), and is located about a one-hour drive north of Manhattan.

== History ==
In early 1958, after retiring from a successful career in his family's business, Star Expansion Company, Ralph E. Ogden purchased a 180-acre estate in Mountainville, New York. In 1960, he opened his land to the public as Storm King Art Center, displaying several small sculptures he bought in Europe. In 1967, he added 13 pieces that he bought from sculptor David Smith.

The center's first sculptures were exhibited around its main building, and the collection expanded over time out into the landscape. The landscape and the main house were redesigned first by landscape architect William Rutherford and his wife Joyce Rutherford, and later by Ogden's previous business partner, Peter Stern, who had become the center's chairman and president, followed by David Collins, the center's director. Stern continued to run the center after Ogden's death in 1974, and added many of its most well-known pieces.

In 1975, five monumental works by Mark di Suvero on display at the Whitney Museum of American Art were saved from being dismantled and packed away when Peter Stern asked the artist if the sculptures could be displayed at Storm King. The pieces are now prominently displayed in its South Fields.

Throughout the latter part of the 20th century, the center added to its permanent collection and exhibited works in circulation from other museums. For example, the Museum of Modern Art loaned four sculptures to the center for a year-long exhibition when its sculpture garden underwent construction in 1982.

In 1985, the Star Expansion Company donated two tracts of land for the center's 25th anniversary: 2,300 acres (930 ha; 3.6 sq mi) on nearby Schunnemunk Mountain, which is the backdrop for many of the center's monumental sculptures; and a 100-acre (40 ha; 0.16 sq mi) piece of farmland next to the center, which has been used to house new additions to the collection.

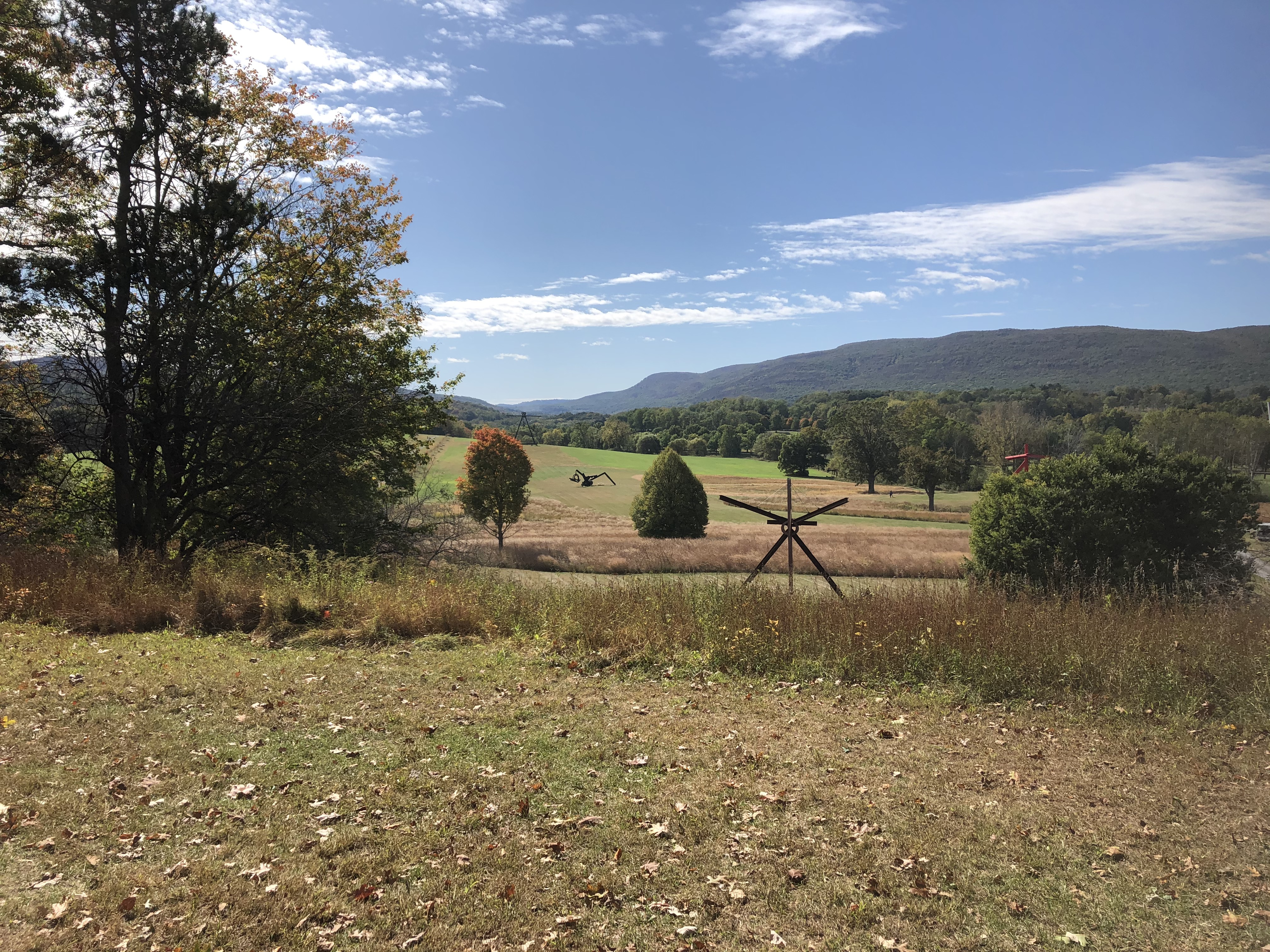
Field with di Suvero sculptures

== Collection ==
The core collection includes pieces by modern masters, such as Alexander Calder, David Smith, Mark di Suvero, Henry Moore, Douglas Abdell, Isamu Noguchi, Richard Serra, Ursula von Rydingsvard, and Louise Nevelson. It also includes large sculptures by contemporary sculptors, including Magdalena Abakanowicz, Alice Aycock, Andy Goldsworthy, Alexander Liberman, Sol LeWitt, Martin Puryear, and Roy Lichtenstein. Maya Lin's Storm King Wavefield (2009), one of the newer additions to the collection, consists of seven long rows of undulating land forms.

== Grounds ==
The permanent collection of monumental works is situated throughout the grounds in four main areas: the North Woods, a wooded section in the northeast corner of the property; Museum Hill, an elevated portion on the east edge of the property along the Moodna Creek with views of the surrounding land and its sculptures; the Meadows, which includes the western edge of the park and its entrance; and the South Fields, an open expanse in the southwest portion of the center.

The landscape of Storm King Art Center has been specifically reshaped. The grounds were shaped for each new monumental work of art, and particularly for site-specific works. The plateau on which stands a 1935 residence, designed to resemble a Norman chateau and later converted to the museum building, was torn apart in the 1950s by bulldozers gathering gravel for the construction of the New York State Thruway; it had to be rebuilt when the art center was established on the grounds.

Storm King Art Center offers numerous programs for members and everyday visitors to the grounds, including bicycles available for rent and guided trolley rides.

== Leadership ==
In January 2025, Nora Lawrence was appointed the Art Center’s first Executive Director. Lawrence previously served as Artistic Director and Chief Curator. With the change, President John P. Stern transitioned to President and Senior Advisor to the Board.

== Influence ==
Collector Alan Gibbs said Storm King was a source of inspiration for Gibbs Farm, his private outdoor sculpture museum and landscape in New Zealand.

== See also ==
- List of sculpture parks
