= Mountainville, New York =

Mountainville
- Hamlet
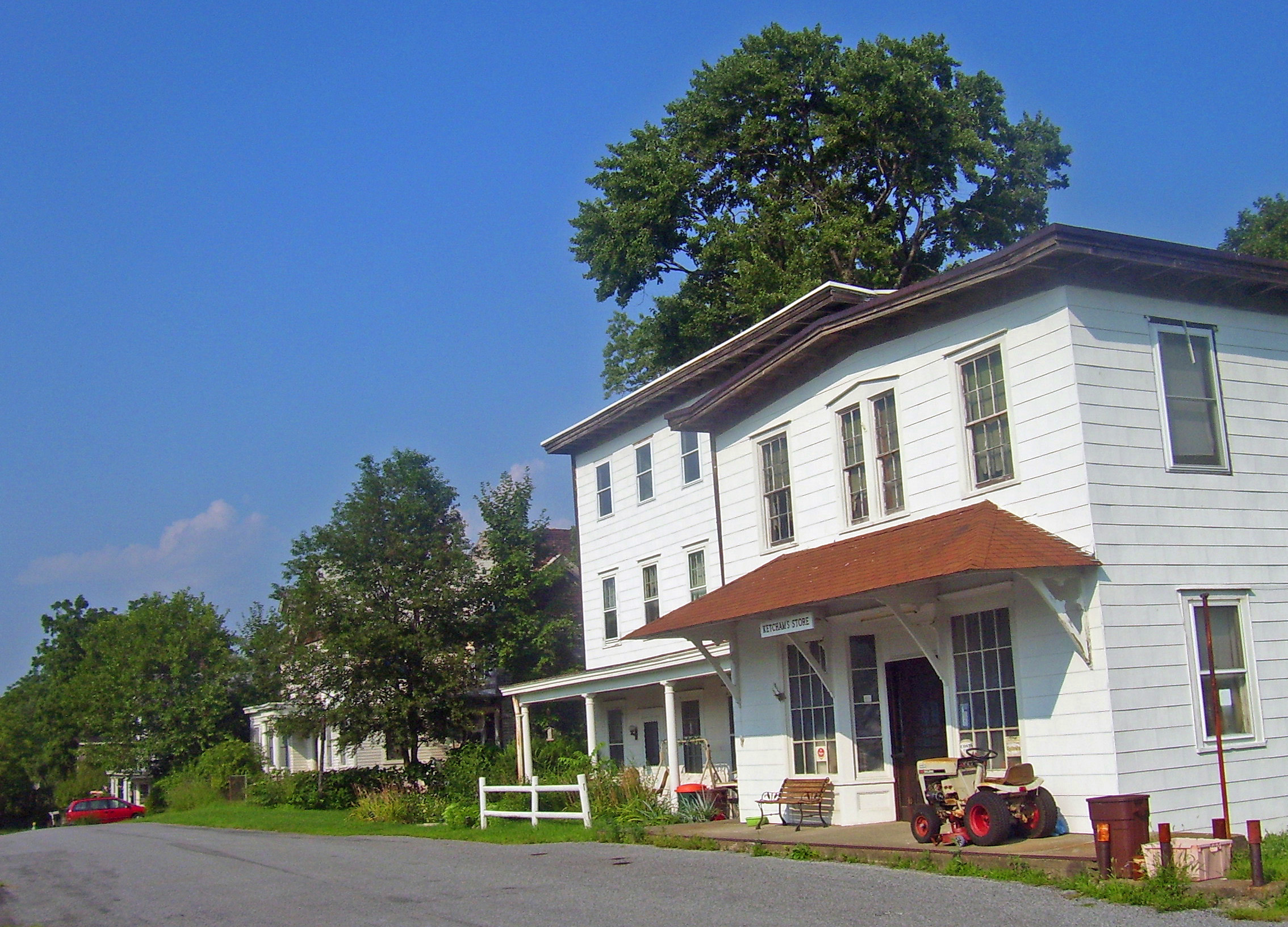
- An image of Downtown Mountainville, NY

- Location within New York
- Coordinates: 41°24′N 74°04′W
- Country: United States
- State: New York
- County: Orange
- Time zone: UTC-5 (Eastern (EST))
  - Summer (DST): UTC-4 (EDT)
- ZIP Code: 10953

Mountainville is a hamlet in the western section of the town of Cornwall, in Orange County, New York, United States. It is mostly wooded, lightly populated area, located in the narrow valley of Woodbury and Moodna creeks between Schunemunk Mountain and the Hudson Highlands. The New York State Thruway and NY 32 run through the hamlet. It has the ZIP Code 10953.

While signs along the highway suggests it includes almost the entire portion of Route 32 in the town, the population is centered in the area around Taylor Road between 32 and the Thruway. There is a small central area with a post office and fire department. Storm King Art Center is located in Mountainville. Famous water color artist Winslow Homer spent a year in Mountainville as a young artist and many of his pastoral themed water colors were made there.
