= Cornwall, New York =

Cornwall
- Town
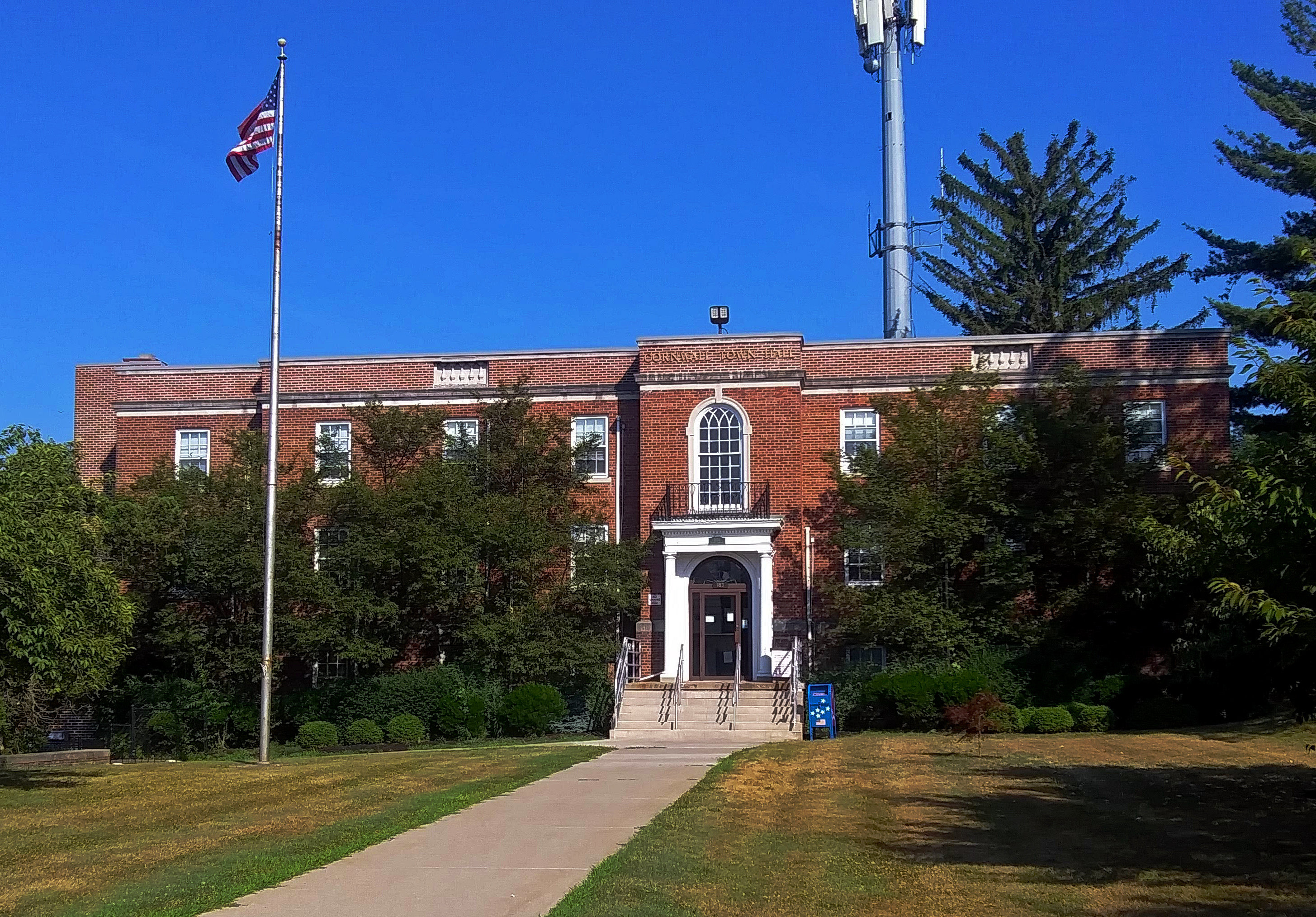
- Town hall
- Etymology: from Cornwall, England
- Location in Orange County and the state of New York.

- Location of New York in the United States
- Coordinates: 41°26′04″N 74°02′09″W
- Country: United States
- State: New York
- County: Orange
- Founded: 1685

Government
  - Town Supervisor: Joshua Wojehowski (DEM) Town Council: Rokhsha Michael-Razi (DEM); J. Kerry McGuinness (REP); Virginia Scott (DEM); Timothy McCarty (CON)

Area
  - Total: 28.13 sq mi (72.86 km^{2})
  - Land: 26.65 sq mi (69.03 km^{2})
  - Water: 1.48 sq mi (3.83 km^{2})
- Elevation: 240 ft (73 m)
- Highest elevation (Southwestern town line, on Schunemunk Mountain): 1,540 ft (470 m)

Population (2020)
  - Total: 12,884
  - Density: 468.2/sq mi (180.79/km^{2})
- Time zone: UTC-5 (Eastern (EST))
  - Summer (DST): UTC-4 (EDT)
- ZIP Code: 12518, 12520
- Area code: 845
- FIPS code: 36-071-18300
- FIPS code: 36-18300
- GNIS feature ID: 0978869
- Wikimedia Commons: Cornwall, New York
- Website: cornwallny.com

Cornwall is a town in Orange County, New York, United States, approximately 50 miles (80 km) north of New York City on the western shore of the Hudson River. As of the 2020 census, the population was at 12,884. Cornwall has become a bedroom community for cities in the Hudson Valley and Greater New York metropolitan areas; commuter rail service to North Jersey and New York City is available via the Salisbury Mills–Cornwall train station, operated by NJ Transit on behalf of Metro-North Railroad, and the town is located less than an hour from the George Washington Bridge with access to major commuter routes such as the New York State Thruway and the Palisades Parkway. Cornwall also has a noteworthy connection with the United States Military, largely due to its geographic proximity to West Point and local airport infrastructure.

Cornwall's Main Street includes gift shops, taverns, restaurants, coffeehouses, yoga studios and boutiques. Government offices, churches, parks, the riverfront, and St. Luke's Cornwall Hospital, a part of the Montefiore Health System, are situated within walking distance of downtown. The town is a designated Tree City.

Cornwall was the top selection to represent New York State in "The Best Places to Raise Kids 2013" by Bloomberg Business Week magazine.

The television show Best Medicine is filmed on location in Cornwall.

== Infrastructural Developments ==
Some of the infrastructural developments that took place in Cornwall in the past few decades are:

- Construction of a new Village hall on Hudson Street in 1997, replacing the old one built in 1872. The new village hall features a clock tower, a meeting room, and offices for various departments.
- Expansion and renovation of the Cornwall Public Library in 2001, which included more space for books, computers, and programs. The library also received a grant from the Bill & Melinda Gates Foundation to upgrade its technology equipment.
- Completion of a new wastewater treatment plant on Shore Road in 2005. The new plant has a capacity of 1.5 million gallons per day and uses ultraviolet disinfection to reduce pollutants.
- Installation of a solar array on the roof of the Cornwall Central High School in 2012. The project was funded by a grant from the New York State Energy Research and Development Authority (NYSERDA).
- Construction of a new bridge over Moodna Creek on Route 32 in 2018.

== Government ==
=== Local government ===
Some of the changes in local government that occurred in Cornwall in the past few years include:

- The adoption of a new comprehensive plan for Cornwall in 2006.
- The establishment of a town ethics board in 2010.
- The creation of a town website in 2011.

=== Federal government ===
A portion of the West Point Military Reservation is in Cornwall.

== Education ==
Cornwall has a public school district that serves about 3,000 students in five schools: Cornwall Elementary School, Willow Avenue Elementary School, Cornwall-on-Hudson Elementary School, Cornwall Central Middle School, and Cornwall Central High School. The district offers various academic programs and extracurricular activities.

Cornwall also has two private schools: New York Military Academy (NYMA) and Storm King School. NYMA is a coeducational boarding school for grades 7-12 that offers a military-style education with an emphasis on leadership, character, and academics. NYMA was founded in 1889 and has produced notable alumni such as Donald Trump, Stephen Sondheim, and John Gotti Jr. Storm King School is a coeducational boarding and day school for grades 8-12 that offers a college preparatory curriculum with an emphasis on arts, sciences, and global citizenship. Storm King School was founded in 1867 and has produced notable alumni such as Whiting Willauer, Robert Torricelli, Walter Reade, Jack Hemingway, Cara Castronuova, Wally Pfister, and Balazs Szabo.

== Culture ==
Cornwall has a rich cultural heritage that includes:

- The Cornwall Historical Society Museum.
- The Hudson Highlands Nature Museum.
- The annual RiverFest.
- The Cornwall Fall Festival.
- Storm King Art Center.

== History ==
When the explorer Henry Hudson visited the region in 1609, the land was occupied by the Waoraneck Indians. In 1685—which is regarded as the establishment date of Cornwall on local signage—a colony of twenty-five Scottish families settled around the mouth of the Moodna Creek, led by the soldier Major Patrick McGregor and his brother-in-law, David Toiseach, the laird of Monzievaird. In the ensuing 50 years, English and Scottish families came to the fertile tableland above the river meadows naming it "new Cornwall" because of the marked similarity to the County of Cornwall, England, It is believed that the hamlet of Canterbury was the site of this settlement. The first recorded town meeting was held in April 1765, shortly after the Precinct of Cornwall was created in 1764. "New Cornwall" first appears on maps and censi in 1788, after Orange County was subdivided into numerous townships. The town was officially renamed, from "New Cornwall" in 1788 to "Cornwall" in 1797. Cornwall reached a peak in prestige during the late 19th century, becoming a popular rural retreat for elites from nearby New York City.

The area that became Cornwall was part of Governor Dongan's 1685 Tract.

=== The nineteenth century ===
In the mid-19th century, Cornwall developed a reputation as a health retreat. Until the early 20th century, New Yorkers with the means frequently visited or even relocated to the Hudson Valley to experience its supposed therapeutic effects. The mountains, fresh air and evergreen forests were thought to offer the perfect conditions for good health, and they were not far from the city. Cornwall—on the west side of the Hudson—became especially popular, offering numerous boarding houses and many amenities, including accessibility to the railroad and steamboats, as well as a telegraph office and large library.

Nathaniel Parker Willis—one of the Knickerbocker writers—enjoyed the time he spent in Cornwall to the end of purchasing land in it, establishing a country home he called Idlewild; now the name of an Avenue near the river. His many writings on the area helped make Cornwall a popular spot for health-seekers. Winslow Homer, the famous water color artist, spent his summers as a young artist in the hamlet of Mountainville—then known as Ketcham Town—and many of his pastoral themed water colors were made there and depict the local scenery.

These shifting attitudes toward a more healthy lifestyle began to make the Hudson Valley popular for outdoor activities and exercise. Hiking, rowing, swimming, fishing, hunting and biking all contributed to the development in the area of summer camps as well as the notion of the summer vacation.

=== Historic buildings ===
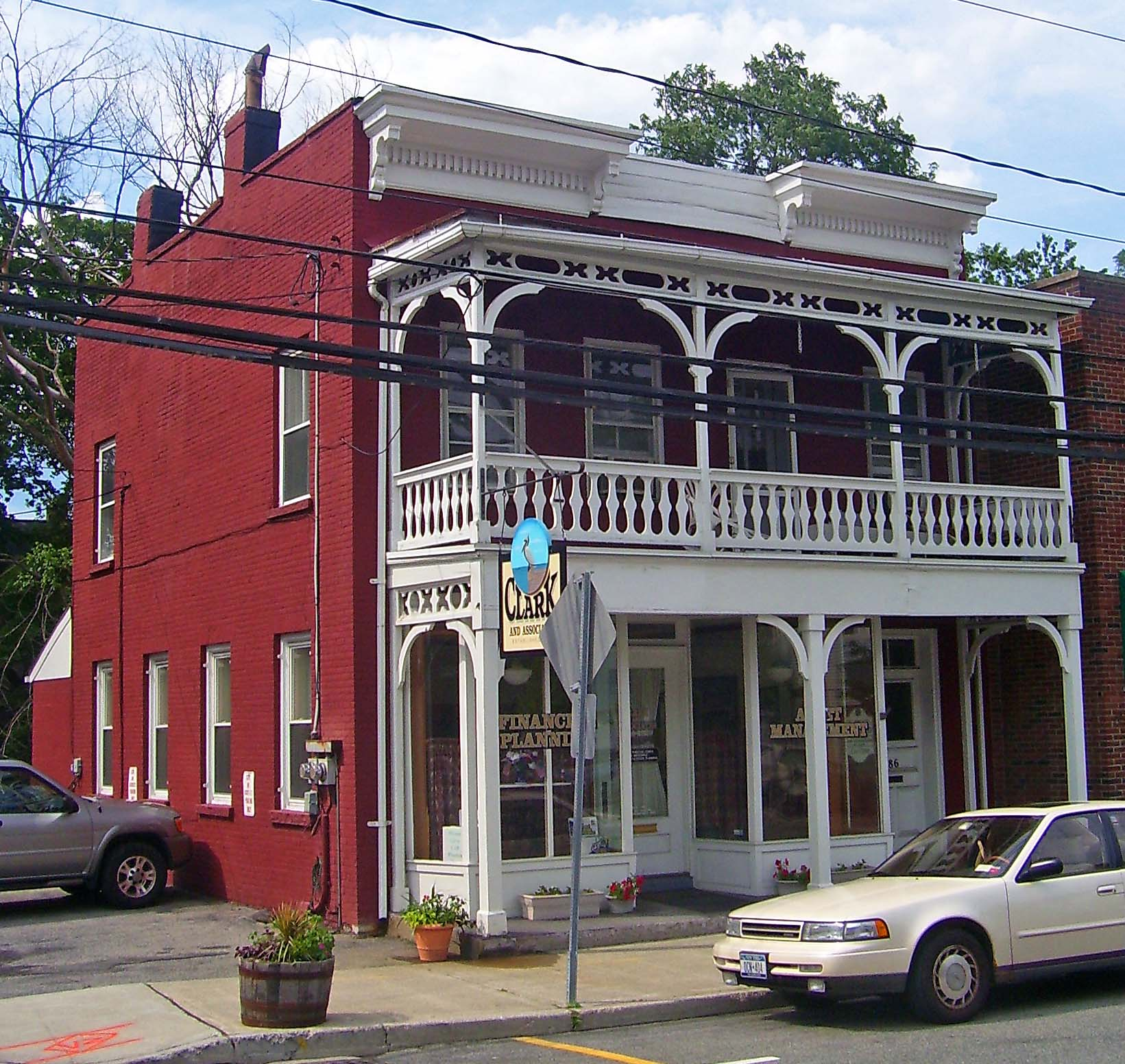
A. J. Clark Store

The A. J. Clark Store is located at 286 Main Street in downtown Cornwall. Archer Clark built the Italianate building to house his butcher shop around 1875, after an 1870 fire destroyed his earlier quarters. It would continue in existence in that building for a century. Later, one of his descendants converted it into a delicatessen. In 1996 it was added to the National Register of Historic Places as an intact commercial building dating from Cornwall's days as a summer resort town in the late 19th century.

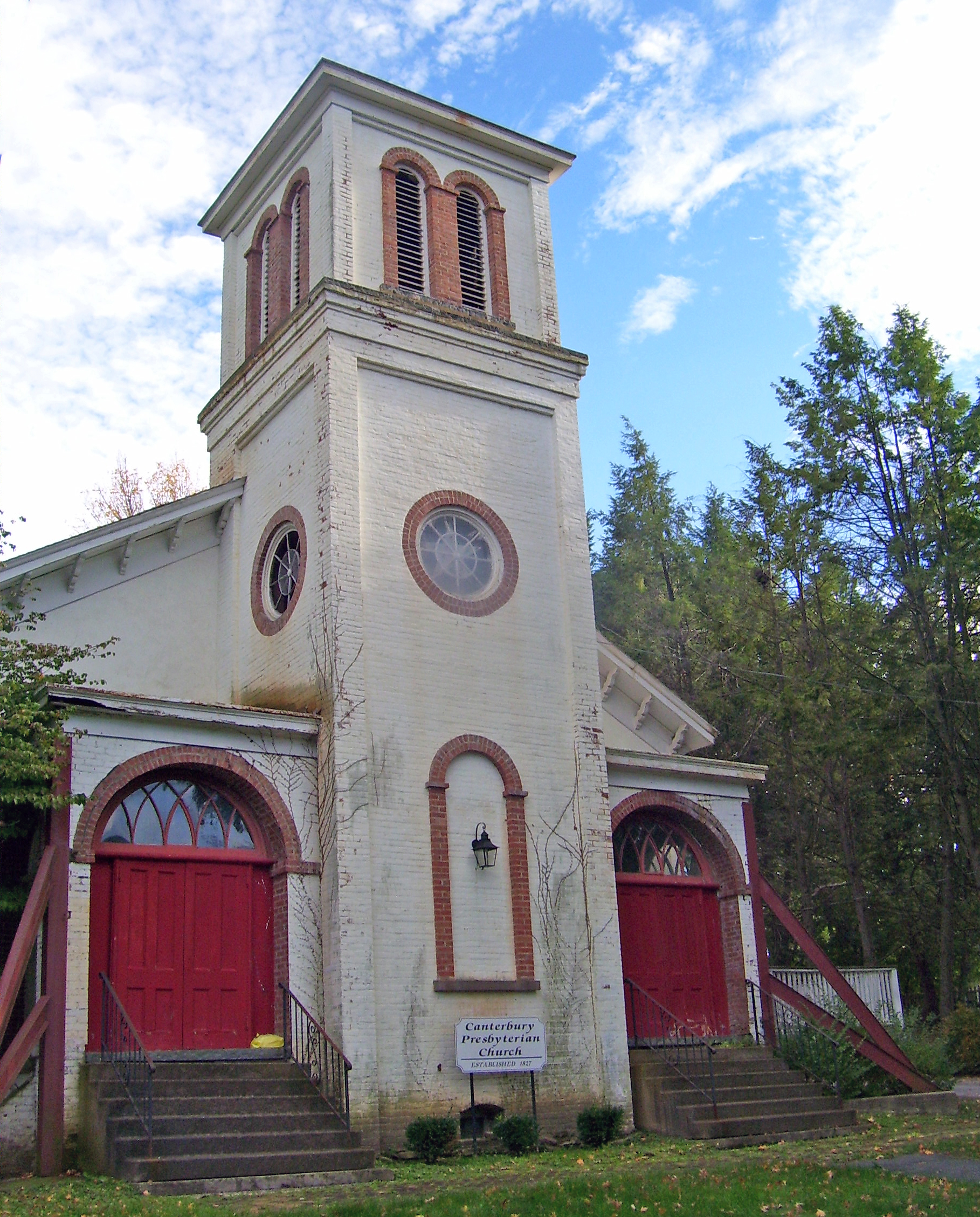
Canterbury Presbyterian Church

The Canterbury Presbyterian Church is located along Clinton Street in downtown Cornwall. A white stone and brick building in the Federal style, with later Colonial Revival style additions, it has been listed on the National Register of Historic Places since 1996. In 2018 the Church which had been in need of repairs was acquired and converted in to a dance studio. This helped fund repairs to support the history of the building.

The Carvey–Gatfield House is a stone house along Angola Road in Cornwall. It was built in the first decade of the 19th century in the Federal style. The land was originally the property of Isaac Bobbin, an early settler, until subdivided into the present parcel and sold to Mathias Carvey in 1805, around the time the house was built. Carvey had bought the property from William Robinson, two owners removed from Bobbin, to support his mill on a nearby stream. He in turn sold it to Benjamin Gatfield, in whose family it would remain for almost a century. It was added to the National Register of Historic Places in 1996.

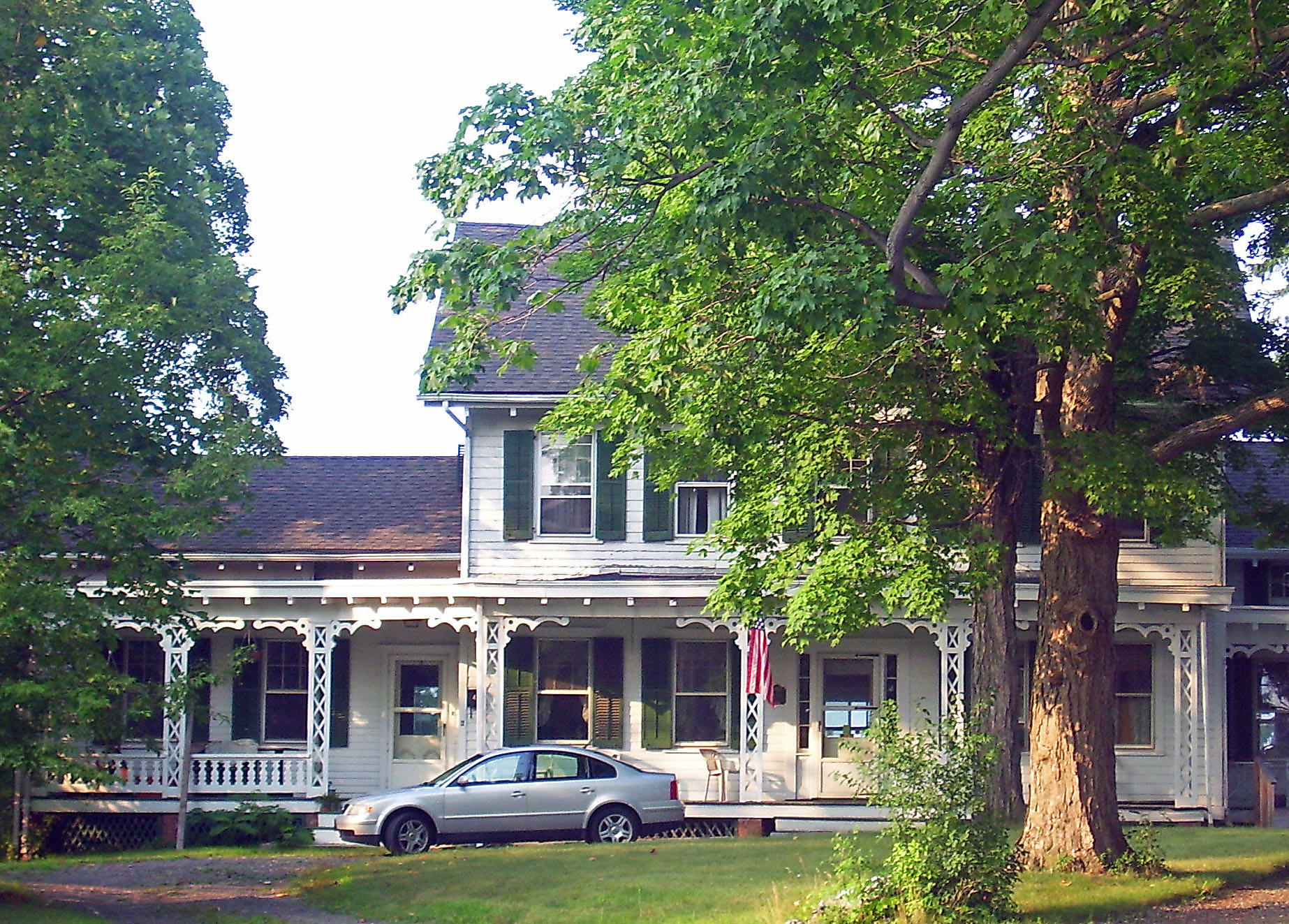
Oliver Brewster House

The Oliver Brewster House is a Gothic Revival home located on Willow Avenue, across from Willow Avenue Elementary School. It was originally built as a farmhouse in the mid-19th century. Later, as Cornwall became a popular summer resort for visitors from New York City, it was expanded and renovated for use as a boardinghouse as well. In 1996 it was added to the National Register of Historic Places.

The Samuel Brooks House is located on Pleasant Hill Road north of the hamlet of Mountainville. Brooks, a descendant of one of Cornwall's oldest families, built this as a farmhouse around 1860. After the Civil War, summer boarders from New York City began coming to Cornwall, and Brooks quickly adapted it for use as a boardinghouse. Its location, near Schunemunk Mountain made it a desirable location for the summer boarders who made Cornwall a popular resort community in the late 19th century. In 1996 it was listed on the National Register of Historic Places.

Sands Ring Homestead is located on Main Street. It was built in the late 1700s and was occupied by the Sands and Ring families until 1907. The house was prominent during the American Revolution when, it is believed, that George Washington stopped at the house to visit David Sands the occupant at the time. Revolutionary War soldiers marched past it on their way to Knox Headquarters and then on to the Cantonment in New Windsor. In 1912 it was purchased by the Village Improvement Society where it was used as a community meeting place and a tearoom. In 1950 the town voted to take over the maintenance of the home and property. Now it is a place where school children come to learn about colonial life as part of the 4th grade curriculum. It was placed on the National Historic Registry in 1996.

=== Environmental movement ===
In 1962, a 17-year legal battle began that launched the modern-day environmental movement in the United States. Consolidated Edison proposed building a giant hydroelectric plant on the river at Storm King Mountain near Cornwall. Despite pressure from local residents, Con Ed went forward with its plan, applying to the Federal Power Commission for a license to operate such a facility.

Three years later, after hearings and appeals and more hearings, the U.S. Court of Appeals set a precedent when it sent the case back to the FPC to start the process over again. Its reasoning was based on the commission's refusal to hear much of the environmental impact testimony the first time around. For the first time in U.S. history, a court had decided that protection of natural resources was just as important as economic gain. It prompted Congress to pass the National Environmental Policy Act in 1969, which requires an environmental impact study on all major projects needing approval from the federal government.

== Geography ==
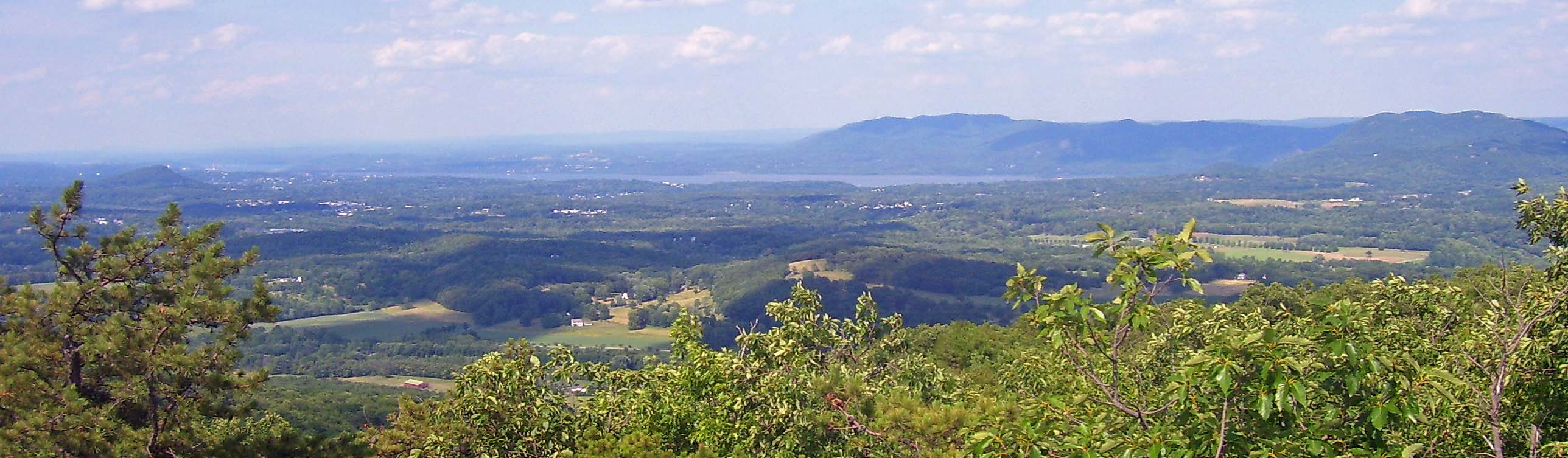
Much of the town can be seen from near its highest point on the northeast ridge of Schunemunk Mountain

The town is located 52 miles (84 km) north of New York City, and 5 miles (8.0 km) north of the United States Military Academy at West Point, in eastern Orange County. It is shaped like an irregular pentagon pointing southwards. According to the United States Census Bureau, the town has a total area of 28.2 square miles (73 km^{2}), of which 26.8 square miles (69 km^{2}) is land and 1.3 square miles (3.4 km^{2}) (4.76%) is water.

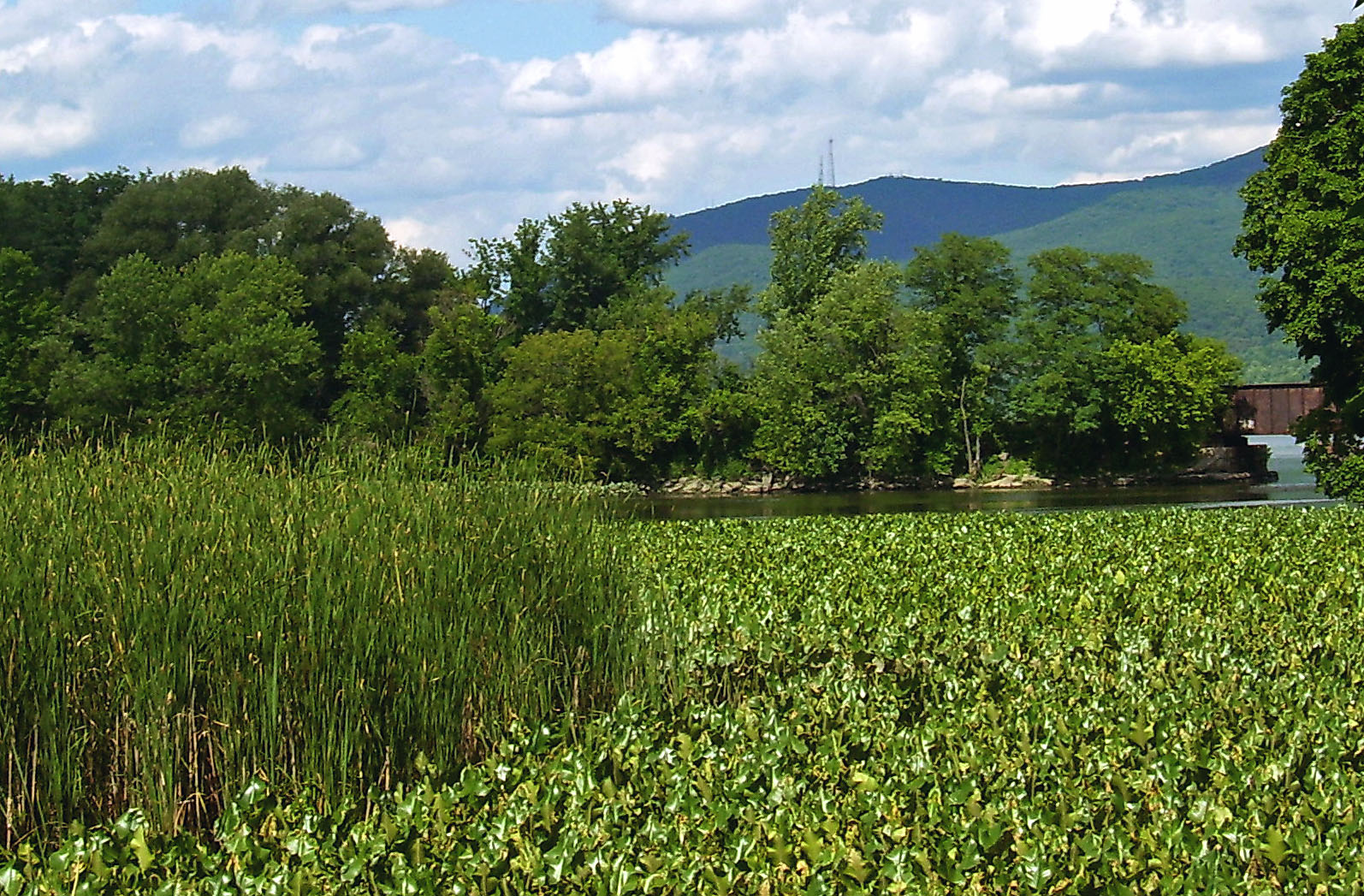
Moodna Creek estuary

Cornwall's terrain is quite diverse, with considerable relief. It is shaped by the valleys of the Moodna and Woodbury creeks, and includes estuarine salt marshes, heavily developed residential and commercial areas, rolling farms, and rocky, scrub-covered ridges and mountaintops. There are two major protected areas mostly within the town: Storm King State Park and the privately managed Black Rock Forest.

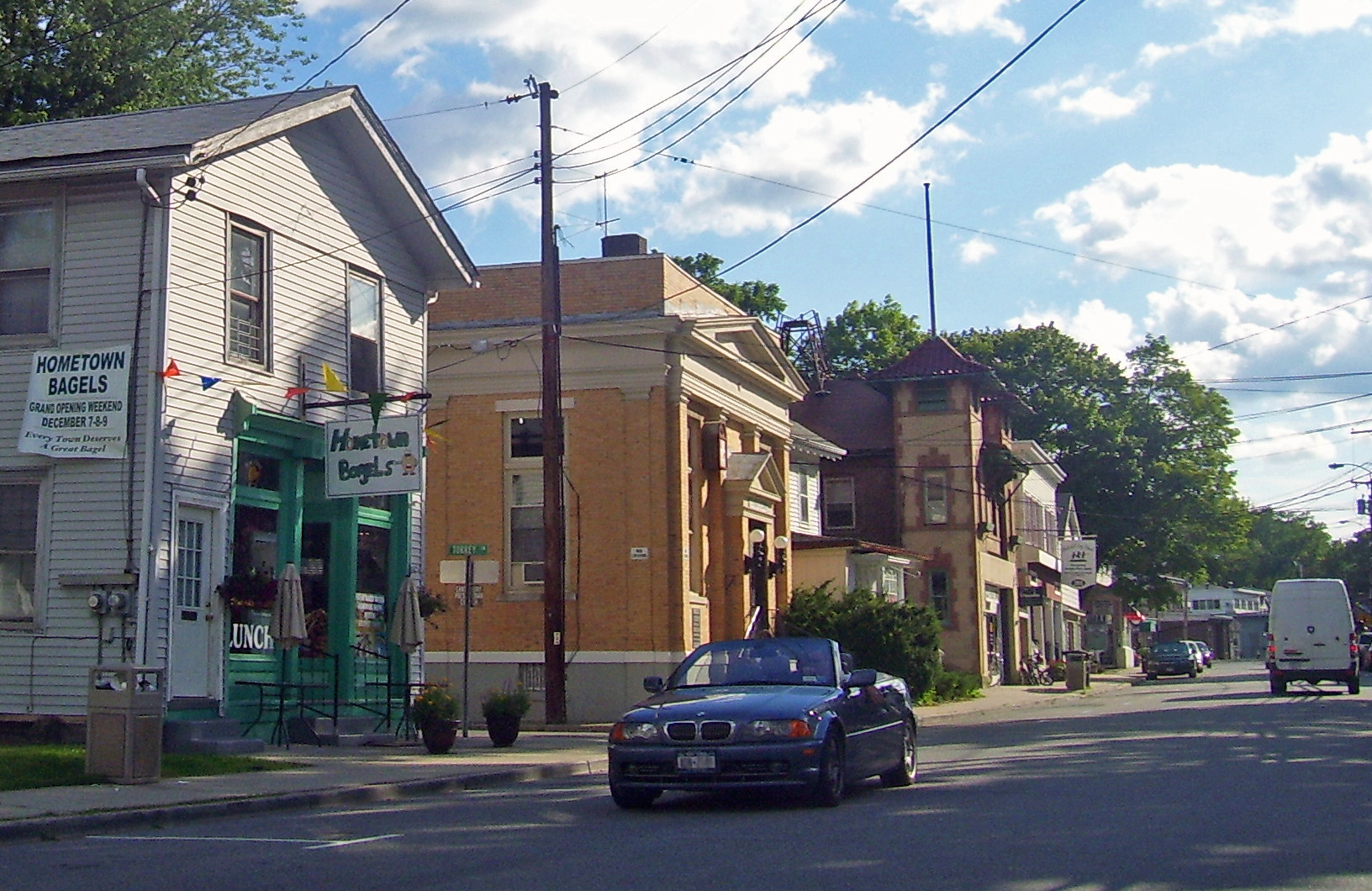
Downtown Cornwall

The most level section is in the northeast corner, east of the curve of US 9W, sloping gently to the river. Here is located the village of Cornwall-on-Hudson, and the most developed section of the town proper, the area usually meant by Cornwall, just to the southwest of the village. The Town has equal frontage on the river south of the Village but is primarily State Park land and inaccessible due to a railroad throughway. To its west lies another residential area, Firthcliffe, named for the carpet factory once located here along the banks of Moodna Creek. Much of the town's population is concentrated in the village and this area. Across the river, on its eastern shore, Cornwall borders on the towns of Fishkill and Philipstown in Dutchess and Putnam counties respectively.

In its southern section, Cornwall on Hudson rises to the high area known as Deer Hill, a foothill to Storm King Mountain to its immediate south. South of Storm King the town's southeast boundary, with Highlands, leaves the river just north of Crow's Nest and runs through Storm King State Park, taking in most of Black Rock Forest. It turns more southerly, taking in the northwestern sliver of the United States Military Academy Reservation before reaching Cornwall's southernmost point, its tripoint with Highlands and the town and village of Woodbury.

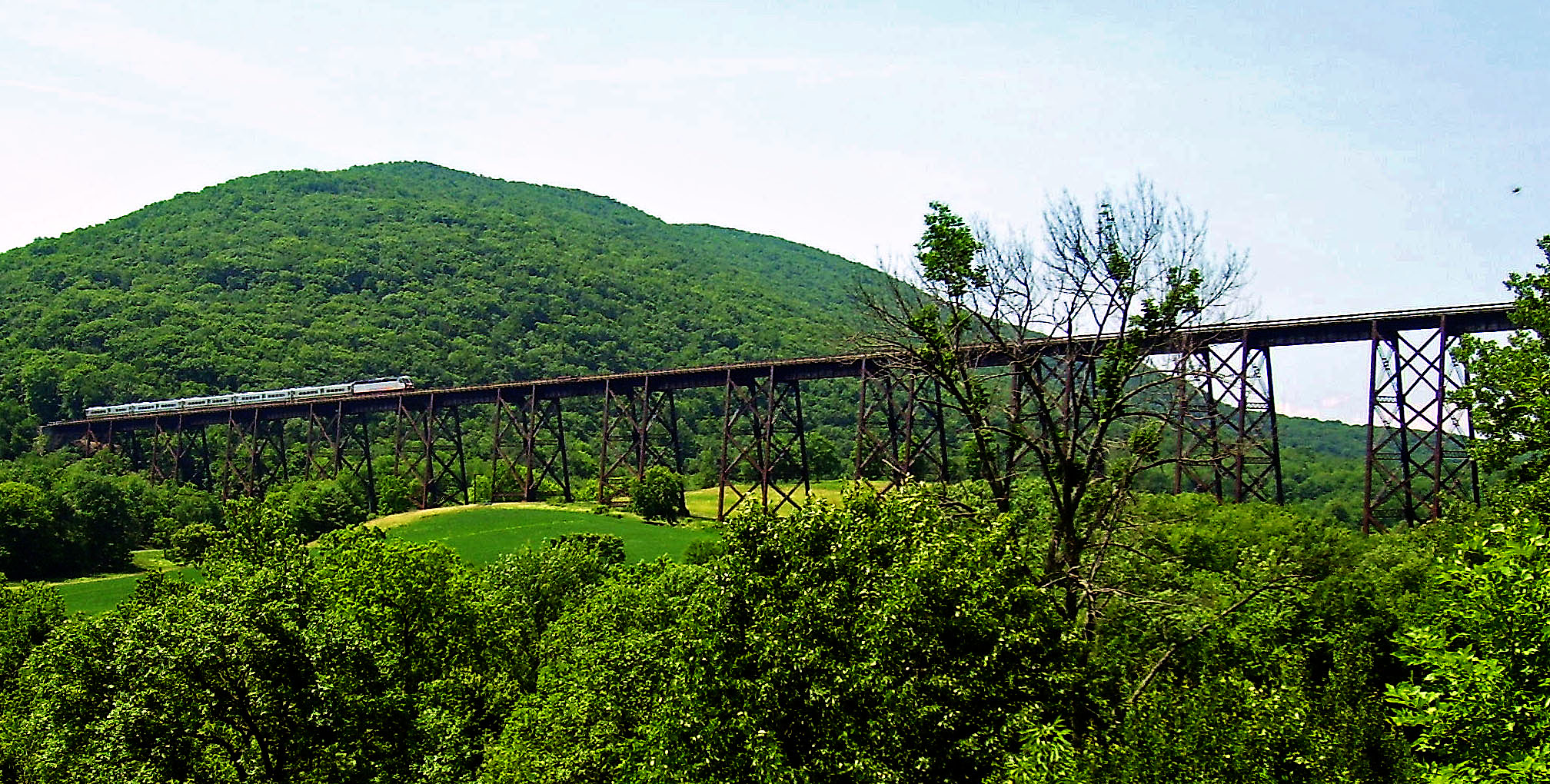
The Moodna Viaduct

This area of town is also mountainous and rugged, with the border descending along a northwesterly line to the narrow Woodbury Creek valley, where NY 32 and the New York State Thruway enter the town. At the valley's mouth, where Woodbury Creek drains into Moodna Creek, is the small hamlet of Mountainville, with its own fire district and ZIP Code. It gets its name from Schunemunk Mountain, where the town line climbs the northern end of Schunemunk, reaching the town's highest elevation at 1,540 feet (470 m) at the tripoint with Woodbury and Blooming Grove.

Just past Schunemunk's western ridge, the town line reaches another corner and changes course to due north. This takes in the rural, rolling countryside between the mountain and Salisbury Mills, where Storm King Art Center is located and the Moodna Viaduct, the highest and longest railroad trestle east of the Mississippi River, spans the valley between Schunemunk and the Salisbury Mills–Cornwall station on the Metro-North Port Jervis Line. This trestle was shown in the 2007 film Michael Clayton and is a well-known landmark. NY 94 runs through this section of town.

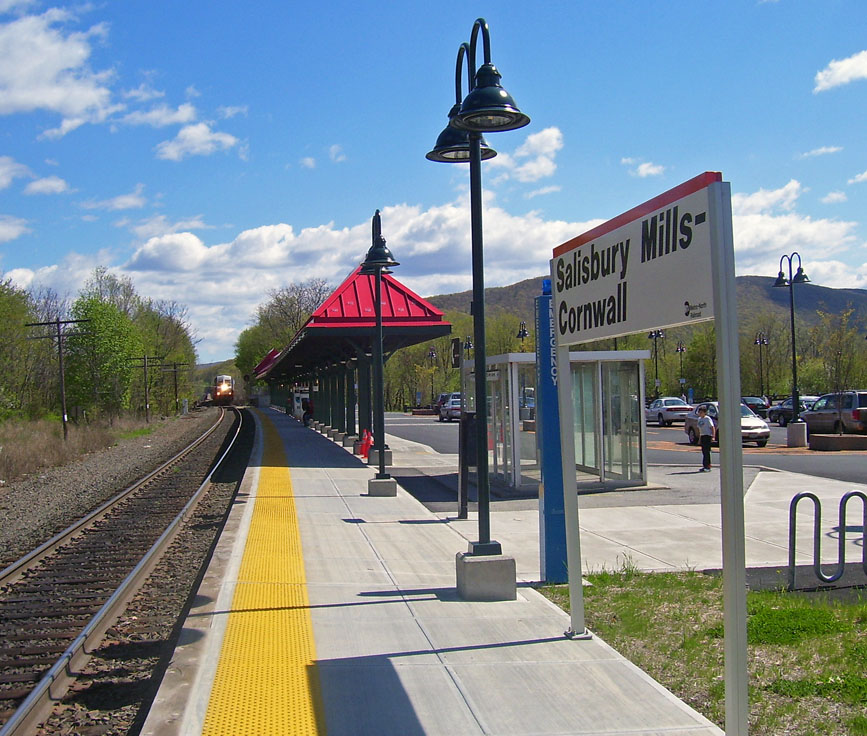
Salisbury Mills–Cornwall station is part of Metro-North Railroad's Port Jervis Line

The town's northeastern corner is another tripoint, with Blooming Grove and New Windsor, located in the middle of Beaverdam Lake. From there the New Windsor boundary runs east, trending slightly to the north, just south of the hamlet of Vails Gate back to the salt marshes where the Moodna drains into the Hudson.

Until 1953 the New York, Ontario and Western Railway operated passenger trains from the lower Catskills to Weehawken. In earlier decades the trains went to Oneida in Central New York State. Until 1958, New York Central Railroad trains carried passengers from Albany, through Cornwall to Weehawken Terminal. Cornwall was the junction point at which NYOW trains joined New York Central tracks to continue to Weehawken.

== Communities and locations in Cornwall ==
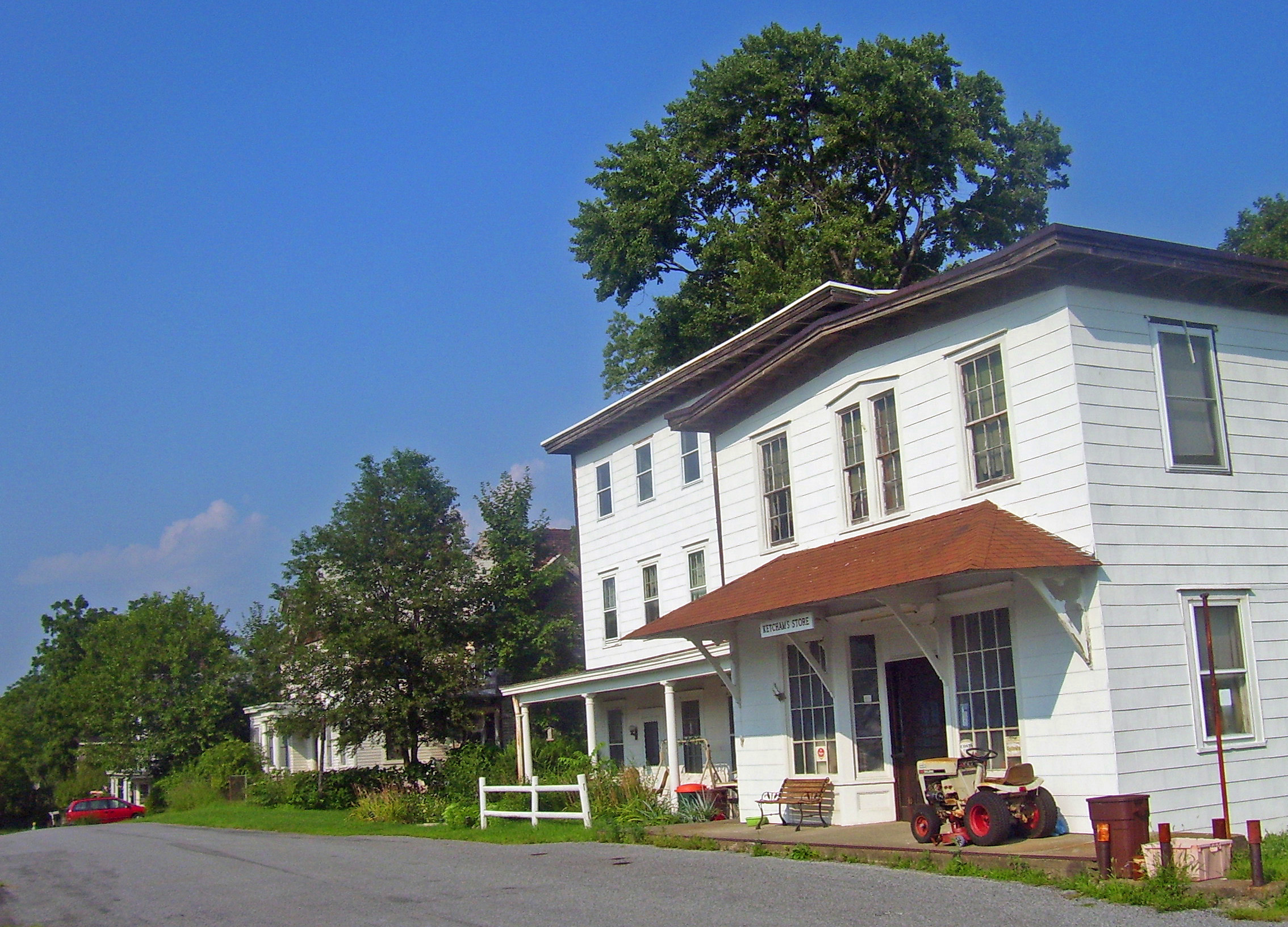
Mountainville

- Beaver Dam Lake – a hamlet in the northwestern corner of the town. It is also in the towns of New Windsor and Blooming Grove.
- Beaverdam Lake – a lake partly inside the northwestern corner of the town. It is surrounded by the community of Beaver Dam Lake.
- Black Rock Forest – a forest containing trails and amenities and a biological field station and education center.
- Cornwall-on-Hudson– a village in the eastern part of the town.
- Firthcliffe – a hamlet west of Cornwall-on-Hudson on US-9W.
- Firthcliffe Heights – a hamlet near the northern town line.
- Meadowbrook – a hamlet near the town line, west of Cornwall-on-Hudson on NY-94.
- Mountainville – a hamlet located along NY 32 in the western part of town.
- New York Military Academy – a military preparatory school.
- Orrs Mill – a hamlet south of Firthcliffe.
- Salisbury Mills – a hamlet partially in the western portion of the town. The hamlet is also in the town of Blooming Grove.
- Storm King State Park – a state park by the Hudson River.
- West Cornwall – a hamlet south of Firthecliffe, by the NY State Thruway.
- Museum of the Hudson Highlands – a park and museum.
- Storm King Art Center – an art museum and outdoor sculpture park in Mountainville.

== Demographics ==
Historical population
Census	Pop.	Note	%±
1790	4,225		—
1800	1,648		−61.0%
1810	1,769		7.3%
1820	3,020		70.7%
1830	3,486		15.4%
1840	3,925		12.6%
1850	4,471		13.9%
1860	4,800		7.4%
1870	5,989		24.8%
1880	3,833		−36.0%
1890	3,766		−1.7%
1900	4,258		13.1%
1910	5,690		33.6%
1920	4,259		−25.1%
1930	5,067		19.0%
1940	5,299		4.6%
1950	6,154		16.1%
1960	8,094		31.5%
1970	9,672		19.5%
1980	10,774		11.4%
1990	11,270		4.6%
2000	12,307		9.2%
2010	12,646		2.8%
2020	12,884		1.9%
U.S. Decennial Census

The census of 2000 recorded 12,307 people, 4,625 households, and 3,330 families residing in the town. The population density was 458.8 inhabitants per square mile (177.1/km^{2}). There were 4,852 housing units at an average density of 180.9 per square mile (69.8/km^{2}). The racial makeup of the town was 94.68% white, 1.32% African American, 0.16% Native American, 1.28% Asian, 0.05% Pacific Islander, 1.17% from other races, and 1.34% from two or more races. Hispanic or Latino of any race were 5.11% of the population.

There were 4,625 households, out of which 36.9% had children under the age of 18 living with them, 60.2% were married couples living together, 8.7% had a female householder with no husband present, and 28.0% were non-families. 24.2% of all households were made up of individuals, and 10.0% had someone living alone who was 65 years of age or older. The average household size was 2.65 and the average family size was 3.18.

In the town, the population was spread out, with 27.9% under the age of 18, 5.2% from 18 to 24, 29.6% from 25 to 44, 24.8% from 45 to 64, and 12.4% who were 65 years of age or older. The median age was 38 years. For every 100 females, there were 92.1 males. For every 100 females age 18 and over, there were 88.7 males.

The median income for a household in the town was $72,000 and the median income for a family was $87,195. Males had a median income of $52,813 versus $37,546 for females. The per capita income for the town was $28,509. About 3.7% of families and 5.0% of the population were below the poverty line, including 7.0% of those under age 18 and 3.4% of those age 65 or over.

== Notable people ==
- Suffrage, temperance, and peace activist Hannah Johnston Bailey was born in Cornwall in 1839.
- Olympic speed skater Bonnie Blair was born in Cornwall on March 18, 1964.
- Rob Cohen, motion picture director and producer, was born in Cornwall on March 12, 1949.
- David Petraeus, four-star general, graduated from Cornwall Central High School in 1970.
- Whit Stillman (born John Whitney Stillman in Washington, D.C., on January 25, 1952), an Academy Award–nominated American writer-director, grew up in Cornwall.
- Shea Farrell, actor and producer noted for playing Mark Danning in the television show Hotel created by Aaron Spelling.
- Nathaniel Parker Willis was an American author and editor who is associated with notable American writers including Harriet Ann Jacobs and Edgar Allan Poe. In 1846 Willis settled on an estate bordered to the north by Moodna Creek, naming his new home Idlewild. Because of failing health he spent the remainder of his life chiefly in retirement. The site of his property has since been used for housing, with Idlewild Avenue and Idlewild Park Drive, Cornwall-on-Hudson, commemorating his choice of name.
- Actor Armand Assante was raised in Cornwall, New York.
- Larry David and Richard Lewis first met each other at age 13 while at All America Camp in Cornwall-on-Hudson.
