= Schunemunk Mountain =

Mountain in United States of America

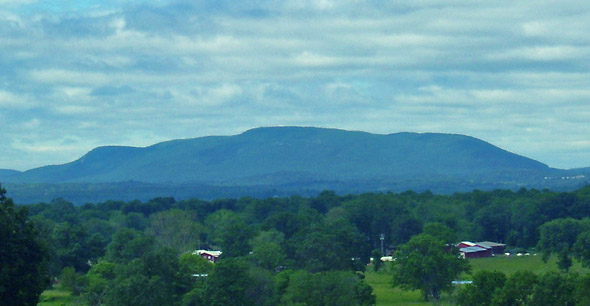
- Schunemunk Mountain from across the Hudson River

Highest point
- Elevation: 1,664 ft (507 m)
- Listing: New York County High Points 44th
- Coordinates: 41°23′30″N 74°06′59″W

Naming
- Etymology: "excellent fireplace"
- Language of name: Lenape

Geography
- Location within New York Location within the United States
- Location: Orange County, New York, U.S.
- Topo map: USGS Cornwall-on-Hudson

Climbing
- Easiest route: Hiking trail

Schunemunk Mountain (also spelled Schunnemunk) is the highest mountain in Orange County, New York. The 1,664-foot (507 m) summit is located in the town of Blooming Grove, with other portions in Cornwall and Woodbury. The community of Mountain Lodge Park is built up its western slope.

The mountain is a popular recreational resource in the area. While only the northeastern quadrant and summit are part of the recently created Schunnemunk State Park, some popular hiking trails and access routes have long crossed the privately owned lands elsewhere on the mountain. Conservationists hope that eventually the state will be able to acquire the whole mountain.

== Geography ==
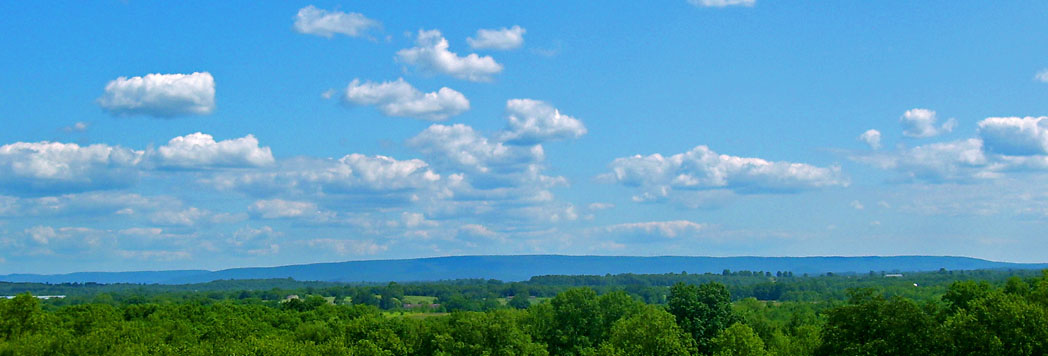
This view of Schunemunk from the west shows the full length of the ridge.

Schunemunk is a long ridge running approximately northeast–southwest between Smith's Clove and Salisbury Mills. Along the more northerly of its length, the mountain has a double crest, with Barton Swamp lying between the two ridges. The summit lies on the more southeasterly ridge. Barton Swamp is drained by Perry Creek on the south and Baby Brook on the north. Much of the eastern side of the mountain is drained by Dark Hollow Brook. These are part of the Moodna Creek watershed, which encompasses all but the southeastern tip of the mountain. Moodna Creek drains into the Hudson River. The southeastern part of the mountain drains into the watershed of the Ramapo River.

About midway along its length, on the southeastern side of the mountain, is a spur known as High Knob or High Point, which overlooks Woodbury, New York. To the northwest, across a clove, lies Woodcock Mountain or Woodcock Hill, which reaches 1,030 feet (310 m).

The New York State Thruway runs alongside Schunemunk's eastern side for the length of the mountain just north of its Harriman exit. In addition to Mountain Lodge Park, two other hamlets in the area are closely associated with the mountain: Mountainville to the northeast and Central Valley to the southeast.

Due to its height and length, Schunemunk can be seen from much of the rest of Orange County and some other nearby areas.

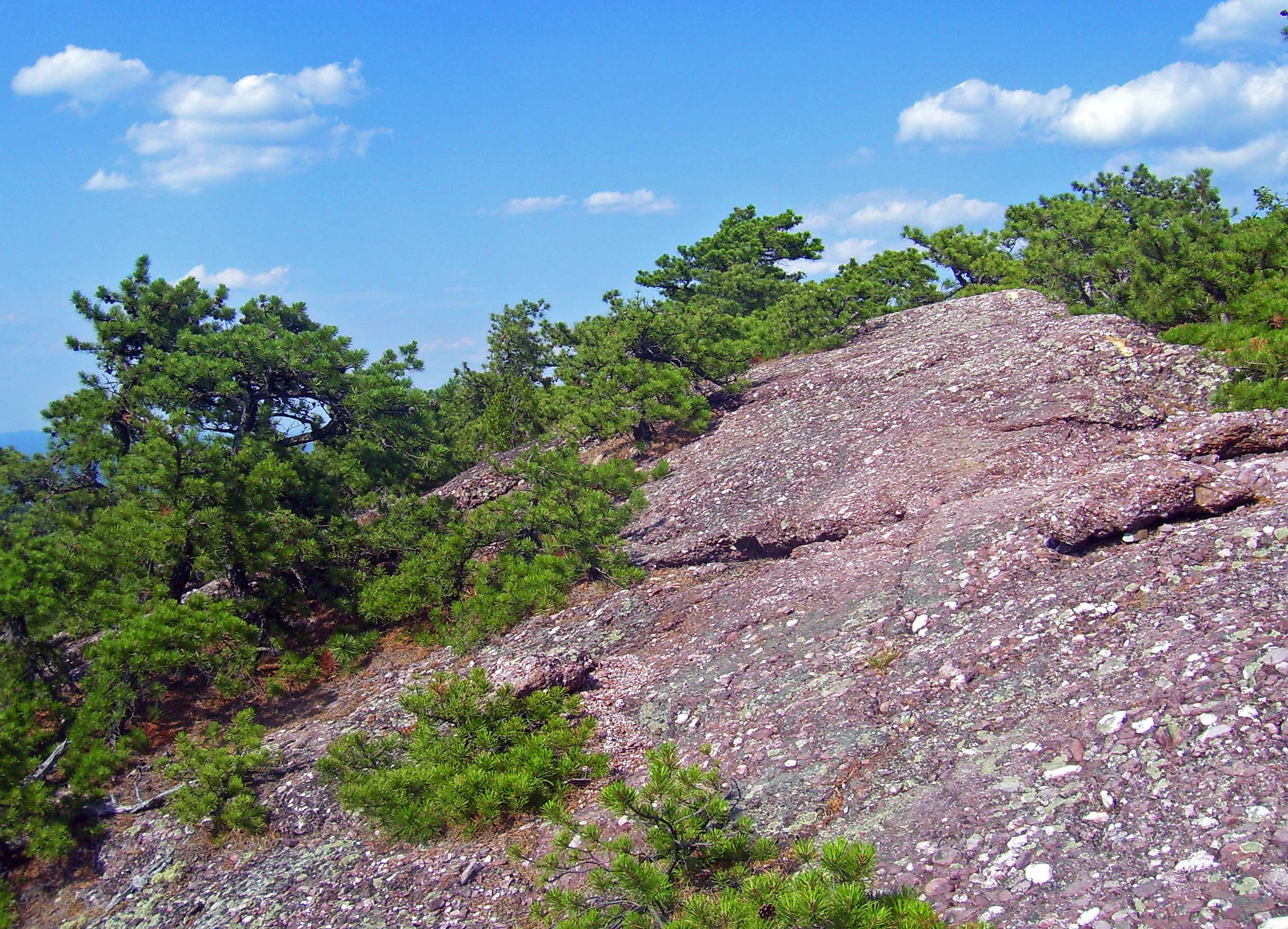
Conglomerate and scrub pine on the summit ridges.

== Geology ==
Schunemunk is geologically dissimilar from nearby mountains in the Hudson Highlands, being formed from sedimentary deposits including conglomerate. Later faulting created the long cleft that is now Barton Swamp.

== History ==
The name "Schunemunk" means "excellent fireplace" in Lenape, and the Lenni Lenape had a village on the northern tip of the mountain. During the American Revolution, the mountain was often the site of skirmishing between Tory and Patriot irregulars.

The mountain is under increasing development pressure, but the northern part has become Schunnemunk State Park, and a small portion of the southern part forms Woodbury Park.

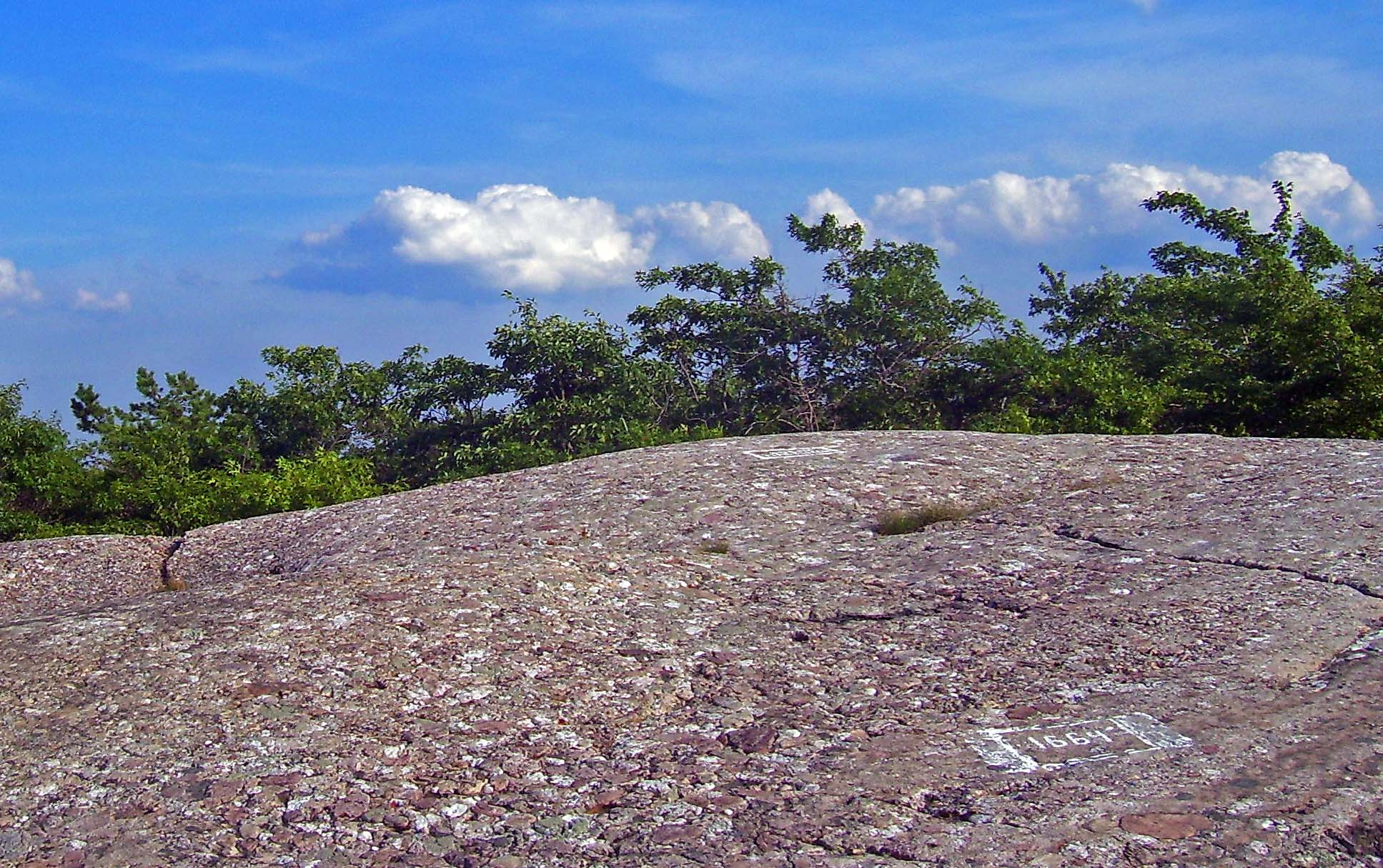
Summit, with elevation chalked on nearby rock.

On May 22, 2002, a group of hikers was bushwhacking on a boulder field on the southeastern side of the mountain, above Dark Hollow Brook, when a dislodged boulder killed a 76 year old man.

== Trails ==
The Long Path ascends the mountain by way of High Knob, and crosses Perry Creek. When it reaches the Jessup and Highland trails it joins them to Gonzaga Park. The Highlands Trail makes use of several trails on the mountain, ascending the eastern side of the mountain along the Sweet Clover Trail, and following the more southeasterly ridge and crossing the summit by way of the Jessup Trail, which continues along the crest to the southwestern tip of the mountain, ending in Gonzaga Park. The Dark Hollow, Barton Swamp, Trestle, Western Ridge, and Otterkill trails are also located on the mountain.
