= Kiryas Joel–Poughkeepsie–Newburgh metropolitan area =

Kiryas Joel–Poughkeepsie–Newburgh Metropolitan Statistical Area
- Metropolitan Statistical Area
- Kiryas Joel–Poughkeepsie–Newburgh, NY Metropolitan Statistical Area
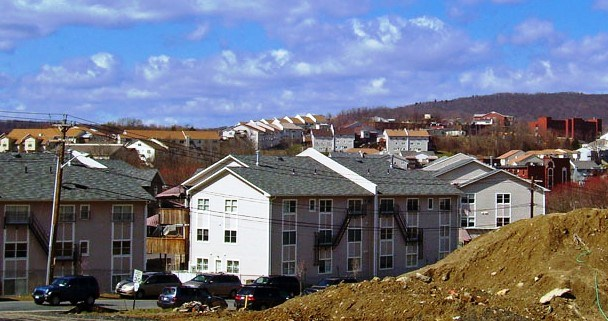
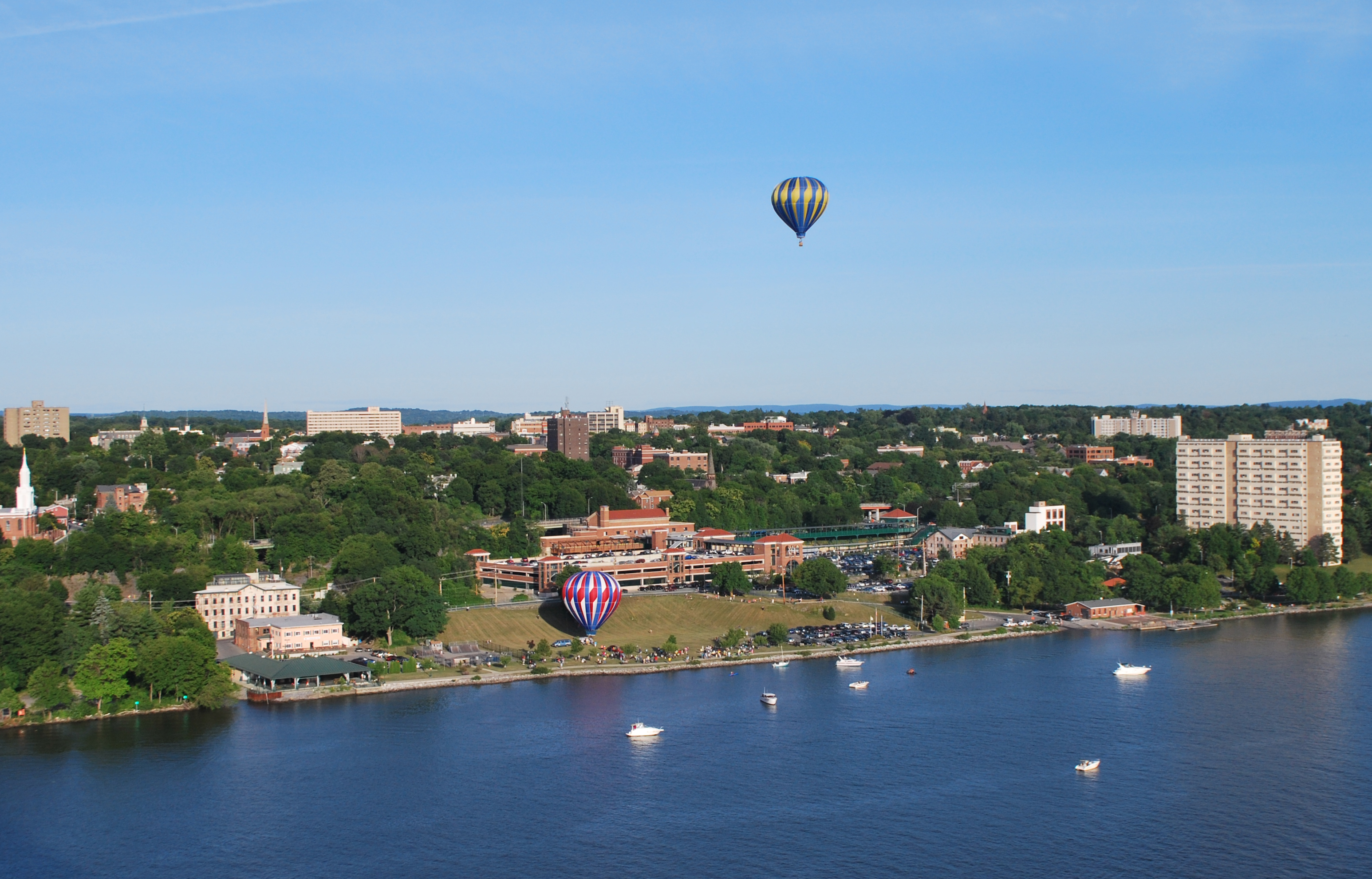
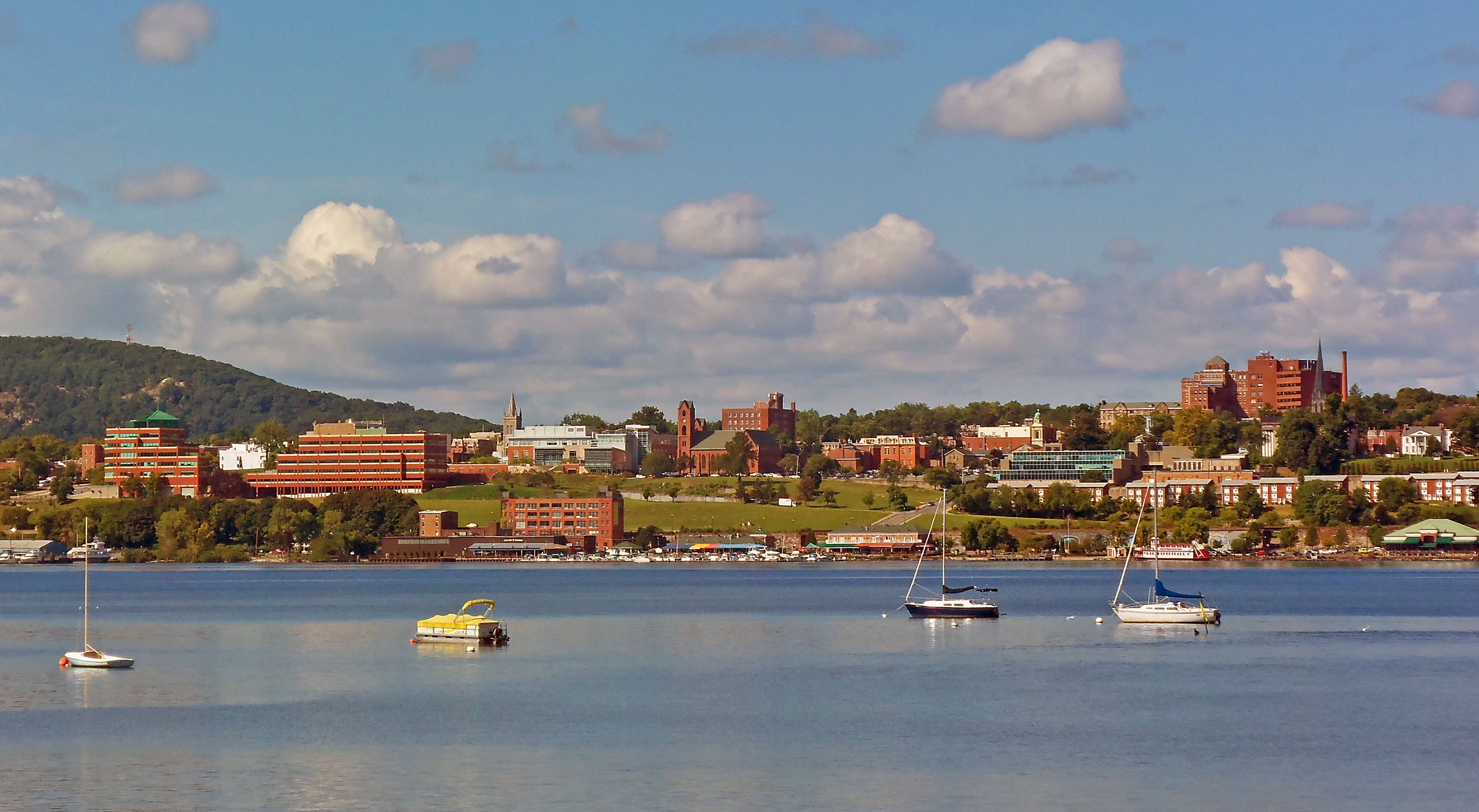
- From top to bottom: Kiryas Joel, Poughkeepsie, Newburgh
Map of Kiryas Joel–Poughkeepsie–Newburgh, NY MSA
Kiryas Joel–Poughkeepsie–Newburgh, NY MSA
Other Components of the New York City CSA
- Country: United States
- State: New York
- Largest city: Kiryas Joel
- Other cities: Beacon; Middletown; Newburgh; Port Jervis; Poughkeepsie

Area
  - Total: 1,664 sq mi (4,310 km^{2})
  - Land: 1,608 sq mi (4,160 km^{2})
  - Water: 57 sq mi (150 km^{2})

Population (2020)
  - Total: 679,221
  - Rank: 84th in the U.S.
  - Density: 422.4/sq mi (163.1/km^{2})

GDP
  - MSA: $42.862 billion (2022)
- Time zone: UTC-5 (EST)
  - Summer (DST): UTC-4 (EDT)
- Area codes: 518, 838, 845

The Kiryas Joel–Poughkeepsie–Newburgh, NY Metropolitan Statistical Area, as defined by the United States Office of Management and Budget, is an area consisting of two counties in New York's Hudson Valley, with the municipalities of Kiryas Joel, Poughkeepsie, and Newburgh as its principal cities. As of the 2020 census, the MSA had a population of 679,221. The area was centered on the urban area of Poughkeepsie–Newburgh. Prior to July 2023, it was known as the Poughkeepsie–Newburgh–Middletown, NY Metropolitan Statistical Area; whereupon it was renamed to its current name, to reflect population changes among its largest municipalities.

The Kiryas Joel–Poughkeepsie–Newburgh MSA is a component of the New York–Newark–Bridgeport, NY–NJ–CT–PA Combined Statistical Area, which had an estimated population of 23,582,649 as of the 2020 census.

In February 2013, the MSA was deleted, and the constituent counties became part of the New York–Newark–Jersey City, NY–NJ–PA Metropolitan Statistical Areas. During this time, the counties were split into two metropolitan divisions: Orange County was a part of the New York–Jersey City–White Plains, NY–NJ Metropolitan Division, while Dutchess County was in the Dutchess County–Putnam County, NY Metropolitan Division. The MSA was restored as a separate entity in September 2018.

== Counties ==
- Dutchess
- Orange

== Communities ==
=== Cities ===
- Beacon
- Middletown
- Newburgh (Principal city)
- Port Jervis
- Poughkeepsie (Principal city)

=== Towns ===
- Amenia
- Beekman
- Blooming Grove
- Chester
- Clinton
- Cornwall
- Crawford
- Deerpark
- Dover
- East Fishkill
- Fishkill
- Goshen
- Greenville
- Hamptonburgh
- Highlands
- Hyde Park
- LaGrange
- Milan
- Minisink
- Monroe
- Montgomery
- Mount Hope
- New Windsor
- Newburgh
- North East
- Palm Tree
- Pawling
- Pine Plains
- Pleasant Valley
- Poughkeepsie
- Red Hook
- Rhinebeck
- Stanford
- Tuxedo
- Union Vale
- Wallkill
- Wappinger
- Warwick
- Washington
- Wawayanda
- Woodbury

=== Villages ===
- Chester
- Cornwall-on-Hudson
- Fishkill
- Florida
- Goshen
- Greenwood Lake
- Harriman
- Highland Falls
- Kiryas Joel (Principal city)
- Maybrook
- Millbrook
- Millerton
- Monroe
- Montgomery
- Otisville
- Pawling
- Red Hook
- Rhinebeck
- South Blooming Grove
- Tivoli
- Tuxedo Park
- Unionville
- Walden
- Wappingers Falls
- Warwick
- Washingtonville
- Woodbury

=== Census-designated places ===
- Amenia
- Arlington
- Balmville
- Beaver Dam Lake
- Brinckerhoff
- Central Valley
- Crown Heights
- Dover Plains
- Fairview
- Firthcliffe
- Fort Montgomery
- Gardnertown
- Haviland
- Highland Mills
- Hillside Lake
- Hopewell Junction
- Mechanicstown
- Myers Corner
- New Windsor
- Orange Lake
- Pine Bush
- Pine Plains
- Pleasant Valley
- Red Oaks Mill
- Salisbury Mills
- Scotchtown
- Spackenkill
- Sparrow Bush
- Staatsburg
- Vails Gate
- West Point

=== Hamlets ===
- Amity
- Annandale-on-Hudson
- Arden
- Barrytown
- Bellvale
- Bullville
- Campbell Hall
- Chelsea
- Circleville
- Cuddebackville
- Howells
- Huguenot
- Linden Acres
- Little Britain
- Michigan Corners
- Mountain Lodge Park
- Mountainville
- New Hamburg
- New Hampton
- Pine Island
- Pleasant Plains
- Rhinecliff
- Salt Point
- Shekomeko
- Slate Hill
- Sugar Loaf
- Thompson Ridge
- Verbank
- Wassaic
- Westbrookville

== Demographics ==
Historical population
Census	Pop.	Note	%±
1990	567,109		—
2000	621,517		9.6%
2010	670,301		7.8%
2020	679,221		1.3%
2025 (est.)	718,377		5.8%

County	Seat	2025 estimate	2020 Census	Change	Area	Density
Orange	Goshen	417,669	401,310	+4.08%	840 sq mi (2,200 km^{2})	497/sq mi (192/km^{2})
Dutchess	Poughkeepsie	300,708	295,911	+1.62%	825 sq mi (2,140 km^{2})	364/sq mi (141/km^{2})
Total		718,377	697,221	+3.03%	1,665 sq mi (4,310 km^{2})	431/sq mi (167/km^{2})

=== 2010 Census ===
As of the census of 2010, there were 670,301 people, 233,890 households, and 164,352 families residing within the MSA. The racial makeup of the MSA was 78.50% White, 10.10% African American, 0.40% Native American, 2.90% Asian, 0.03% Pacific Islander, 5.20% from other races, and 2.90%% from two or more races. Hispanic or Latino of any race were 14.7% of the population.

=== 2000 Census ===
As of the census of 2000, there were 621,517 people, 214,324 households, and 153,660 families residing within the MSA. The racial makeup of the MSA was 83.68% White, 8.64% African American, 0.29% Native American, 1.96% Asian, 0.03% Pacific Islander, 3.31% from other races, and 2.07% from two or more races. Hispanic or Latino of any race were 9.30% of the population.

The median income for a household in the MSA was $52,572, and the median income for a family was $61,805. Males had a median income of $43,970 versus $30,764 for females. The per capita income for the MSA was $22,769.

== Colleges and universities ==
- Dutchess County
  - Adelphi University's Hudson Valley Center in the Town of Poughkeepsie
  - Bard College in Annandale-on-Hudson
  - Bard College at Simon's Rock in Barrytown
  - Culinary Institute of America's main campus in Hyde Park
  - Dutchess Community College in the Town of Poughkeepsie with a satellite campus in the town of Fishkill
  - Marist University in the Town of Poughkeepsie
  - Vassar College in the Town of Poughkeepsie
- Orange County
  - Fei Tian College in Middletown
  - Mount Saint Mary College in Newburgh
  - Orange County Community College with campuses in Middletown and Newburgh
  - Touro College of Osteopathic Medicine in Middletown
  - United States Military Academy in West Point

== Transportation ==
Major infrastructure includes:

- Stewart International Airport, which has scheduled flights on Allegiant Air.
- Amtrak, with a station at Poughkeepsie.
- Metro North's Hudson Line, a commuter rail line serving the eastern Hudson communities
- Metro North's Port Jervis Line, a commuter rail line serving Orange County and part of Rockland County
- Interstate 87, the eastern section of the New York State Thruway.
- Interstate 84, going from Pennsylvania to Massachusetts.
- Taconic State Parkway, going from Columbia County to Westchester County.
- Intercity bus companies serving Newburgh, and other cities along the Hudson River, ultimately having a destination in Albany or in New York City.
- Local buses in Dutchess and Orange counties.

== See also ==
- New York census statistical areas
