= List of crossings of Moodna Creek =

This is a list of crossings of Moodna Creek, in Orange County, New York, from its mouth at the Hudson River to its source at the confluence of Cromline Creek and Otter Kill west of Washingtonville.

Crossing	Carries	Location	Coordinates
	CSX Hudson River Subdivision	Cornwall	41°27′13″N 74°01′01″W
	US 9W	New Windsor	41°27′32″N 74°01′27″W
	Orange County 74 (Old Forge Hill Road)	New Windsor	41°27′25″N 74°02′25″W
	NY 32	Cornwall	41°25′59″N 74°03′17″W
	Pleasant Hill Road	Cornwall	41°24′33″N 74°04′26″W
	I-87 Toll / New York Thruway	Cornwall	41°24′33″N 74°04′40″W
	Otterkill Road	Cornwall	41°25′33″N 74°05′18″W
Moodna Viaduct	Metro-North Port Jervis Line; Norfolk Southern	Cornwall	41°25′45″N 74°05′57″W
		Blooming Grove	41°25′49″N 74°07′12″W
Abandoned railroad bridges		Blooming Grove	41°25′49″N 74°07′16″W
Abandoned railroad bridges		Blooming Grove	41°25′40″N 74°07′44″W
		Washingtonville	41°25′26″N 74°09′08″W
Abandoned railroad bridge		Washingtonville	41°25′31″N 74°09′36″W
	NY 208	Washingtonville	41°25′36″N 74°10′03″W
Abandoned railroad bridge		Washingtonville	41°25′27″N 74°10′12″W
	NY 94	Washingtonville/Blooming Grove	41°25′09″N 74°10′33″W
Abandoned railroad bridge		Blooming Grove	41°25′14″N 74°10′45″W
private bridge		Blooming Grove	41°25′51″N 74°11′18″W
