= Black Meadow Creek =

Stream in the U.S. state of New York

Coordinates: 41°21′4″N 74°17′40″W

Black Meadow Creek is a 9.7-mile-long (15.6 km) tributary of the Otter Kill in Orange County, New York, in the United States. Via the Otter Kill, it is part of the Moodna Creek watershed, flowing onward to the Hudson River, in one of New York State's most biodiverse natural areas. Home to 13 species of salamander as well as to New York's largest population of the Northern Cricket Frog (Acris c. crepitans), the state's only listed "Endangered" frog species, the creek area is considered by biologists to be one of the state's herpetological "hot spots". Black Meadow Creek has several confirmed bald eagle nests along its length.

Roughly 1/2 of the creek's length runs through a reservoir preserve owned by Orange County. This preserve status is credited with maintaining the upper creek's floodplain in its natural state for over one century.

Black Meadow Creek begins in the town of Warwick, near Glenmere Lake, and flows north into the town of Chester before converging with the Otter Kill in the village of Chester. Studies of the creek and its watershed are conducted by the nonprofit Sugar Loaf Historical Society and the nonprofit Glenmere Conservation Coalition, which maintain a small launch and study area on the creek.

The creek was named for the expansive, dark, forested swamp that settlers found along its floodplain, most of which was transformed into agricultural areas by the mid 19th century. Its floodplain hosts the Black Meadow Hunting Club, the Straub Farm and the Chester Industrial Park at its confluence with the Otter Kill.

== See also ==
- List of rivers of New York
