= Tomahawk Lake (New York) =

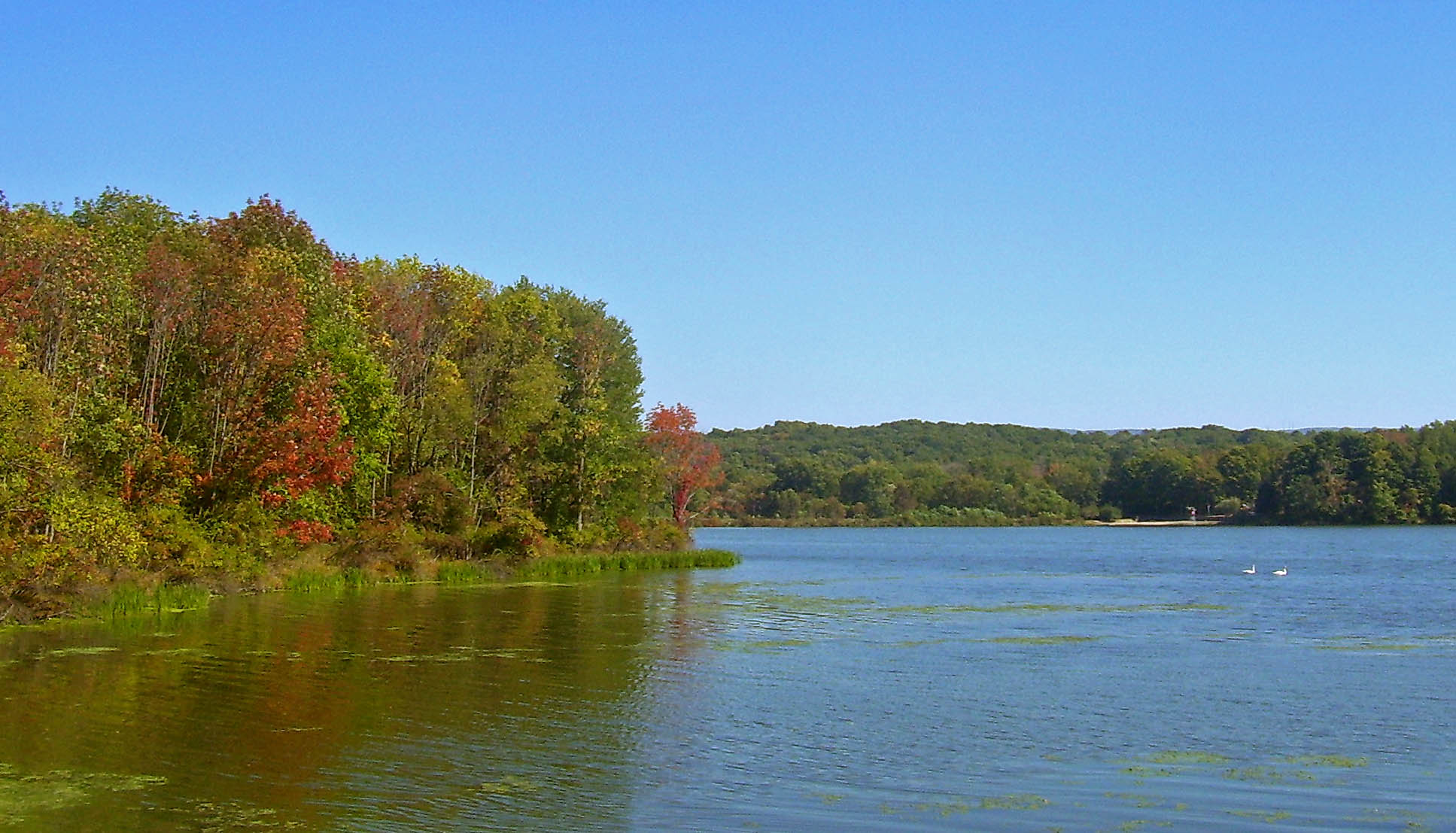
- View from the east at Hulsetown Road crossing

- Location within New York Location within the United States
- Location: Blooming Grove, New York
- Coordinates: 41°24′31″N 74°13′24″W
- Type: artificial
- Primary inflows: unnamed
- Primary outflows: Cromline Creek
- Basin countries: United States
- Surface area: 150 acres (61 ha)
- Surface elevation: 340 ft (100 m)

Tomahawk Lake is a lake located in the town of Blooming Grove, New York, United States. It is a reservoir, created in 1929 by damming Cromline Creek, which converges with Otter Kill elsewhere in the town to form Moodna Creek, a tributary of the Hudson River. It is privately owned, and regulated by the homeowners' association and access both as a water supply and recreational resource is restricted to its members. Two roads cross the lake, and public fishing access is limited to the lake up to 50 ft from the centerline of these roads. Limited parking is available on Hulsetown Road South of the junction with Cherry Hill Road. There is no bow-fishing in Tomahawk lake because it is illegal to discharge a bow from a NY road.

It is 150 acres (60 ha) in area. Recently a 30-acre (12 ha) section of the lake became infested with water chestnuts and had to be treated with herbicide. The state Department of Environmental Conservation found in 2006 that the dam had not been operated safely, lacked an emergency action plan and had been repaired in the past without a required construction permit.
