= Beaver Dam Lake, New York =

- Census-designated place
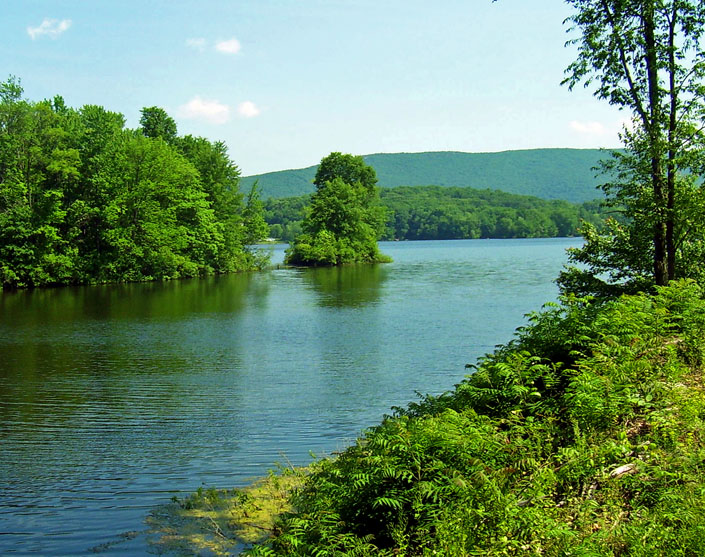
- Beaver Dam Lake, the lake the community is named after

- Location within New York Location within the United States
- Coordinates: 41°26′39″N 74°7′4″W
- Country: United States
- State: New York
- County: Orange
- Towns: Blooming Grove; Cornwall; New Windsor

Area
  - Total: 2.74 sq mi (7.10 km^{2})
  - Land: 2.44 sq mi (6.32 km^{2})
  - Water: 0.30 sq mi (0.78 km^{2}) 10.95%
- Elevation: 331 ft (101 m)

Population (2020)
  - Total: 2,609
  - Density: 1,069/sq mi (412.9/km^{2})
- Time zone: UTC-5 (Eastern (EST))
  - Summer (DST): UTC-4 (EDT)
- ZIP Codes: 12577 (Salisbury Mills); 12553 (New Windsor)
- Area code: 845
- FIPS code: 36-05188
- GNIS feature ID: 2652336

Beaver Dam Lake is a census-designated place (CDP) in the towns of New Windsor, Blooming Grove, and Cornwall in Orange County, New York, United States. As of the 2020 census, it had a population of 2,609.

The CDP is in eastern Orange County, bordered to the west by the village of Washingtonville and to the south by Salisbury Mills. The community surrounds Beaver Dam Lake, which drains south to Moodna Creek at Salisbury Mills. Moodna Creek flows into the Hudson River between New Windsor and Cornwall-on-Hudson.

New York State Route 94 forms the southern edge of the CDP. It leads northeast 6 miles (10 km) to New Windsor and southwest 10 miles (16 km) to Chester. Newburgh is 8 miles (13 km) to the northeast, and Middletown is 19 miles (31 km) to the west.

== Demographics ==
As of the census of 2023, there were 3,361 people residing in the area.

Historical population
Census	Pop.	Note	%±
2010	2,242		—
2020	2,609		16.4%
U.S. Decennial Census

=== 2020 census ===
As of the 2020 census, Beaver Dam Lake had a population of 2,609. The median age was 41.8 years. 22.3% of residents were under the age of 18 and 13.6% of residents were 65 years of age or older. For every 100 females there were 98.7 males, and for every 100 females age 18 and over there were 93.7 males age 18 and over.

91.6% of residents lived in urban areas, while 8.4% lived in rural areas.

There were 875 households in Beaver Dam Lake, of which 37.7% had children under the age of 18 living in them. Of all households, 62.7% were married-couple households, 13.7% were households with a male householder and no spouse or partner present, and 17.5% were households with a female householder and no spouse or partner present. About 14.2% of all households were made up of individuals and 7.0% had someone living alone who was 65 years of age or older.

There were 934 housing units, of which 6.3% were vacant. The homeowner vacancy rate was 1.1% and the rental vacancy rate was 2.0%.

Racial composition as of the 2020 census
Race	Number	Percent
White	1,934	74.1%
Black or African American	188	7.2%
American Indian and Alaska Native	8	0.3%
Asian	52	2.0%
Native Hawaiian and Other Pacific Islander	0	0.0%
Some other race	142	5.4%
Two or more races	285	10.9%
Hispanic or Latino (of any race)	470	18.0%

== Geography ==
According to the United States Census Bureau, the CDP has a total area of 2.74 square miles (7.1 km^{2}), of which 2.44 square miles (6.3 km^{2}) is land and 0.30 square miles (0.78 km^{2}) (10.95%) is water.

== Education ==
Most of it is in Washingtonville Central School District while a portion is in Cornwall Central School District.
