= Moodna Creek =

Tributary of the Hudson River in Orange County, New York

Moodna Creek Murderers' Creek Murderer's Creek
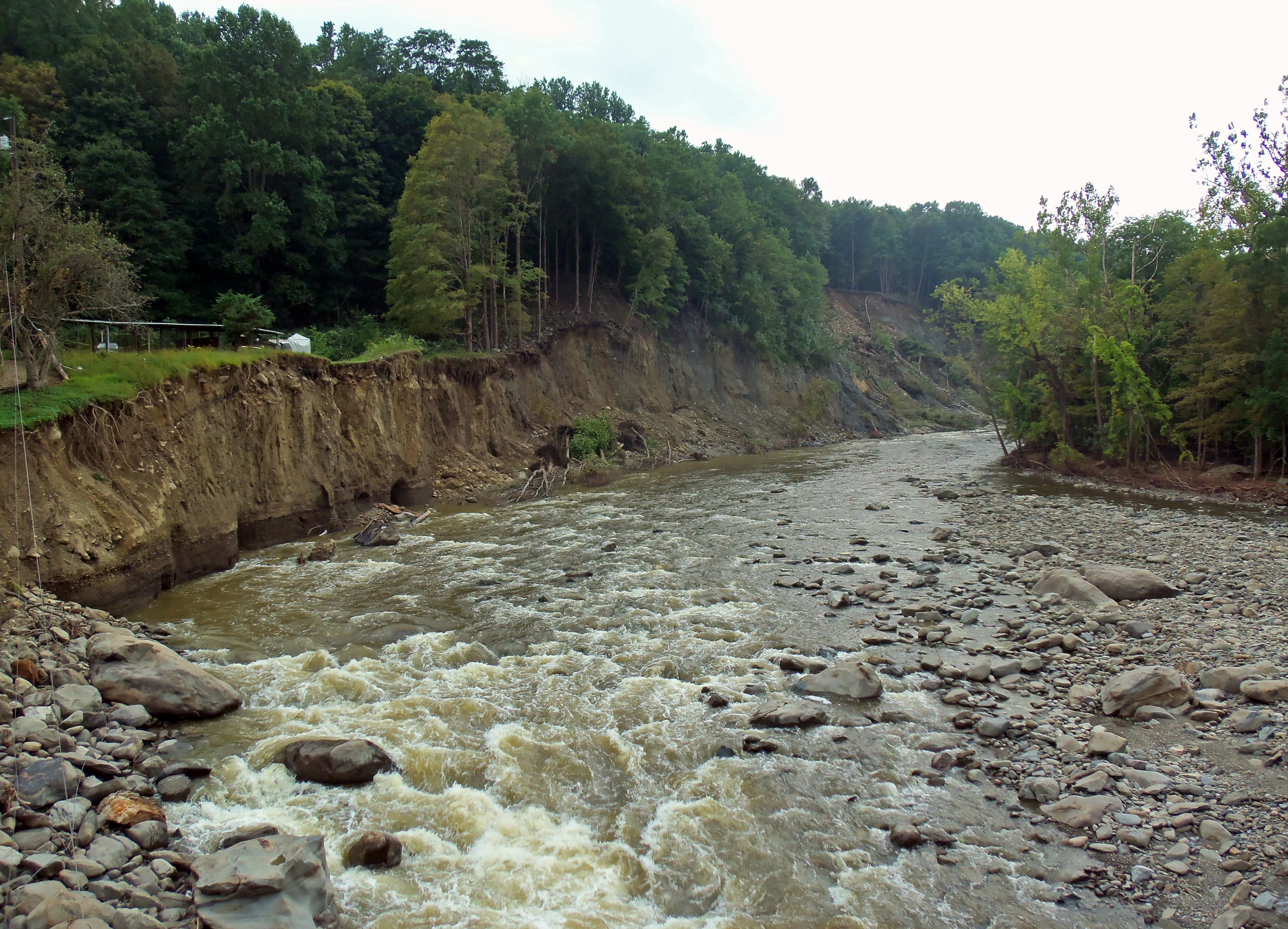
- Moodna Creek from Forge Hill Rd. Bridge in New Windsor, showing widening of channel resulting from floods after Hurricane Irene

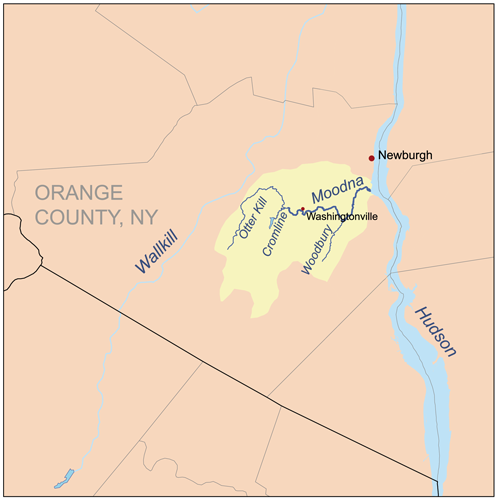
- Moodna Creek and its watershed and major tributaries
- Native name: Waoraneck (Munsee language)

Location
- Country: United States
- State: New York
- County: Orange
- Towns: Cornwall, New Windsor, Blooming Grove
- Villages: Washingtonville

Physical characteristics
- Source: Otter Kill
  - location: Goshen Reservoir No. 2, Town of Goshen
  - coordinates: 41°22′06″N 74°19′02″W
  - elevation: 460 ft (140 m)
- 2nd source: Cromline Creek
  - location: Tomahawk Lake, Blooming Grove
  - coordinates: 41°24′57″N 74°13′07″W
  - elevation: 340 ft (100 m)
- Source confluence
  - location: Blooming Grove, New York
  - coordinates: 41°25′51″N 74°11′41″W
  - elevation: 300 ft (91 m)
- Mouth: Hudson River
  - location: Cornwall
  - coordinates: 41°27′13″N 74°01′00″W
  - elevation: 0 ft (0 m)
- Length: 15.5 mi (24.9 km)
- Basin size: 187.2 sq mi (485 km^{2})

Basin features
- Tributaries
  - right: Woodbury Creek

Moodna Creek (Munsee: Waoraneck) is a small tributary of the Hudson River that drains eastern Orange County, New York. At 15.5 miles (25 km) in length from its source at the confluence of Cromline Creek and Otter Kill west of Washingtonville, it is the longest stream located entirely within the county.

Despite its small size relative to the Hudson, it has been a major influence on the topography of eastern central Orange County. Its 187.2-square-mile (485 km^{2}) watershed, including not only both its parent streams but Woodbury Creek as well, reaches as far inland as Warwick as well as 21 other area communities. Near Salisbury Mills it is crossed by the Moodna Viaduct, the longest actively used railroad trestle east of the Mississippi.

== Name ==
Before European contact, the creek was known as Waoraneck, which was also the name of a tribe in the area.

Most early records name the creek Murderer's Creek. One theory holds that "Moodna" is a corruption of the Dutch word moordenaars, meaning "murderers." Local lore has it that the name came from the massacre of the Stacys, an early family of settlers, along its banks. However, there is no evidence of any such murder actually having taken place.

Writer Nathaniel Parker Willis, while living in Cornwall, near the creek's mouth, in the mid-19th century, popularized the name "Moodna." He claimed that the "Murderers' Creek" name was a corruption of the name of a chief, likely Maringamus of the Waoraneck, who lived near its banks. By the dawn of the 20th century, "Moodna Creek" was commonly used on maps although the older name persisted.

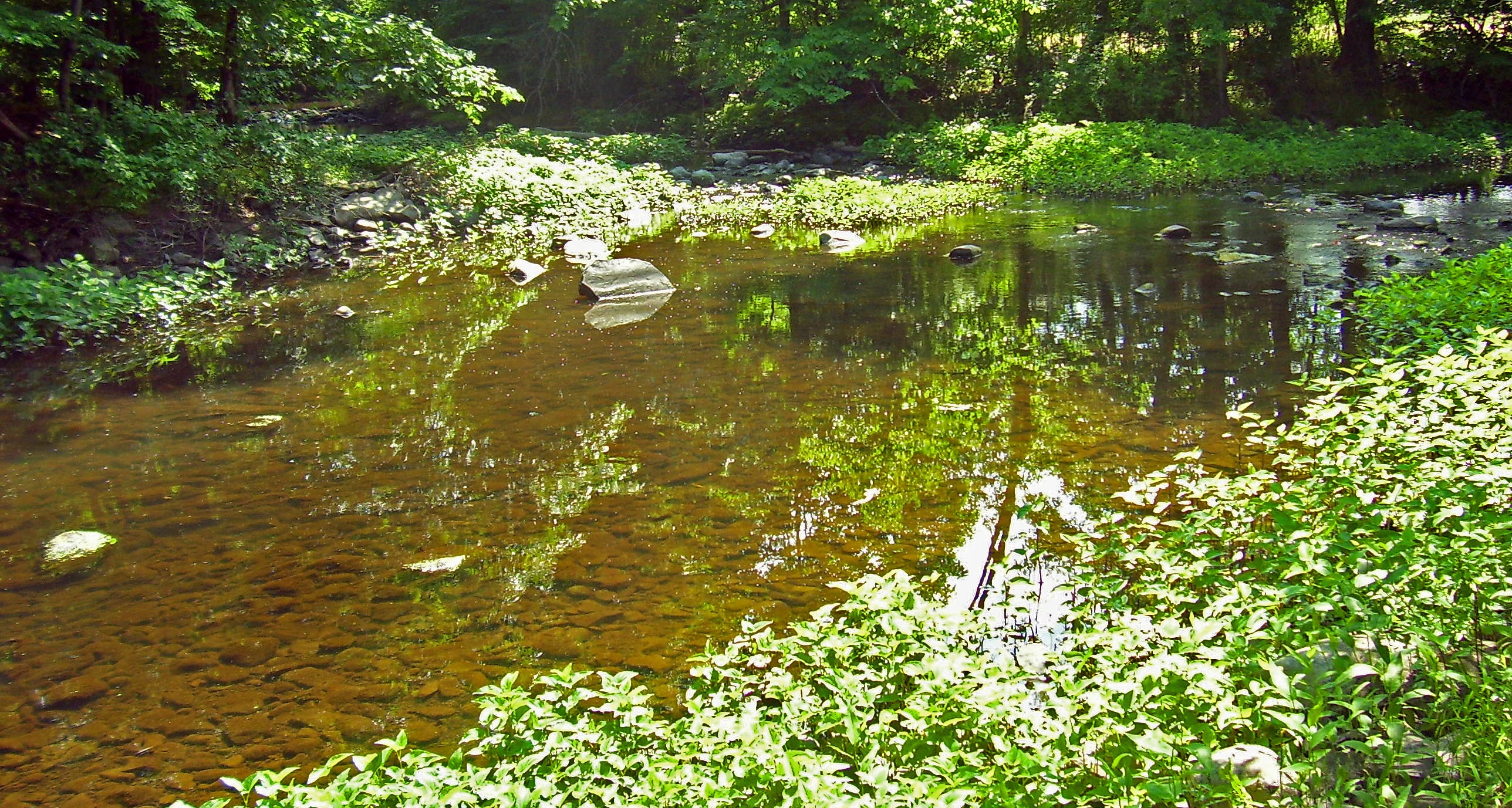
Confluence of Cromline Creek (center) and Otter Kill (right), creating Moodna Creek (left)

== Course ==
From the confluence, just off NY 208, the Moodna flows through woods and field alongside the highway for a short distance, then veers southwestward to where it crosses NY 94. The creek and Route 94 will keep close company for several miles as it turns eastward again into Washingtonville, where it crosses under 208 just south of downtown. Past the village, Route 94 and the creek enter first the Town of Blooming Grove and then Cornwall. They run close together at first, then further apart as the Moodna valley opens up just to the north of Schunemunk Mountain. At Salisbury Mills the viaduct crosses 193 feet (59 m) overhead.

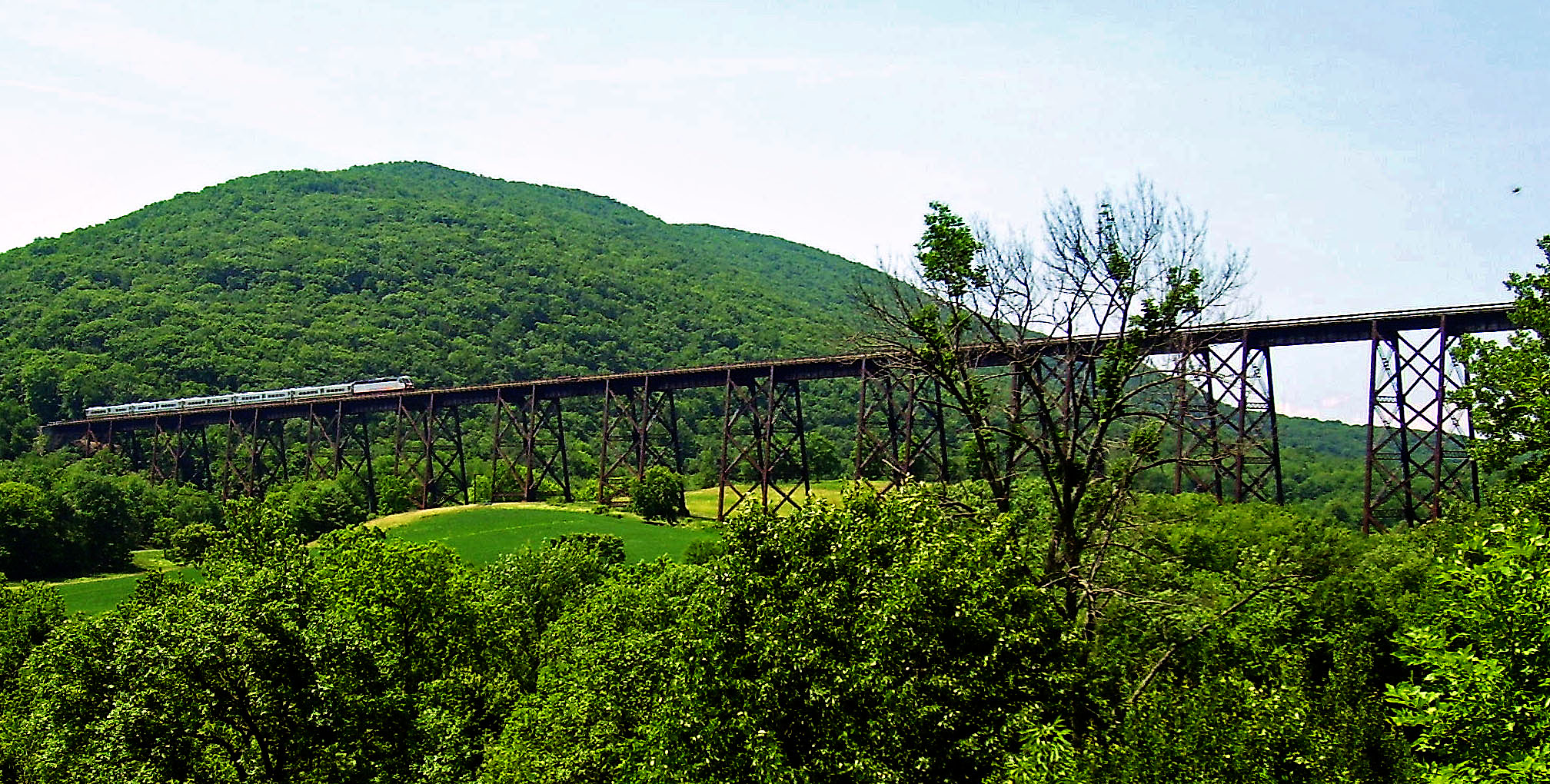
The Moodna Viaduct, location for a key scene in the 2007 film Michael Clayton.

After that point, the Moodna turns southward slightly, following the curve of Schunemunk's north end under the Thruway and leaving the Route 94 corridor. It descends into the narrower valley, forming the eastern boundary of Storm King Art Center. Here the already wide creek gets even wider with the addition of Woodbury Creek just after it tumbles over a small dam. Immediately afterwards NY 32 crosses between Vails Gate and Mountainville. The wide, rocky stream curves between steep, wooded hills to enter New Windsor and cross Old Forge Hill Road just below Knox's Headquarters State Historic Site, receiving its only major northern tributary, Silver Stream, in the process. Following Old Forge Hill briefly, it passes its last road crossing at US 9W, site of a small hamlet referred to once as Moodna Village and location of a small cottage once occupied by James and Ellen Gaffney, then bends southwards back into Cornwall to empty into the Hudson amid tidal marshes. The CSX Hudson River Subdivision freight line crosses right at its mouth.

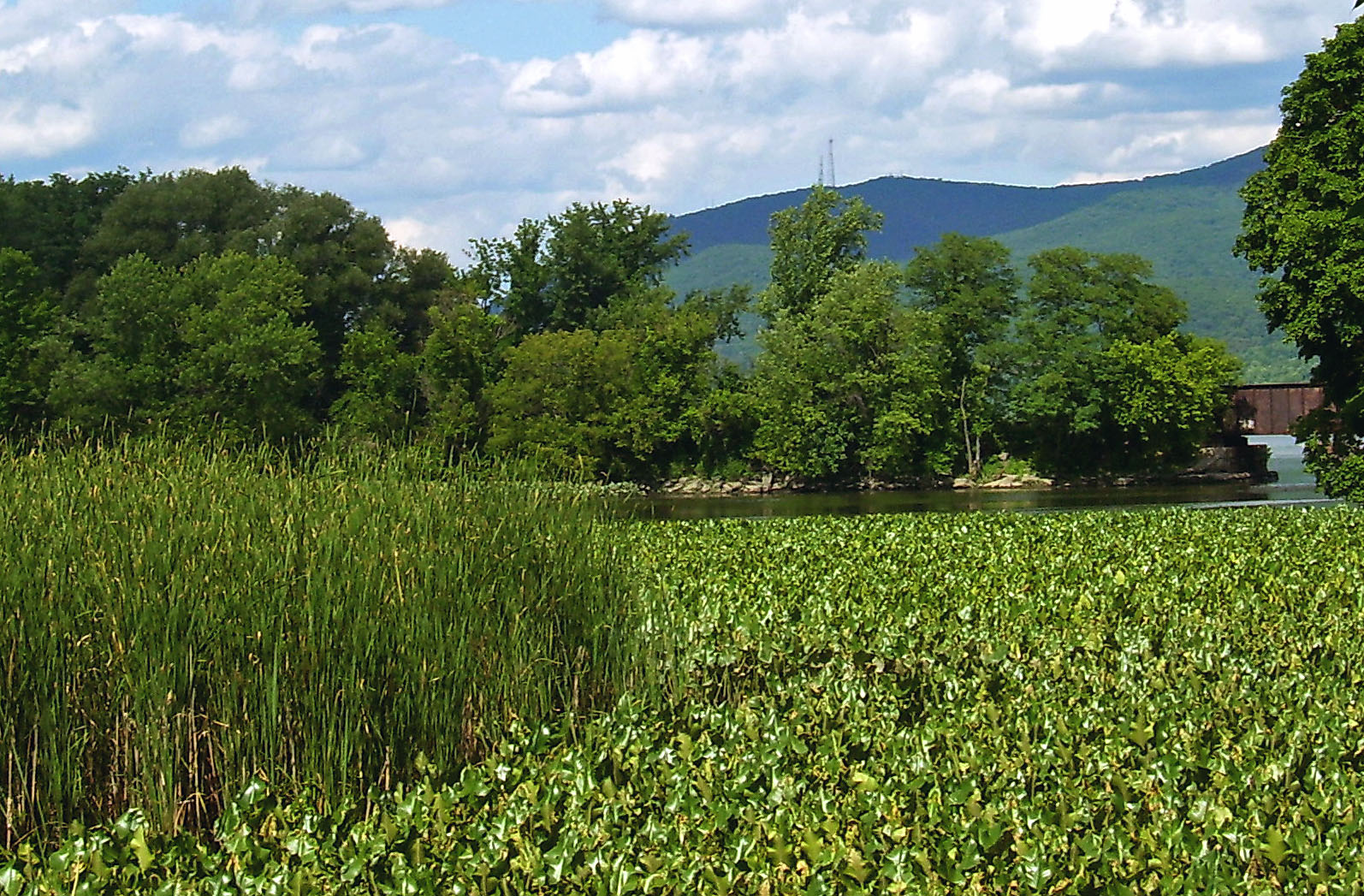
The tidal marshes at the creek's mouth, home to some rare species and communities.

== Natural history ==
The 75 acres (30 ha) of tidal marsh in the creek's estuary, between Route 9W and the Hudson, are home to several rare plants and natural communities. Anadromous fish species, such as striped bass, spawn there as well. This fish supply has been attractive not only to human anglers but to predatory bird species as well: bald eagles and ospreys have been seen feeding in the Moodna's marshes Bald Eagles have been confirmed nesting on the Black Meadow Creek.

Two herpetofaunal species listed by the NYS Department of Environmental Conservation occur along the Moodna. One, the Northern Cricket Frog (Acris c. crepitans) occurs along the length of the Black Meadow creek, which runs from Warwick, NY into Chester, NY. The Northern Cricket Frog, NY's only endangered frog species, occurs in its most numerous population along the Black Meadow creek, in the Orange-County-owned Glenmere Lake reservoir lands.

While the water quality in that area remains generally good, there is effluent from the Town of New Windsor's sewage treatment plant. In November 2003 the Riverkeeper environmental organization sued the town over discharge into the creek leaking from two manholes into the creek. It was settled in 2005 when the town agreed to repair the manholes, remediate the area and provide public access to the water.

== History ==
A group of 25 Scotch Presbyterian families became the first European settlers in what would become Orange County when they settled at the mouth of the Moodna in 1685.

The creek served as an important transportation route for soldiers during the American Revolutionary War.

During colonial times, and for a short time after independence, the creek formed part of the boundary between Orange and Ulster counties. In 1798, however, Rockland County was created, and the line was adjusted northward, giving Orange the current towns of Newburgh, Montgomery and Crawford as compensation for the lost territory.

In 1909, the Moodna Viaduct, under which the creek passes, opened. It is the longest and highest railroad trestle east of the Mississippi River as of December 2019 and is still in use.

In 1935, a Newburgh waitress named Dorothy Sherwood admitted to drowning her two-year-old son, Jimmy, in the Moodna. She was initially sentenced to death but, on appeal, was allowed to plead guilty to manslaughter and was sentenced to between six and fifteen years in prison. The case received national press attention.

By 1965, the Moodna was so heavily polluted that, according to Lee Mailler, he had seen the water run "green, pink, cream and blue" but that it usually looked "like curdled milk." A Mountainville resident told the Daily News that the smell from the Moodna was "so bad, so strong that it [could] awaken you from sleep." Joseph Martin and Douglas Sefton wrote in the News that the Moodna's pollution problem was emblematic of a nationwide pollution crisis. Although state officials acknowledged that a paper mill on the creek was largely responsible for the pollution, state and federal officials proved ineffective at remedying the situation for years due to bureaucratic entanglements. In 1970, the state gave the Town of New Windsor a $333,037 grant ($2.07 million in 2024) to build wastewater treatment facilities on the creek.

Heavy rains during the April 2007 Nor'easter caused the creek to flood extensively in its upper course in and around Washingtonville. Route 94 was blocked in both directions, and Route 208 from the south, leaving only northern access to the village available. Almost a hundred residents had to leave their homes for temporary shelter at a local elementary school.

Hurricane Irene caused the creek to swell, coming nearly to the platform of the 9W bridge, and washing out an area at the Forge Hill Road bridge. This caused the closing of part of Butternut Drive, and all of Forge Hill Road, except the easternmost 640 feet (200 m), from Route 9W to Staples Lane. The portion east of Staples Lane remains open to local traffic, until the east end of the bridge, which is unstable. One house on Butternut Lane has been condemned, and the property fenced off, due to the dangerous dropoff on the property. The road was not rebuilt and reopened until the late 2010s.

== Recreation ==
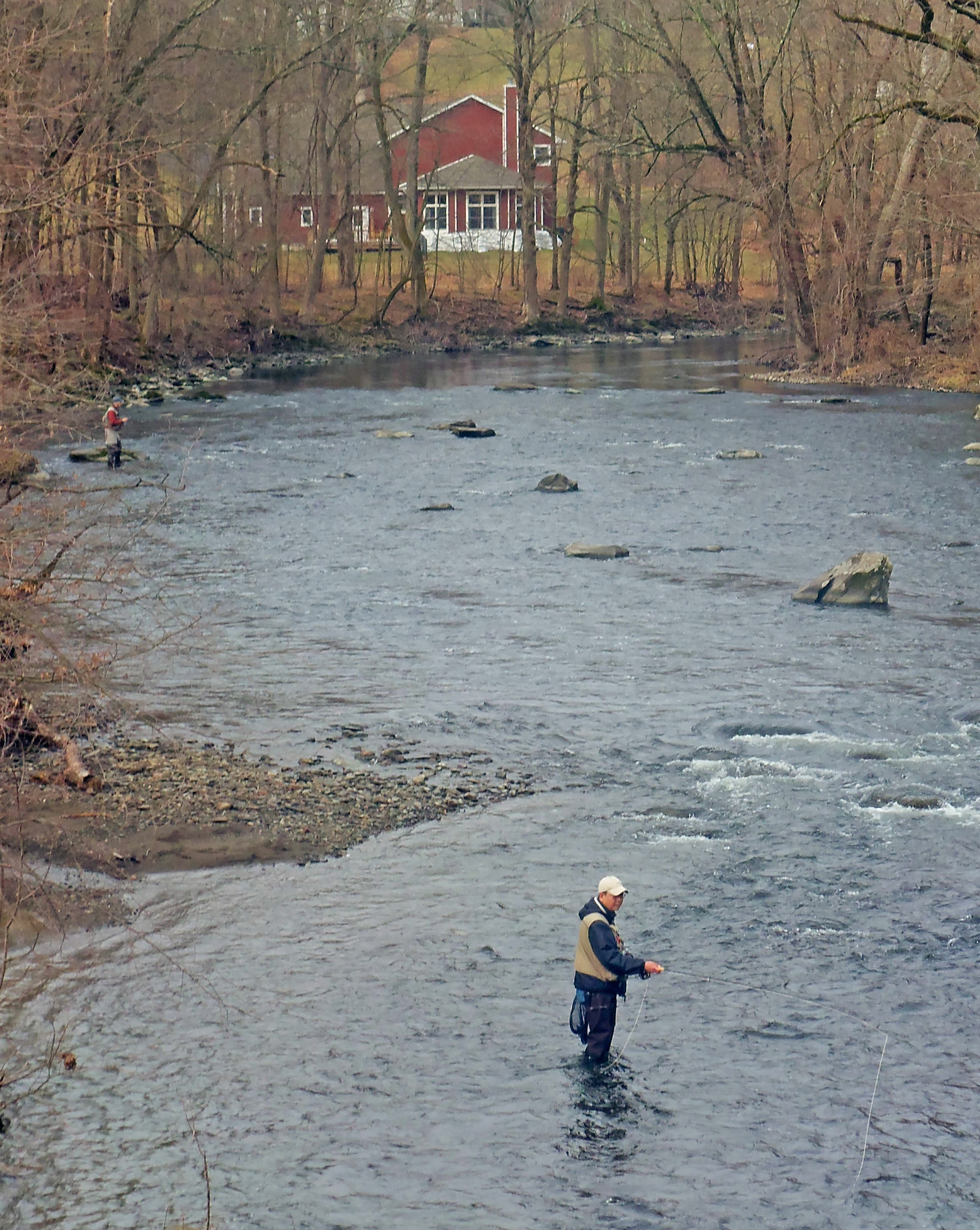
Anglers fly fishing for trout on the opening day of the 2013 season at the Woodbury Creek confluence

The six miles (10 km) between Woodbury Creek and Old Forge Hill Road in Cornwall have become a popular place for whitewater kayaking. Section ratings on the International Scale of River Difficulty range from Class II to Class IV. Anglers, too, have taken advantage of the stream above the salt marshes. The New York State Department of Environmental Conservation keeps Moodna Creek regularly stocked with brown and rainbow trout.

== Popular culture ==
In season three of Turn: Washington's Spies, the Moodna is the scene of a skirmish between Patriots and Loyalists, where Patriots try to the stop the excessive distribution of Continental Currency by the Loyalists designed to increase inflation in the United States and cause economic turmoil.

== Tributaries ==
- Silver Stream
- Woodbury Creek
- Baby Brook
- Perry Creek
- Satterly Creek
- Black Meadow Creek
- Otter Kill

== See also ==
- List of rivers of New York
- List of crossings of Moodna Creek
