= Mary Endico =

American watercolor artist

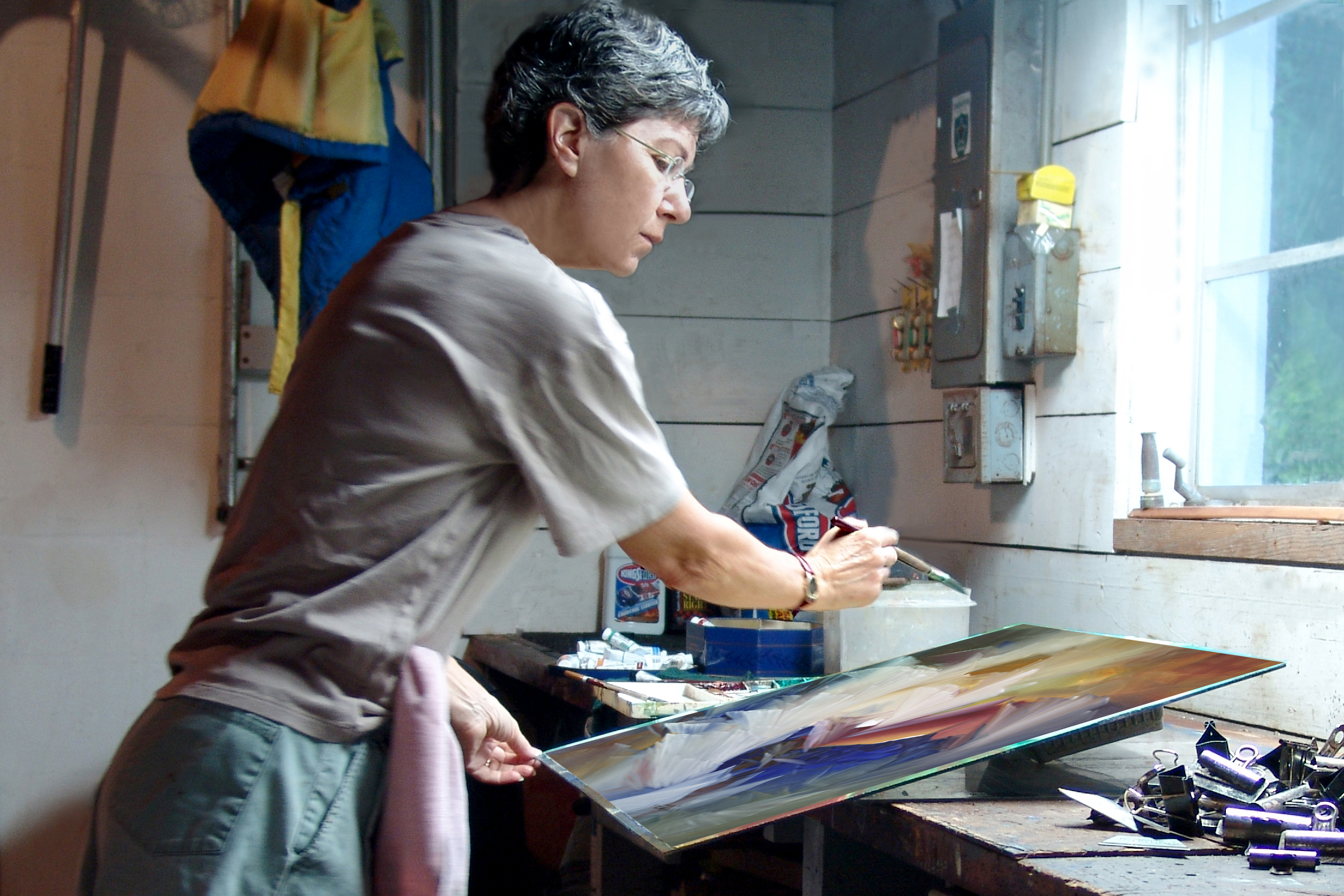
- Endico in 2007
- Born: Mary Antoinette Endico; June 13, 1954 (age 71); New Rochelle, New York, United States
- Education: Bachelor of Fine Arts 1976, Boston University also studied watercolor with Barbera Nechis and Edward A. Whitney
- Known for: Painting, drawing, photography
- Notable work: Red Ice Caverns; Red Kryptonite; Bleu Bird Nesting
- Movement: haute conduite
- Spouse: Bob Fugett (born 1950)

Mary Endico (/ˈmɛri ˈɛndɪˌkoʊ/; also known as Endico and Mary Endico Fugett; born June 13, 1954), is a full-time professional watercolor artist working in the Northeastern United States. Her studio is in Sugar Loaf, New York and has been open to the public since 1977.

== Career ==
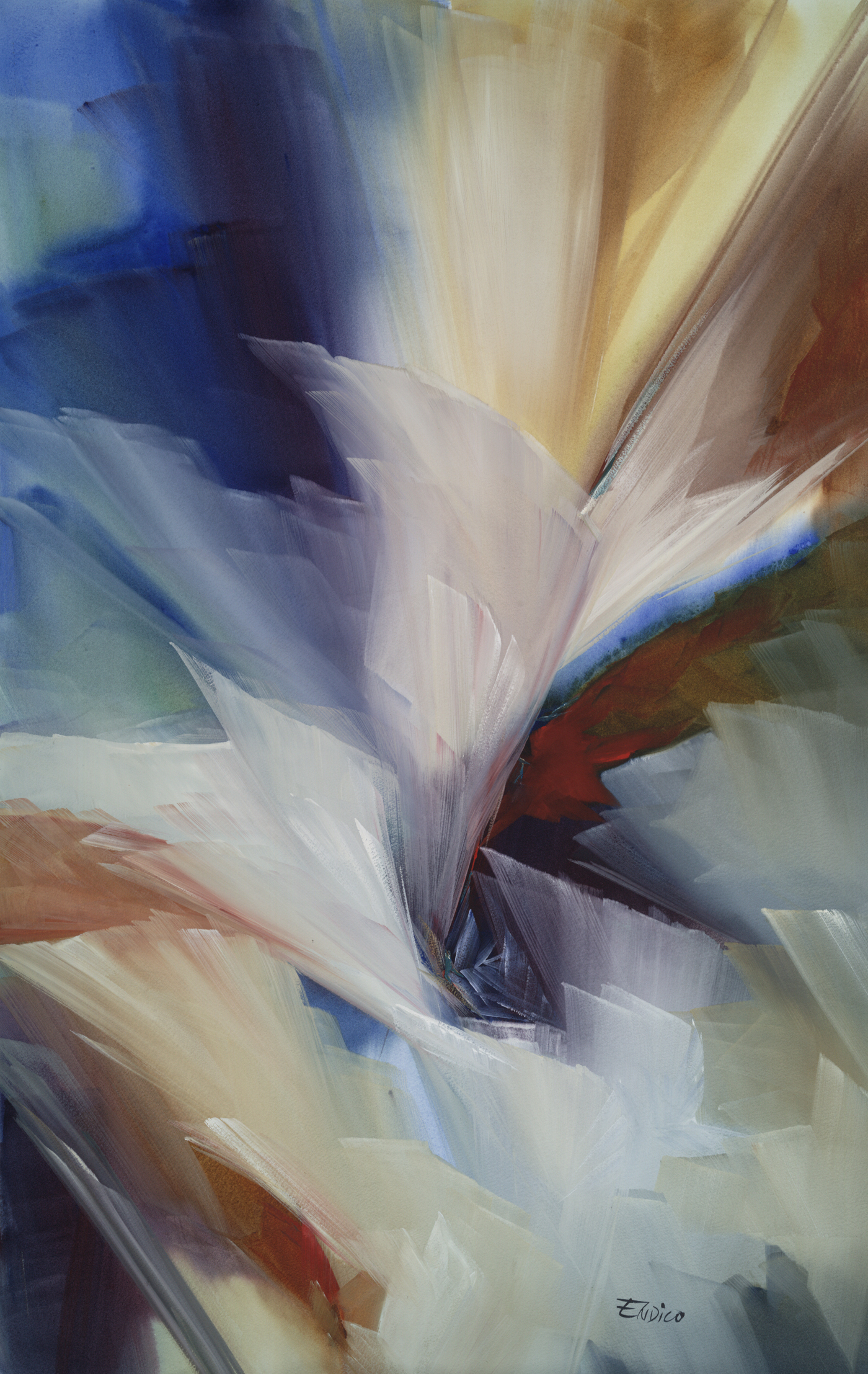
Example of Endico haute conduite watercolor

Endico watercolors are included in the permanent collections of the Asheville Art Museum, the Kentucky Museum, and the Chester, New York, Historical Society.

The earliest publication of her work was in 1969 at 15 years of age.

During her career she has produced and sold more than 20,000 original handpainted watercolors, almost exclusively sold from her own hand to visitors in her studio in Sugar Loaf, New York.

Mary Endico was previously elected to signature membership of Knickerbocker Artists and the Salmagundi Club in New York City. She is currently a signature member of the National Watercolor Society, the North East Watercolor Society, and the Kentucky Watercolor Society. Her work is exhibited nationally and internationally in juried museum and gallery competitions in which she has won numerous awards.

She has been a guest lecturer, juror, and watercolor demonstrator as well as an artist consultant for D'Arches fine art papers.

Mary Endico is a specialist in direct Wet-on-wet pure aqueous watercolor technique. Her work encompasses non-objective, abstract, cityscape, seascape, landscape, and floral, but she is most noted for the specific clarity and compositional aspects of her non-objective abstracts, which she terms haute conduite, a term which refers not only to the resulting watercolor paintings but also to the entire creative process used in their execution. Mary states that visitors to her studio often mistake her watercolors for acrylics.

In 1994 Mary purposely set aside looking at the work of others in order to develop the haute conduite style. At that time she had been working as a full-time professional watercolorist for 17 years and wanted to expand the medium by using the oil techniques she had studied as a Fine Art undergraduate student at Boston University, techniques such as scumbling, dragging, and rubbing.

She set aside looking at the work of others in order to avoid diluting her process.

Endico watercolors are found in public and private collections throughout the U.S. and in 21 other countries.
