= Killing of Ramona Moore =

Homicide in New York

- An image of Moore distributed by police and prosecutors seeking her whereabouts after her disappearance in 2012
- Location: 41.36894°N 74.18714°W
- Missing: July 31, 2012
- Arrests: Nasean Bonie
- Convicted: Bonie
- Charges: Second-degree murder
- Verdict: Guilty
- Convictions: Manslaughter

On April 21, 2015, the remains of a woman found in South Blooming Grove, New York, were identified as those of Ramona Moore. The 35-year-old woman had last been seen on July 31, 2012, re-entering her apartment in a house near Crotona Park in the Bronx, New York City. In 2014, New York City police had charged her building superintendent, Nasean Bonie, with her murder although there was no body.

Bonie had been suspected of killing Moore from the beginning of the investigation into her disappearance. Her friends said that Moore had been having a dispute with him over her rent payments. On the night she was last seen, circumstantial evidence suggests he might have been disposing of a body. After a 2013 police search of the basement of Moore's apartment, Bonie filed a lawsuit alleging that the police stole money from him. He has since claimed he was charged with Moore's murder in retaliation.

In 2014 Bonie was arrested in Pennsylvania by federal marshals. At the time, he reportedly claimed that the absence of a body precluded any murder charges against him. His trial, which would have been the first murder trial in the history of Bronx County without the decedent's body in evidence, was scheduled to begin in April 2015, days after Moore's body was found. Bonie's trial was postponed while medical examiners determined Moore's cause of death. At the time Moore disappeared, Bonie was facing assault charges for an attack on his wife that left her seriously injured. Shortly after Moore's body was discovered, Bonie was convicted and sentenced to four years in prison for the attack on his wife.

The defense obtained city records showing that Moore was up to date in her rent payments. Prosecutors clarified that the dispute was not about the rent but rather a scheme by Bonie to increase those payments by coercing Moore to file false documentation that would have boosted her Section 8 subsidies. To bolster this theory, in late 2015 they subpoenaed the unedited footage from an interview Bonie gave to a local cable channel that had closely covered the case. The cable channel has vigorously opposed giving up the footage to the police. It is appealing the judge's decision requiring them to let him review footage and release relevant portions to the police. A month-long trial in July 2016 ended with the jury acquitting Bonie of murder charges but convicting him of the lesser included charge of manslaughter.

== Background ==
In the spring of 2012, the 35-year-old Moore, a Guyanese American, was living on Jefferson Place in the Bronx neighborhood of Claremont, two blocks south of Crotona Park. She lived in one of a row of attached single-family houses that qualified as Section 8 affordable housing. She rented the house from a couple, Krystal Campbell and Nasean Bonie. Although Campbell owned the houses, she delegated management responsibilities to her husband, the building superintendent.

Both Moore and Bonie had been having legal difficulties at the time. Three of Moore's four children, who lived with her, had been removed from the house earlier in the year and placed in foster care by the city's Administration for Children's Services (ACS). They had investigated and confirmed reports that the children had been neglected, missing school and staying at home by themselves during some of Moore's frequent absences. Moore did not have a job but was hoping to have at least her eldest child, her daughter Rashina, move back in later in the summer after the mother completed court-mandated required programs.

On July 12 of that year, Bonie beat his wife with a tray table, his belt and his fists, resulting in a fractured skull. He was arrested and charged with second-degree assault against Campbell, a felony. At the time, Moore told a neighbor that Bonie had been trying to extort money from her under the guise of rent.

== Disappearance ==
Moore was outside her house talking with the neighbor to whom she had already complained about Bonie's extortion efforts on the evening of July 31, 2012. She had called 9-1-1 about Bonie twice that day. She had been eating a mango, and offered the neighbor one. After the neighbor accepted, Moore returned to her house to get the fruit. She never came out with the mango, and was never again seen alive by anyone who has publicly discussed witnessing these events, such as the neighbor in question.

Moore was reported missing several days later, after her absence had continued longer than was typical of her. The neighbor later told police that shortly after Moore had re-entered the house, she had heard her arguing with Bonie, and that after a loud bang the argument had ended.

== Investigation ==
New York City police detectives began their search by looking at Moore's apartment. Her departure seemed to have been abrupt and unplanned. Her cat had not been fed, nor any arrangements made for it. Prescription medication for the lupus she suffered from was left behind, and Moore had not gotten any more pills from the pharmacy. Despite the shortcomings that ACS found in her treatment of her children, Moore had never missed family events such as birthdays of her children.

Bonie confirmed to police that he had an ongoing dispute with Moore over her rent. He said she had been a problematic tenant. "She seems to have a drug problem and she lets different men into her apartment at all hours of the night," he told detectives. Soon after her disappearance, he threw out her remaining belongings and rented the house to a new tenant.

The police investigation led to a series of tips from other neighbors on the street. One detective described them as "watchers" like the character played by Jimmy Stewart in the Alfred Hitchcock film Rear Window. They described a series of actions by Bonie. One neighbor recalled that shortly after Moore's neighbor told of last seeing her, he had seen Bonie leave the house carrying a large garbage container, and put it in a vehicle. Another saw him return in that same vehicle later that night. Police began to consider the case a murder investigation, although it was still officially a missing-persons case.

A search of records related to Bonie's cell phone found a series of pings that night, as well as some calls from towers in Orange and Rockland counties, northwest of the city on the other side of the Hudson River. Bonie has relatives living there. One detective, Malcolm Reiman, worked with a ballistics expert to narrow a search area based on Bonie's known departure and arrival times at his house and an estimated rate of road travel speed. Within that area, they searched road embankments, primarily in Harriman State Park, a large wooded protected area that straddles the border between the two counties, but did not find Moore's body.

Eventually, the investigation developed enough evidence for police to get a search warrant for the basement under the apartment occupied by Moore. They executed it in April 2013. The basement floor was covered in raw sewage. A dog was loose in the area which the officers had to subdue with a tranquilizer dart before they could search the premises. In a toilet they found half a bag of charcoal, which they believed had intentionally been flushed to cause the backup from the sewers and destroy trace evidence. "The feces might have rendered some forensic evidence irretrievable," Reiman later told The New York Times.

A camera crew from News 12, a cable news channel in the New York metropolitan area, accompanied the police to film the search operation for its broadcast. Bonie, who had not been present when officers arrived, was livid when he returned and found the search in progress. He claimed the police were harassing him, since he had already spoken to them and allowed them to search Moore's apartment several times. Later, he accused the police of stealing $40,000 in cash from the basement during the search, an allegation the department denied. A suit he filed over the allegedly missing money is pending.

== Arrest ==
Police did not say whether the search of the basement had turned up anything significant. But almost a year later, in May 2014, Bronx County prosecutors presented the evidence against Bonie to a grand jury, which indicted him on charges of second-degree murder and first-degree manslaughter. An arrest warrant was issued for Bonie. The New York Post reported that an acquaintance had told police that Bonie had admitted to him that he had something to do with Moore's disappearance.

By this time, Bonie had left New York and moved to Mechanicsburg, Pennsylvania. He was taken into custody by federal marshals. "I watch 48 on television," he told them, upon being informed that he was being arrested and charged with murdering Moore. "You can't charge me with murder without a body." Back in the Bronx, a Supreme Court justice ordered Bonie held without bail.

Since the early 19th century, American courts have tried over 400 murders in which the victim's body had not been found; Bonie's case would have been the first in the Bronx. "It's like running a 100-meter race when the criminal gets to start at the 20-meter mark," a former federal prosecutor told the Times. "When you don't have a body, you don't have the best evidence in the crime." However, prosecutors in Manhattan had gained convictions for con artists Sante and Kenny Kimes in the 1998 murder of their landlady, Irene Silverman without her body having been found. The prosecutor allowed conviction of Bonie was possible if other aspects of the case were strong.

Late in 2014, News 12 aired an interview with Bonie, who had been held in jail since his arrest. He denied any involvement in Moore's disappearance or death, saying that she had been a good tenant who had paid her rent on time. If he had killed her, he asked, why would he have cooperated with the police investigation as much as he had, to the point of allowing officers to search his home without obtaining a search warrant? He said they had only considered him as a suspect after he filed suit for their allegedly taking money from the basement.

== Discovery of body ==
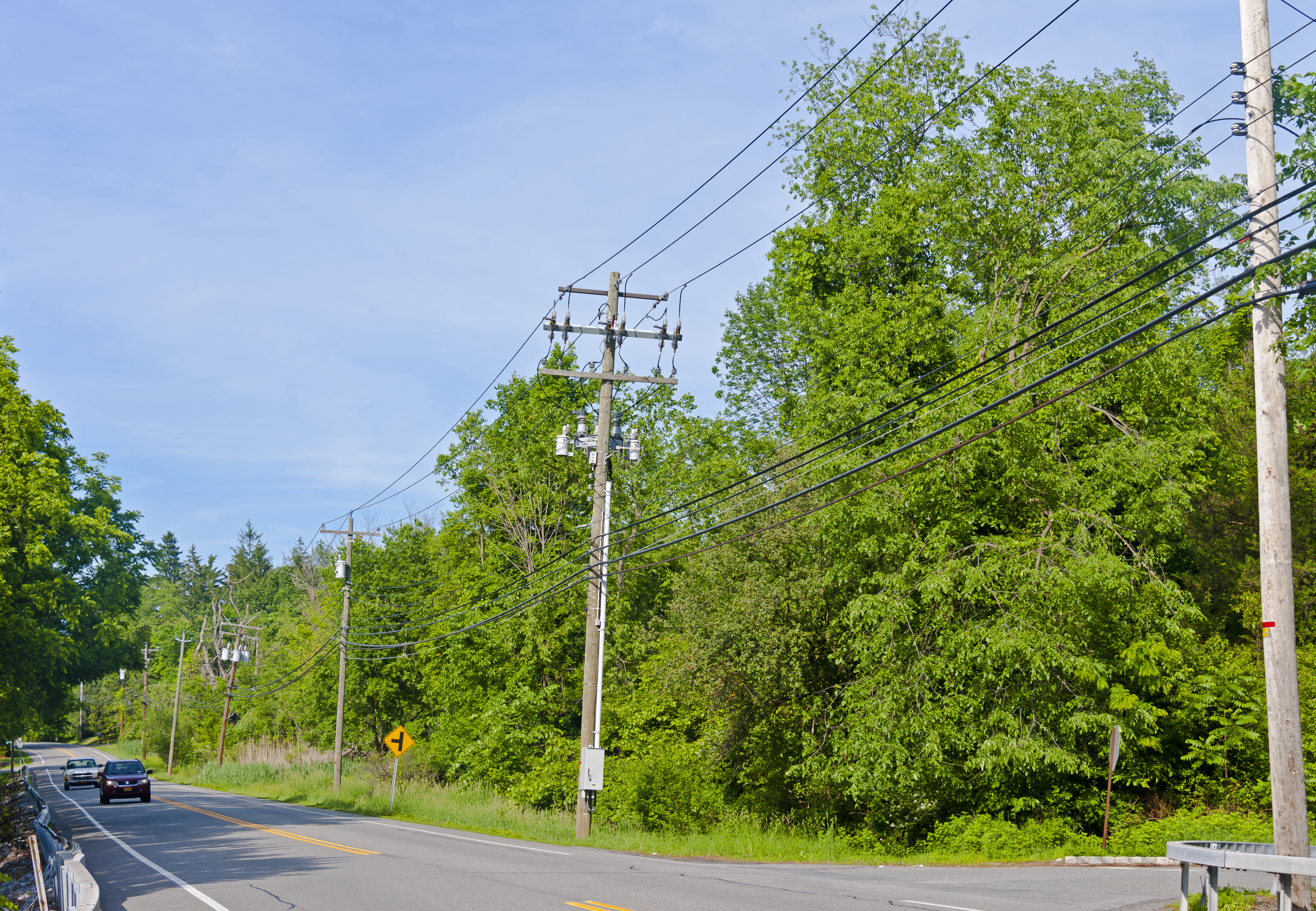
Intersection where Moore's body was discovered

In April 2015, utility workers for Central Hudson Gas & Electric were clearing trees away from power lines along New York State Route 208 in South Blooming Grove, a small village in Orange County west of the Hudson River. At the wooded, undeveloped intersection with Captain Carpenter Road just north of the village's center, they came upon the skeletal remains of a human body about 30 feet (9.1 m) from the road. They called New York State Police. The remains were taken to the local medical examiner so that an autopsy could be performed.

Four days later dental records matched the bones to Moore. Bonie was known to have a friend near where the remains were found. It was not known at that time whether Moore had been killed in the Bronx or Orange County. He pleaded not guilty to the murder charges, denying any involvement in Moore's death.

== Trial ==
Pretrial motions in Bonie's case were to have started the week following the body's discovery. Instead, the trial was continued so that a forensic anthropologist for the city could examine the bones to establish the cause of death. Police believe that Bonie strangled Moore but, without her body, could not be sure. The report was expected to be completed by June.

The day after the body was identified as Moore, Bonie appeared in court to face the pending assault case against his wife. He pleaded guilty to assault and was sentenced to four years in prison, to be followed by three years of post-release supervision. Judge Ralph Fabrizio called his crime "a multi-weapon attack on a woman."

In September 2015 prosecutors issued a subpoena duces tecum to News 12, requesting that it turn over to them all the footage of reporter Ray Raimundi's jailhouse interview with Bonie. In response, News 12 wrote to Fabrizio saying that they would provide a copy of the broadcast interview, but not the unaired portions, citing state shield laws. The prosecution moved to have News 12 held in contempt of court, upon which the channel formally moved to quash the subpoena at the end of October.

At the ensuing hearing on the subpoena and the motion to quash, News 12 argued that there was nothing in the unedited hearing that the state either did not know or was relevant to its case against Bonie. The prosecutors responded that they sought to determine if there was additional evidence to support their theory of Bonie's alleged financial motive to murder Moore.

Around the time Moore's body was discovered, the defense had obtained records from the city's Housing Authority showing that Moore had paid all her rent on time, and casting doubt on the prosecution's theory of Bonie's motive as a rent dispute. The prosecution, which had attached to the indictment a report from a detective who spoke with Bonie three days after Moore's disappearance quoting Bonie as saying that she owed him rent and he was planning to have her evicted, said that their theory was not that she had failed to pay her rent, but that Bonie had been pressuring her to file false Section 8 paperwork so he could collect additional rent. They wanted to see if he had made any statements during the interview that either confirmed that theory or contradicted his earlier statements.

Fabrizio ruled for the state that News 12 had to turn over the complete, unedited interview. While News 12 had argued that the state had failed to demonstrate any basis for supposing that Bonie had confessed to the crime off camera, the judge said that the prosecution sought to learn whether he had made admissions relevant to the case. Raimundi's narration described Bonie making positive statements about his relationship with Moore. Even the defense agreed the issue of the Section 8 applications was a central and relevant one in the case. The judge did not find that Bonie had been promised confidentiality by News 12, and there was no possible other way for the state to find out what he might have said that was not broadcast. The judge's one concession to News 12 was that he would review the recorded interview in camera and release to the prosecution only those sections that discussed Bonie and Moore's landlord-tenant relationship and/or the Section 8 issue.

The decision was stayed pending appeal, a step News 12 said it would take. "This is the classic case of overreach by a prosecutor who is attempting to use the work product of a reporter as an investigative tool for his criminal prosecution," said David Schulz, an attorney for the channel. "This is precisely what the shield law prohibits."

In July 2016 Bonie's trial took place. The prosecution presented 20 witnesses over the month. At the end, the jury acquitted Bonie of murder but convicted him of manslaughter.

The next month, Bonie was sentenced to the maximum, 25-years to life in prison. Bonie maintained his innocence as he read from a prepared statement before the sentencing. "My life, I believe, has been taken by the NYPD," he told the court. "This is 2016 and black men are now target practice for police," he said. "The Bronx District Attorney's office is no better ... They are out to cover their tracks of lies, deceit and prejudice." Moore's sister, in response, called him a "menace to society ... [who] should never be able to see the light of day again." He was returned to Attica Correctional Facility, where he had been serving his assault sentence.

== See also ==
- Crime in New York City
- List of solved missing person cases (2010s)
