= Glenmere Lake =

Lake in New York, United States

- Glenmere, October 2008

- Location within New York Location within the United States
- Location: Orange County, New York
- Coordinates: 41°20′09″N 74°19′48″W
- Basin countries: United States
- Surface area: 337 acres (136 ha)
- Surface elevation: 531 ft (162 m)
- References: USGS

Glenmere Lake is a colonial mill pond or reservoir located in Orange County, New York, United States. It is New York State's largest habitat of the Northern cricket frog (Acris crepitans), listed as endangered by in New York State Department of Environmental Conservation records

The lake is part of the greater Orange County-owned Glenmere Preserve, one of the largest wild areas in Orange County. Glenmere Lake is the most biologically diverse natural feature of Orange County, with hardwood swamp, shale ridgelines, wide marsh, mossy bogs, vernal pools and an open-water reservoir. Such biodiversity, present in New York's fastest-growing county, underscores the critical nature of Glenmere's unique habitat. The Glenmere Reservoir lands are home to bald eagles, six species of hawk and six of owl. Endangered plant and animal species inhabit the Glenmere lands- in fact, New York State's largest and virtually last population of endangered northern cricket frogs inhabits the entire parcel.

Glenmere straddles Orange County's two largest Hudson River watershed basins: The Wallkill, on its western side, and the Moodna, on its east, as represented by its westernmost tributary, the Black Meadow Creek) The Glenmere Reservoir lands include a "watershed ambiguous zone" where small brooks split off into either watershed. The lake and associated county lands comprise sections of the towns and villages of Warwick, Chester, Sugar Loaf and Florida.

The 1912 Glenmere mansion still overlooks the reservoir.

Studies of the lake and its associated periphery are performed by the educational non-profit Glenmere Conservation Coalition.

After a number of years of warnings associated with the condition of and repairs to the Glenmere Lake dam, a penalty of $350,000 was assessed against the town of Chester and village of Florida by state regulators.
