= Salisbury Mills, New York =

- Census-designated place
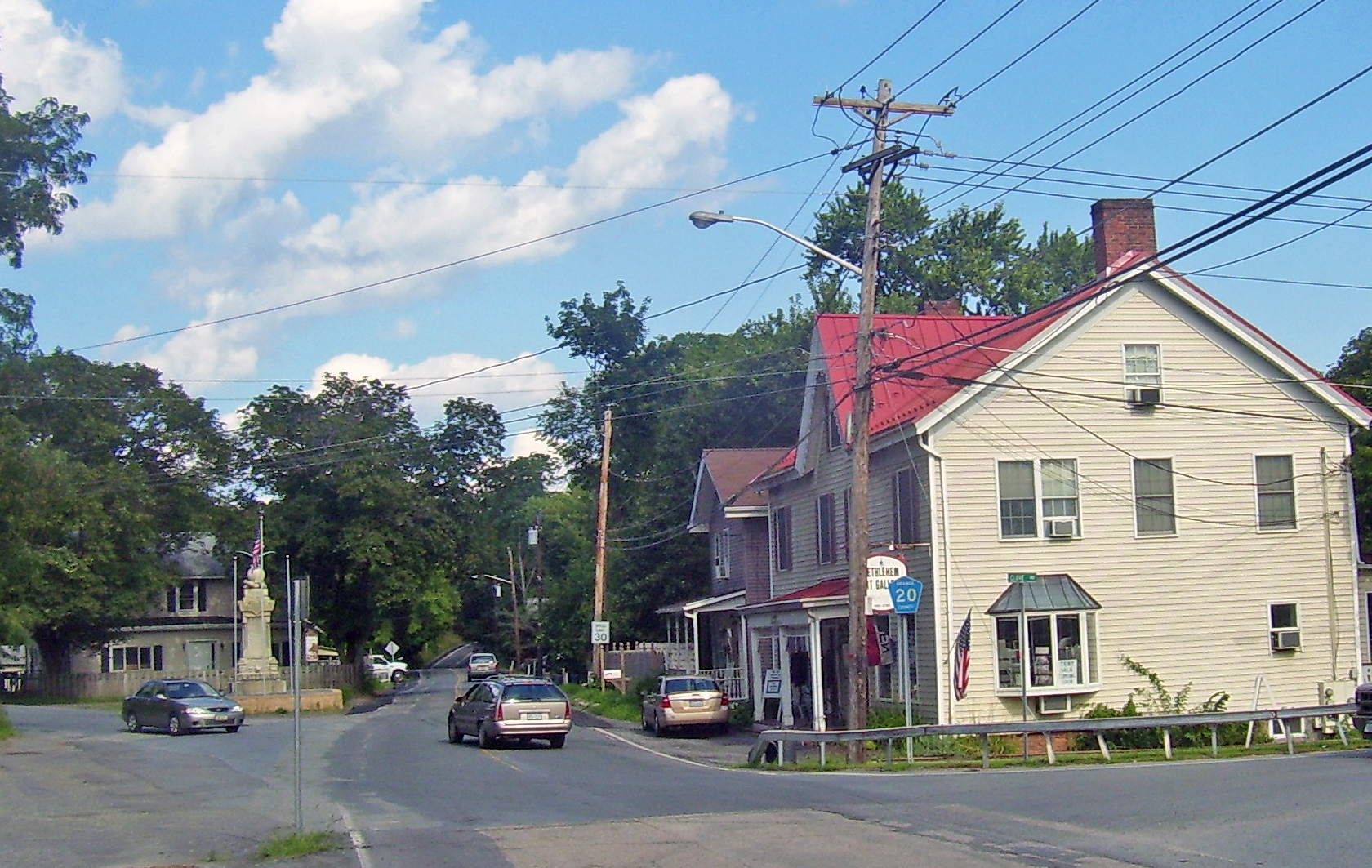
- Downtown Salisbury Mills

- Location within New York Location within the United States
- Coordinates: 41°25′50″N 74°7′9″W
- Country: United States
- State: New York
- County: Orange
- Towns: Blooming Grove; Cornwall

Area
  - Total: 0.50 sq mi (1.30 km^{2})
  - Land: 0.50 sq mi (1.29 km^{2})
  - Water: 0.0039 sq mi (0.01 km^{2})
- Elevation: 280 ft (85 m)

Population (2020)
  - Total: 580
  - Density: 1,160/sq mi (449/km^{2})
- Time zone: UTC-5 (Eastern (EST))
  - Summer (DST): UTC-4 (EDT)
- ZIP Code: 12577
- Area code: 845
- FIPS code: 36-64859
- GNIS feature ID: 2584289

Salisbury Mills (/sɔːlzˈbəri/ SAWLZ-bər-ee) is a hamlet and census-designated place (CDP) in the towns of Blooming Grove and Cornwall in Orange County, New York, United States. As of the 2020 census, it had a population of 580.

The CDP is in eastern Orange County and is bordered to the north by Beaver Dam Lake. Salisbury Mills is built along Moodna Creek, which flows east into the Hudson River between New Windsor and Cornwall-on-Hudson. The Moodna Viaduct, the longest actively used rail trestle in the eastern United States, crosses Moodna Creek at the eastern edge of the CDP.

New York State Route 94 forms the northern edge of the CDP. It leads northeast 6 miles (10 km) to New Windsor and southwest 10 miles (16 km) to Chester. Newburgh is 8 miles (13 km) to the northeast, and Middletown is 19 miles (31 km) to the west.

== Demographics ==
Historical population
Census	Pop.	Note	%±
2010	536		—
2020	580		8.2%
U.S. Decennial Census

== Education ==
Most of it is in Cornwall Central School District while a portion is in Washingtonville Central School District.
