= Mountain Lodge Park, New York =

Mountain Lodge Park
- Hamlet
- Location of Mountain Lodge Park in Orange County and the state of New York

- Location within New York Location within the United States
- Coordinates: 41°23′N 74°08′W
- Country: United States
- State: New York
- County: Orange
- Town: Blooming Grove

Area
  - Total: 1.48 sq mi (3.84 km^{2})
  - Land: 1.48 sq mi (3.83 km^{2})
  - Water: 0.0039 sq mi (0.01 km^{2}) 0.26%

Population (2020)
  - Total: 1,910
  - Density: 3,349/sq mi (1,293.2/km^{2})
- Time zone: UTC-5 (EST)
  - Summer (DST): UTC-4 (EDT)
- ZIP Code: 10950

Mountain Lodge Park is in the town of Blooming Grove in Orange County, New York, United States. It is built on the western slope of Schunemunk Mountain, the highest in the county. The population was 1,910 as of the 2020 census.

== History ==
Historically, Mountain Lodge Park was a community of summer homes, but over the years it has gradually been transformed to mostly full year residences. There are approximately 800 homes that are split between the two 'sides'. One side is considered the Mountain Lodge Park side and the other side is called Glenwood Hills. Mountain Lodge Park was developed with some fits and starts, just before and then after World War Two. Glenwood Hills was developed in the 1950s, with building continuing into the 1970s. During the Carter Administration, the community was offered an opportunity to pave all roads and install municipal water and sewage lines while it was being rebuilt after a terrible storm. The residents in the area turned down the offer as it would have increased taxes on homes that were unoccupied for most of the year. Generally on the Mountain Lodge Park side, the houses are further apart but most of the roads (trails) are unpaved. On the Glenwood Hills side, most of the houses are closer together but the roads are paved.

From the 1960s through the 1980s, the community featured a volunteer fire department, a general store, a seasonal municipal water supply, two neighboring horseback riding academies, a large pool area, a synagogue, and a multi-purpose meeting house. Mountain Lodge Road, which is paved, owned and maintained by the Town of Blooming Grove. In Mountain Lodge Park, Mountain Lodge Road begins just after Oakwood Trail both North and South and Water Tank Road in this order, Cascade Trail, Echo Trail, Woodland Circle South, Woodland Circle North, Silver trail (leads to Brookside Trail), Utopian Trail, Emerald Trail, Arcadian Trail (which leads into Arbor Trail, Stanton Trail, Gloria Trail), Sylvan Trail, Laurel Trail (which leads to Sunset Trail), Hillcrest Trail, Paradise Trail, Orchard Trail, Higgins Trail, Cedar Trail, Hillside Trail, Underhill Trail, Grandview Trail, Valley Trail, bearing to the right Moran Trail, Brook Trail, then exits Mountain Lodge Park and cuts a winding path to nearby Clove Road in Washingtonville.

Former New York City Councilman Peter Vallone, Sr. is said to have lifeguarded at the pool there.

== Geography ==
According to the United States Census Bureau, the CDP has a total area of 1.481 square miles (3.84 km^{2}), of which 1.477 square miles (3.83 km^{2}) is land and 0.004 square miles (0.010 km^{2}) (0.26%) is water.

== Education ==
The school district is Washingtonville Central School District.
