= Otter Kill =

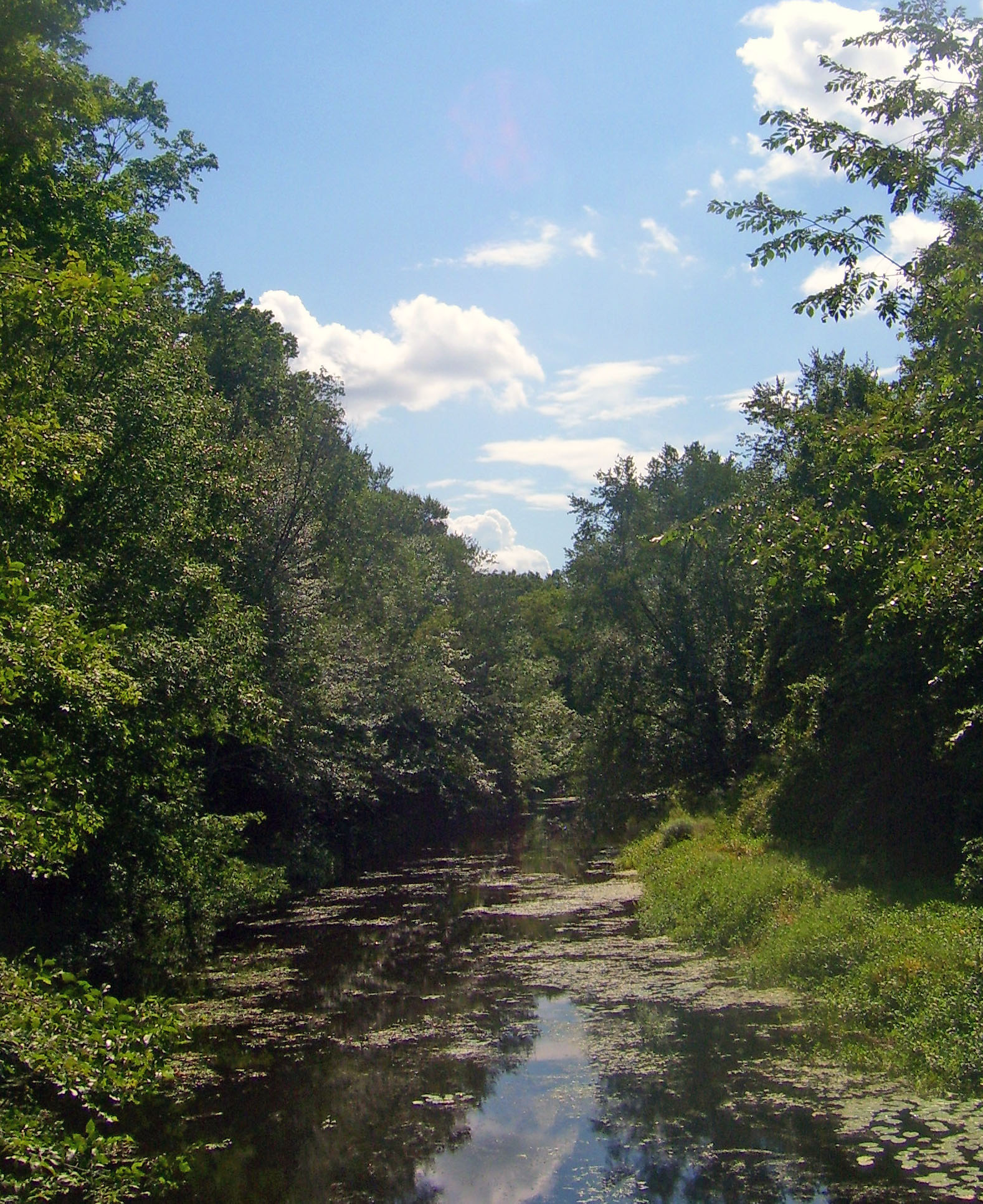
- Otter Kill at Otter Road in Hamptonburgh

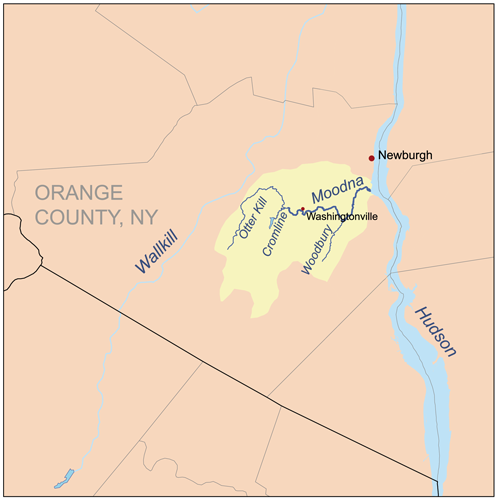
- Otter Kill within the Moodna Creek watershed
- Etymology: From the animal of that name

Location
- Country: United States
- State: New York
- Region: Hudson Valley
- County: Orange
- Towns: Goshen, Hamptonburgh, Blooming Grove

Physical characteristics
- Source: Goshen Reservoir#2
  - location: Town of Goshen
  - coordinates: 41°22′07″N 74°18′56″W
  - elevation: 460 ft (140 m)
- Mouth: Confluence with Cromline Creek at Moodna Creek
  - location: N of Washingtonville
  - coordinates: 41°25′51″N 74°11′41″W
  - elevation: 300 ft (91 m)

Basin features
- River system: Moodna Creek
- Tributaries
  - right: Black Meadow Creek

Otter Kill is a 16.0-mile-long (25.7 km) tributary of Moodna Creek that flows through central Orange County, New York, in the United States. Via the Moodna, which it forms at a confluence with Cromline Creek north of the village of Washingtonville, its waters eventually reach the Hudson River.

The Otter Kill flows primarily through rural, undeveloped areas of the towns of Goshen, Hamptonburgh and Blooming Grove. Development pressures in those areas have led the state Department of Environmental Conservation to classify it and a major tributary, Black Meadow Creek, as threatened streams.

== Course ==
The Otter Kill traces a semicircular route through the northwestern Moodna valley. It rises from the north end of Goshen's Reservoir #2 and flows generally in that direction, under NY 17. Two miles from its source, in the swamps east of the village of Goshen, it receives its largest tributary, Black Meadow Creek. It continues in the same direction, through more swamps surrounded by farmland, into the town of Hamptonburgh.

Just east of the Campbell Hall Metro-North station, the stream begins to bend toward the east. After crossing under the tracks and then NY 207 just east of the hamlet of Campbell Hall, the largest settlement the Otter comes near, it widens and turns even more sharply to the east, paralleling Route 207.

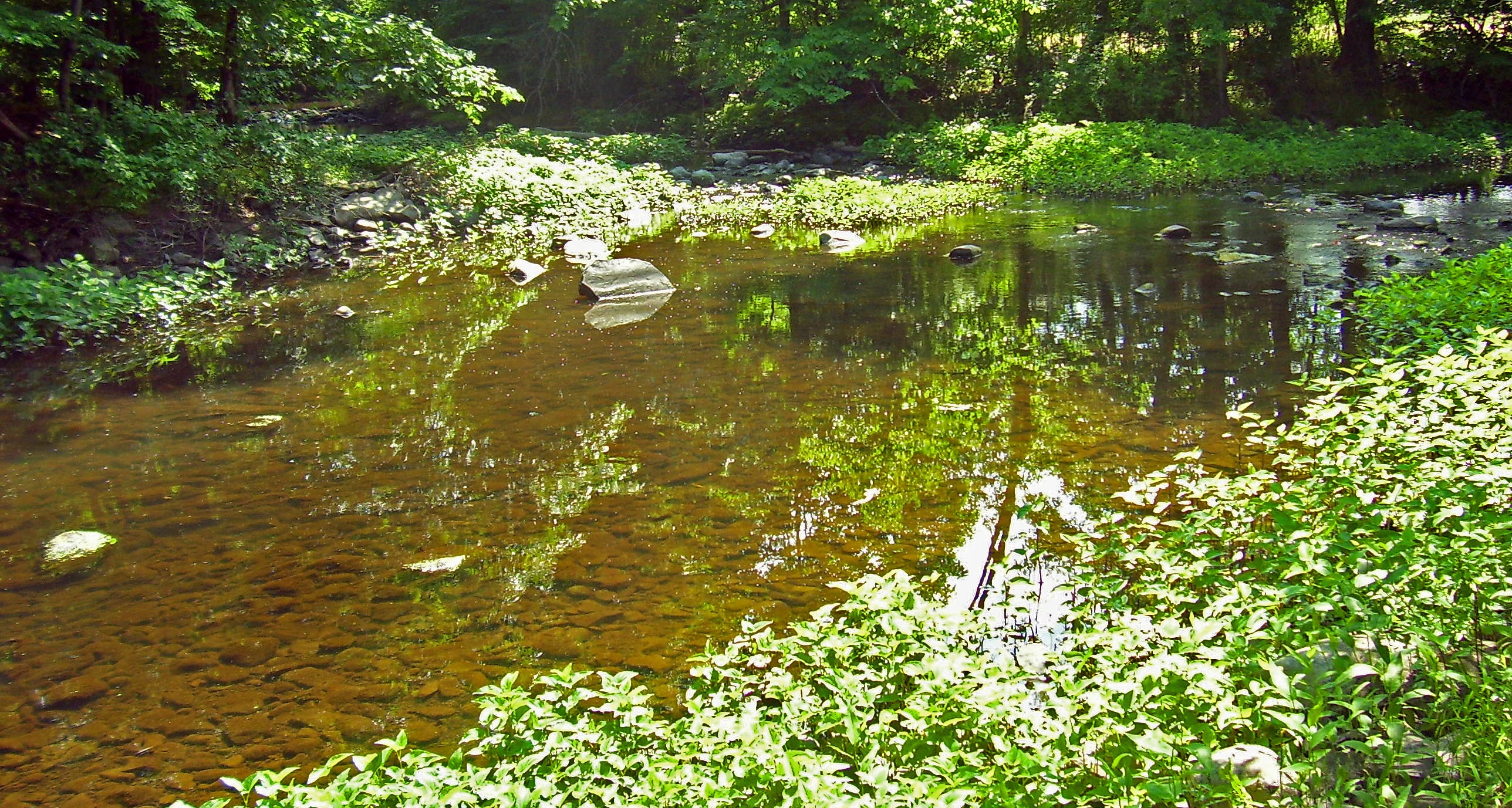
Confluence with Cromline Creek (top), creating Moodna Creek (left)

At Brown's Pond near the hamlet of Rock Tavern, it goes over a small dam, crosses under Routes 207 and 208, then turns to the south, paralleling the latter highway. It crosses under the Port Jervis Line once again. Just after flowing under Route 208 again at an eastward bend of the highway, it meets Cromline Creek and the two continue as Moodna Creek to the Hudson at Cornwall.
