= South Blooming Grove, New York =

- Village
- Village of South Blooming Grove
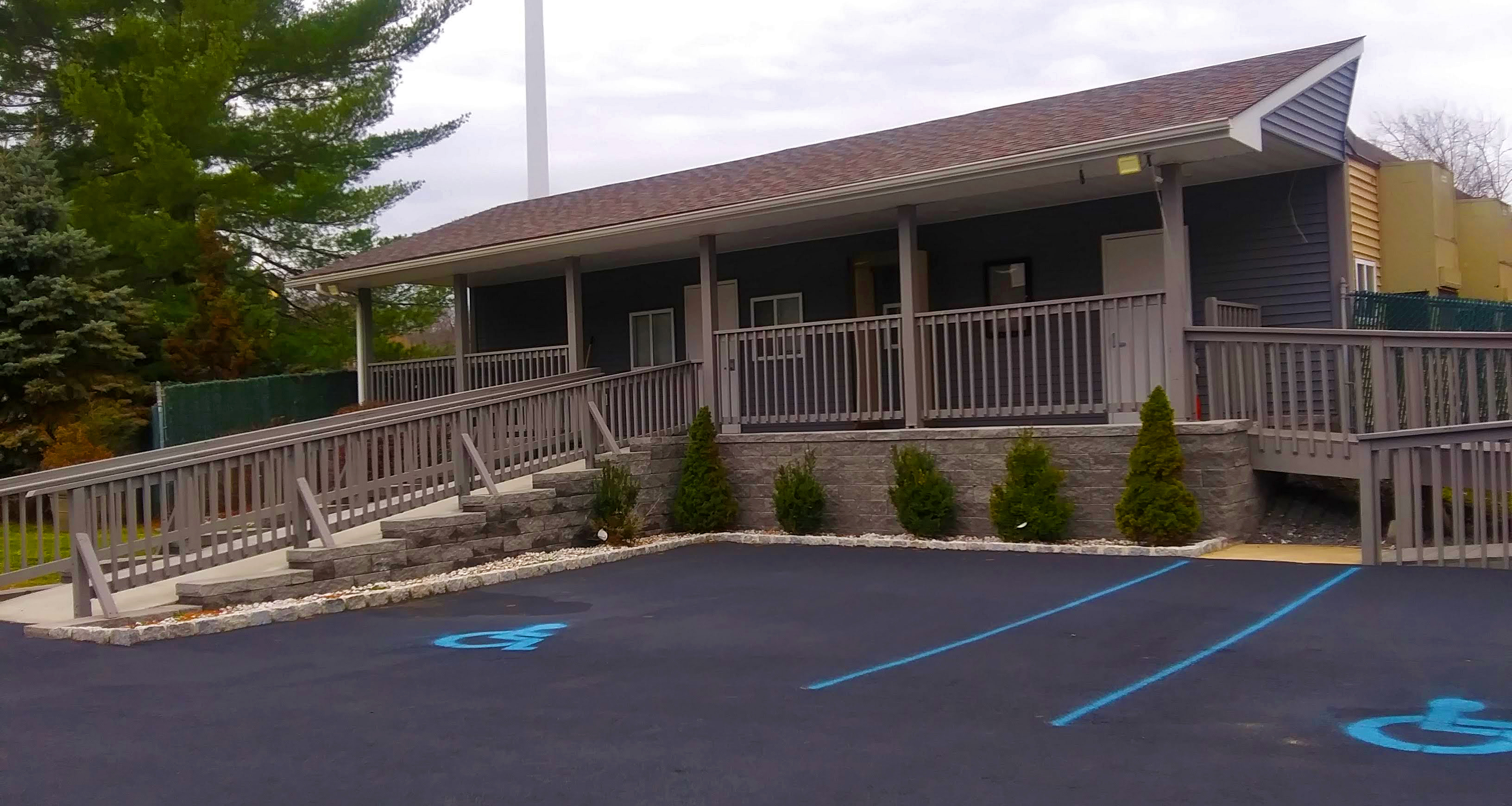
- Village hall

- Location in Orange County and the state of New York.

- Location of South Blooming Grove within the state of New York
- Coordinates: 41°22′24″N 74°10′42″W
- Country: United States
- State: New York
- County: Orange County
- Town: Blooming Grove
- Incorporated (village): 2006

Area
  - Total: 4.71 sq mi (12.20 km^{2})
  - Land: 4.68 sq mi (12.11 km^{2})
  - Water: 0.035 sq mi (0.09 km^{2})

Population (2020)
  - Total: 3,973
  - Density: 849.6/sq mi (328.02/km^{2})
- Time zone: UTC-5 (Eastern (EST))
  - Summer (DST): UTC-4 (EDT)
- FIPS code: 36-68610
- GNIS feature ID: 2391145
- Website: www.sbgny.gov

South Blooming Grove is a village inside the Town of Blooming Grove in Orange County, New York, United States. As of the 2020 census the population was 3,973. It is part of the Kiryas Joel–Poughkeepsie–Newburgh, NY Metropolitan Statistical Area as well as the larger New York–Newark–Bridgeport, NY-NJ-CT-PA Combined Statistical Area.

== History ==
The idea for incorporating a new village came in 2004 when a group called the South Blooming Grove Homeowner's Association was concerned about the rapid expansion of the sprawling Satmar Hasidim village of Kiryas Joel and hoped to prevent unchecked annexation of land for high-density residential housing by incorporating a section of the large, unincorporated area known as Blooming Grove. After gathering over 1,000 signatures in favor of the new village, a New York State Supreme Court Justice put things on hold in January 2005. Finally, on June 29, 2006, incorporation passed overwhelmingly, 856 votes to 89.

A similar incorporation vote was held on August 11, 2006 in the neighboring Town of Woodbury; it also passed by a wide margin.

On September 2, 2006, South Blooming Grove held its first board elections. The candidates for mayor (Robert Jeroloman) and four trustee seats (Garry Dugan, Jim Mulany, Dorine Sas and John Hickey) ran unopposed. All five have since been re-elected, again unopposed: Sas and Hickey in 2008 and 2012, and Dugan, Mulany and Jeroloman in 2010. In the 2014 elections, Mayor Jeroloman and Trustee Mulany were again re-elected, but Gary Dugan did not seek another term; James LoFranco was elected to Dugan's old seat.

In the September 2020 election, three challengers backed by South Blooming Grove's growing Hasidic community won control of the village's governing board. In the March 2021 election, Hasidic-backed candidates won the remaining two board seats; resulting in the five member village board being composed of four Hasidic members, plus the mayor (George Kalaj) who is not Hasidic but was elected with the backing of the Hasidic community.

== Demographics ==
Historical population
| Census | Pop. | Note | %± |
|---|---|---|---|
| 2010 | 3,234 | | — |
| 2020 | 3,973 | | 22.9% |
U.S. Decennial Census

=== 2020 census ===
As of the 2020 census, South Blooming Grove had a population of 3,973. The median age was 26.8 years. 39.0% of residents were under the age of 18 and 9.9% of residents were 65 years of age or older. For every 100 females there were 102.4 males, and for every 100 females age 18 and over there were 101.8 males age 18 and over.

91.5% of residents lived in urban areas, while 8.5% lived in rural areas.

There were 1,045 households in South Blooming Grove, of which 47.9% had children under the age of 18 living in them. Of all households, 58.9% were married-couple households, 16.6% were households with a male householder and no spouse or partner present, and 18.8% were households with a female householder and no spouse or partner present. About 16.9% of all households were made up of individuals and 7.2% had someone living alone who was 65 years of age or older.

There were 1,226 housing units, of which 14.8% were vacant. The homeowner vacancy rate was 1.5% and the rental vacancy rate was 7.0%.

Racial composition as of the 2020 census
| Race | Number | Percent |
|---|---|---|
| White | 2,786 | 70.1% |
| Black or African American | 311 | 7.8% |
| American Indian and Alaska Native | 25 | 0.6% |
| Asian | 52 | 1.3% |
| Native Hawaiian and Other Pacific Islander | 5 | 0.1% |
| Some other race | 484 | 12.2% |
| Two or more races | 310 | 7.8% |
| Hispanic or Latino (of any race) | 555 | 14.0% |

=== Demographic estimates ===
As of 2023, South Blooming Grove had a population of 3,880 people with 1,170 households. The median age was 25.2.

Racial composition as of 2023
| Race | Number | Percent |
|---|---|---|
| White (Non-Hispanic) | 3,170 | 81.8% |
| Hispanic | 361 | 9.3% |
| Black or African American | 165 | 4.25% |
| White (Hispanic) | 54 | 1.39% |
| Two or more races excluding other, & three or more races | 47 | 1.21% |
| Two races including other (Hispanic) | 42 | 1.08% |
| Two races excluding other, & three or more races (Hispanic) | 16 | 0.412% |
| Other (Non-Hispanic) | 12 | 0.309% |
| Two races including other | 9 | 0.232% |

As of 2026, South Blooming Grove has a population of 3,797 people, with the median age being 24.3.

== Education ==
Most of the village is in Washingtonville Central School District, while portions are in Monroe-Woodbury Central School District.
