= Sugar Loaf, New York =

Hamlet in Orange County, New York

Sugar Loaf
- Hamlet
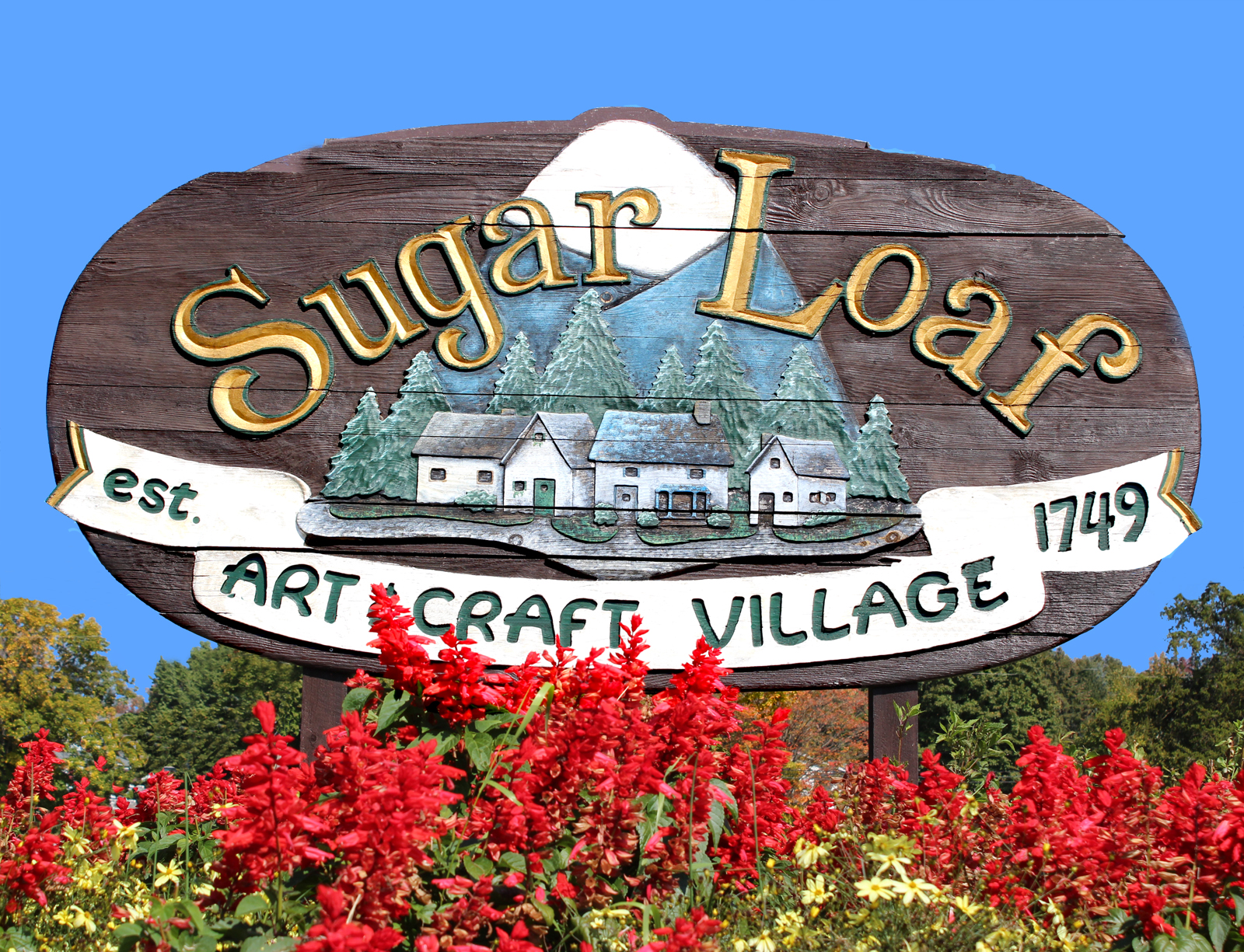
- Sugar Loaf Welcome Sign
- Motto: Art & Craft Village
- Location within New York Location within the United States
- Coordinates: 41.3190°N 74.2913°W
- Country: United States
- State: New York
- County: Orange
- Founded: 1749

Dimensions
  - Length: 6.2 mi (10 km)
  - Width: 5.0 mi (8 km)
- Time zone: UTC-5 (EST)
  - Summer (DST): UTC-4 (EDT)
- ZIP Code: 10981
- Area code: 845

Sugar Loaf is a mixed-use hamlet in Orange County, New York, United States. It is located in the Town of Chester, within view of Sugar Loaf mountain.

== History ==
Historical marker at the intersection of Kings Highway and Pine Hill Road

The hamlet of Sugar Loaf, New York, was founded in the late 1740s as a waypoint along Kings Highway. Businesses supplied food and other goods, and horses to travelers.

Local historian Dr. Richard Hull writes about the name:

It is still not certain how Sugar Loaf acquired its name. The most plausible tale is that Elizabeth Dobbin, during her first winter here [circa 1738], gazed up at that huge bald uplifted fault block, shrouded in heavy morning mist, so frosty at the summit yet so greenish-brown at the base, and was reminded of the hard loaves of sugar she and all colonial housewives made in their smokey kitchens.

Note that the name of the mountain in Orange County, New York (as well as the hamlet itself), is somewhat distinguished by the use of two words instead of one.

By the early 19th century, Sugar Loaf was a saloon community. One of the favorite pastimes of the men was harness or flat racing. They were eager to compete their horses. Hambletonian 10, considered the sire of all American standardbred horses, was born in Sugar Loaf in 1848.

America's first recorded murder-for-hire took place on "Calamity Corners" at the intersection of Pine Hill and Hambletonian Roads.

Throughout the remainder of the 19th century, and for most of the 20th century, Sugar Loaf remained a quiet, pastoral hamlet, renowned for bawdy, Apple-Jack saloons. During the Prohibition era, speakeasies were established for the enjoyment of countless jazz-age revelers en route to the Glenmere mansion estate on Pine Hill Road, on Glenmere Lake.

== Current state ==
For the last half century through today the hamlet has existed as an artists community with a number of artists working and living in buildings and barns that endure from the 18th century. Artist studios are independently owned and operated by the artists themselves with many studios open to the public for viewing work in progress as well as purchasing.

== Geography ==
Sugar Loaf is a hamlet of roughly six miles' length and five miles' width. It extends from Chester's Durland Hill, near the Chester Library, west into the town of Warwick, into the hamlet of Bellvale.

There is a post office at the northeast end of the village. The Hamlet's zip code is 10981. The Hamlet of Sugar Loaf lies within the Town of Chester, and hence shares its area code and exchange, 845, 469. The greater Hamlet extends into Warwick, as well 845, 986. The Hamlet of Sugar Loaf antedates the later Town of Chester, and it was originally administered under the Town of Warwick. Proponents of the annexation of Sugar Loaf back to Warwick cite this precedent administration.

== Notable people ==
- Reid Duke – professional Magic: The Gathering player
- Jason Boone – professional basketball player
