= Blooming Grove, New York =

- Town
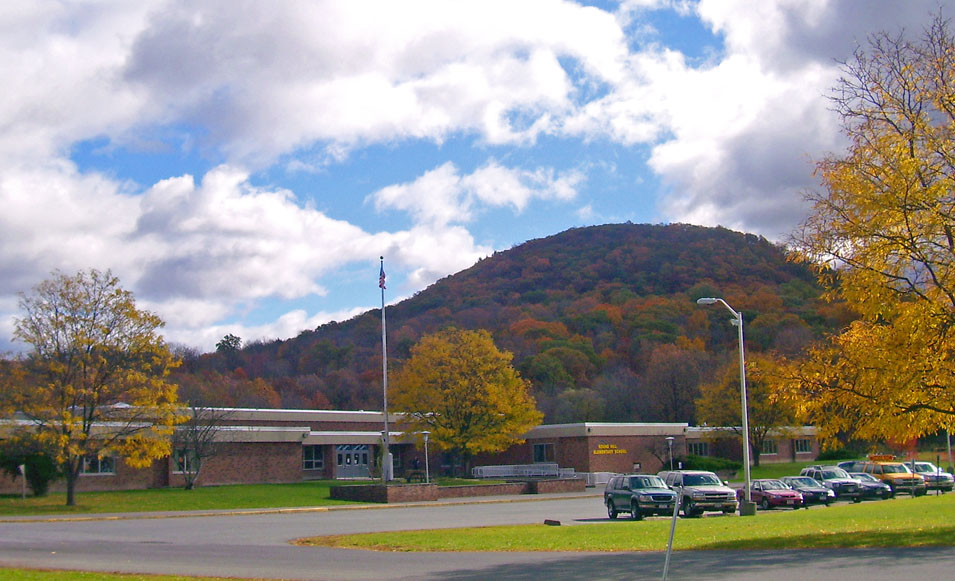
- Round Hill from New York State Route 208 in 2006

- Location in Orange County and the state of New York.

- Location within the state of New York
- Coordinates: 41°26′N 74°10′W
- Country: United States
- State: New York
- County: Orange

Government
  - Type: Town Council
  - Town Supervisor: Robert C. Jeroloman
  - Town Council: Members' List: • Cathy Gregg-Acevedo Ward 1 Deputy Supervisor; • Frank Malloy Ward 2 Councilperson; • Johanna Kiernan Ward 3 Councilperson; • Simon Schwartz Ward 4 Councilperson; • John Stegenga Sr. Ward 5 Councilperson; • Steven J. Amante Ward 6 Councilperson

Area
  - Total: 35.35 sq mi (91.56 km^{2})
  - Land: 34.74 sq mi (89.97 km^{2})
  - Water: 0.62 sq mi (1.60 km^{2})
- Elevation: 374 ft (114 m)

Population (2020)
  - Total: 18,811
- Time zone: UTC-5 (Eastern (EST))
  - Summer (DST): UTC-4 (EDT)
- ZIP code: 10914 (Also serviced by the Monroe post office ZIP 10950)
- Area code: 845
- FIPS code: 36-07003
- GNIS feature ID: 0978739
- Website: Town website

Blooming Grove is a town in Orange County, New York, United States. The population was 18,811 at the 2020 census. It is located in the central part of the county, southwest of Newburgh.

== History ==
Vincent Mathews was likely the earliest settler who purchased the Rip Van Dam patent in 1721, built a grist mill and named his settlement "Mathewsfield." He was the father of David Mathews, a Loyalist who was Mayor of New York.

The town of Blooming Grove was formed from the town of Cornwall in 1799. In 1830, the town of Hamptonburgh was established from part of Blooming Grove. Another part of Blooming Grove was taken to form the town of Chester in 1845.

The village of South Blooming Grove was incorporated in July 2006.

Andrew Jackson Davis, the "Poughkeepsie Seer", was born in Blooming Grove in 1826.

The Brotherhood Winery in Washingtonville is the oldest continuously operating winery in the United States, having been established in 1839.

== Geography ==
According to United States Census Bureau data, the town has a total area of 35.3 square miles (91 km^{2}), of which 34.8 square miles (90 km^{2}) is land and 0.5 square miles (1.3 km^{2}) (1.42%) is water.

The concurrent New York State Route 17 and U.S. Route 6 pass through the south of Blooming Grove.

== Demographics ==
Historical population
| Census | Pop. | Note | %± |
|---|---|---|---|
| 1800 | 1,611 | | — |
| 1810 | 1,759 | | 9.2% |
| 1820 | 2,219 | | 26.2% |
| 1830 | 2,099 | | −5.4% |
| 1840 | 2,396 | | 14.1% |
| 1850 | 2,184 | | −8.8% |
| 1860 | 2,248 | | 2.9% |
| 1870 | 2,502 | | 11.3% |
| 1880 | 2,444 | | −2.3% |
| 1890 | 2,236 | | −8.5% |
| 1900 | 2,188 | | −2.1% |
| 1910 | 2,110 | | −3.6% |
| 1920 | 1,881 | | −10.9% |
| 1930 | 1,922 | | 2.2% |
| 1940 | 2,312 | | 20.3% |
| 1950 | 2,410 | | 4.2% |
| 1960 | 3,777 | | 56.7% |
| 1970 | 8,813 | | 133.3% |
| 1980 | 12,339 | | 40.0% |
| 1990 | 16,673 | | 35.1% |
| 2000 | 17,351 | | 4.1% |
| 2010 | 18,028 | | 3.9% |
| 2020 | 18,811 | | 4.3% |
U.S. Decennial Census

As of the census of 2010, there were 18,028 people, 6,284 households, and 4,750 families residing in the town. The population density was 510.7 inhabitants per square mile (197.2/km^{2}). There were 6,954 housing units at an average density of 197 per square mile (76/km^{2}). The racial makeup of the town was 84.5% white, 6.2% African American, .5% Native American, 2.2% Asian, .02% Pacific Islander, 3.8% from other races, and 2.6% from two or more races. Hispanic or Latino of any race were 15% of the population.

Of the town's 6,284 households, 39.5% contained children under the age of 18, 62% were married couples living together, 9.1% had a female householder with no husband present, and 24.4% were non-families. Nearly 20% of households had only one member and 6.4% of households consisted only of someone 65 years of age or older. The average household size was 2.86 and the average family size was 3.33. The town's population has a wide age distribution, with 25.3% under the age of 18 and 11.6% who were 65 years of age or older. The median age was 40.8 years. The population was 49.3% male and 50.7% female.

According to the 2013 American Community Survey, the median income for a household in the town was $89,327, and the median income for a family was $100,142. Full-time, year-round male workers had a median income of $65,685 versus $50,835 for females. The per capita income for the town was $34,472. About 3.2% of families and 6.2% of the population were below the poverty line, including 8.8% of those under age 18 and 2.8% of those age 65 or over.

For people 5 years of age and older, an estimated 83.7% spoke only English, 12.1% could speak Spanish and 21.9% spoke English less than "very well." An estimated 93.4% of people aged five years and older were born in the United States while 1.8% are not citizens. The most common ancestry groups were overwhelmingly estimated to be Irish, Italian, German and "American."

== Communities and locations within the town of Blooming Grove ==
- Beaver Dam Lake – a hamlet that is also partially located in the towns of New Windsor and Cornwall
- Beaverdam Lake – a lake that is surrounded by the hamlet of Beaver Dam Lake
- Blooming Grove – the hamlet of Blooming Grove, located on New York State Route 94, south of Washingtonville
- Bull Mine – a hamlet in the southern part of town on New York State Route 208
- Craigville – a hamlet on Route 94
- Mountain Lodge Park – a former summer community located on Schunemunk Mountain
- Oxford – a hamlet in the south part of town by New York State Route 17
- Salisbury Mills – a hamlet by the eastern town line on NY-94. The hamlet is also located in the town of Cornwall.
- Schunnemunk Mountain – the highest mountain in the county is at the eastern town line.
- South Blooming Grove – a village in the southern part of the town incorporated in 2006
- Tomahawk Lake – a lake by the western boundary of the town
- Washingtonville – the village of Washingtonville is located at the junction of Routes 94 and 208.
