= Chester, Orange County, New York =

Chester, New York
- Town
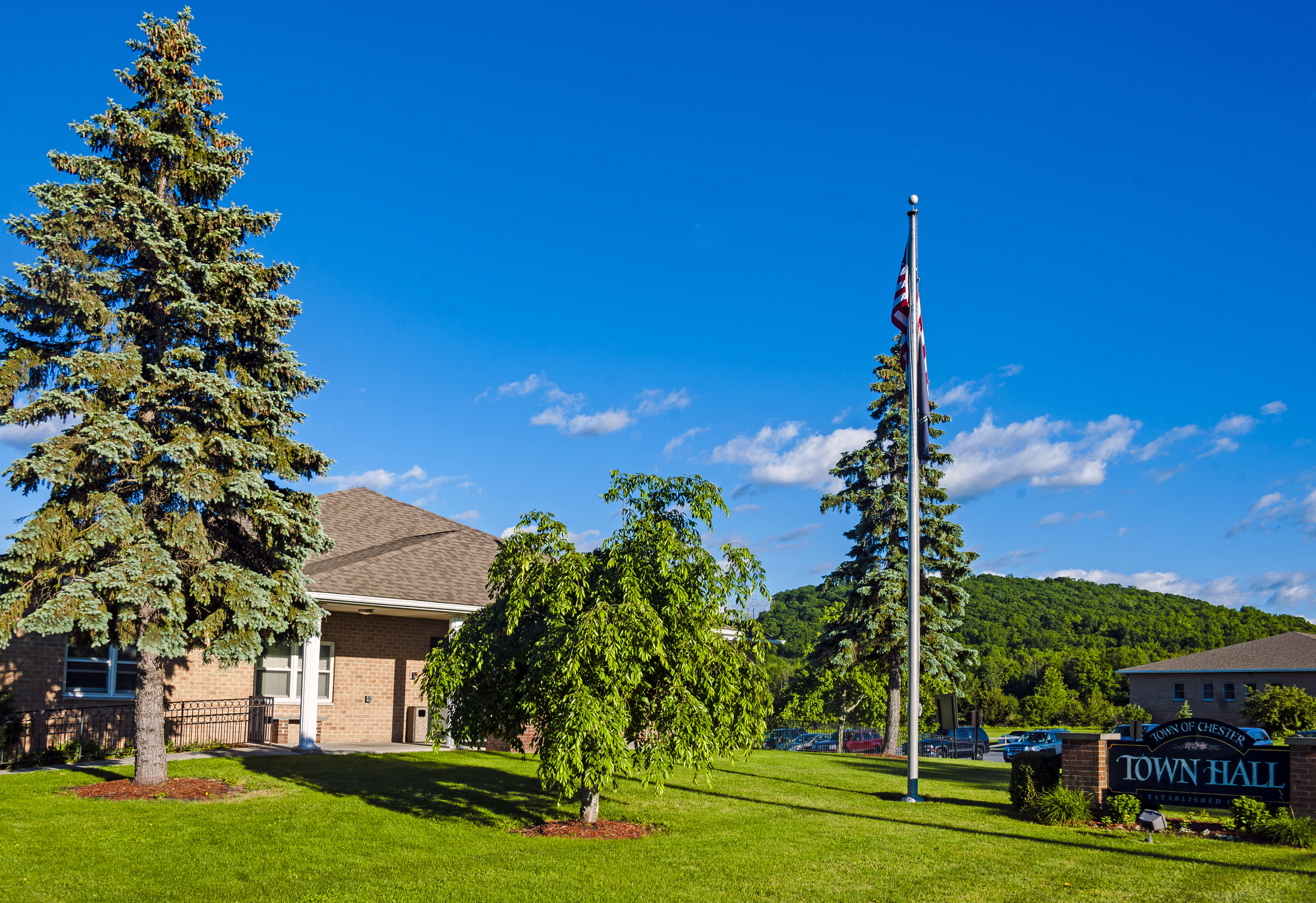
- Town hall

- Flag

- Location in Orange County and the state of New York.

- Location of Chester in New York Chester, New York (the United States)
- Coordinates: 41°21′25″N 74°16′37″W
- Country: United States
- State: New York
- County: Orange
- Settled: 1721
- Established: 1845

Government
  - Type: Town council
  - Town supervisor: Brandon Holdridge (DEM)
  - Town council: Members' list: • Bob Courtenay (REP); • Brandon Holdridge (DEM); • Antonio Ardisana (REP); • Cindy Smith (REP)

Area
  - Total: 25.20 sq mi (65.27 km^{2})
  - Land: 25.05 sq mi (64.88 km^{2})
  - Water: 0.15 sq mi (0.39 km^{2})

Population (2020)
  - Total: 12,646
  - Density: 476.83/sq mi (184.11/km^{2})
- FIPS code: 36-071-15308
- Website: www.chester-ny.gov

Chester is a town in Orange County, New York, United States. The population was 12,646 at the 2020 census. Chester contains a village, also called Chester.

Chester is the birthplace of Philadelphia-style cream cheese.

== History ==
The Lenape people have settled in Orange County for over 5,000 years. Europeans first settled in the 1700s which were ethnic Dutch and English colonists.

The economy of the early town was based on dairy products, particularly milk. This industry flourished because completion of the Erie Railroad in 1841, which ran through Chester, enabled local farmers to ship their products to New York City, where demand was high. For instance, local farmer Phil Gregory would ship 240 quarts (230 L) of milk by train to New York City. The railroad earned $1.20 ($29 in modern dollars) in freight charges; Gregory's business eventually grew to 300,000 quarts (280,000 L) of milk per day, which in turn gave the railroad over $1,000 ($24,000 in modern dollars) in daily profit.

=== Late 20th century to present ===
In 2018, the Town of Chester approved a large residential development. It learned that the development appeared to be targeted toward the Satmar Hasidic community, whose rapid growth in this area had caused tensions. The large families of the Orthodox created strains for the local public school system, and there were other tensions between the strict Kiryas Joel and neighboring communities. Town supervisor Alex Jamieson told a local newspaper that the town would be buying up areas of undeveloped open space, including around the planned development in Chester, in order "to keep the Hasidic out so that they can't control the Town Board." His comments were widely reported and criticized by The Forward as antisemitic.

== Geography ==
According to the United States Census Bureau, the town has a total area of 25.2 square miles (65 km^{2}), of which 25.2 square miles (65 km^{2}) is land and 0.1 square miles (0.26 km^{2}) (0.24%) is water.

Conjoined NY-17 and US-6 pass through the northern part of Chester. NY-94 crosses NY-17 south of Chester village.

== Demographics ==
Historical population
Census	Pop.	Note	%±
1850	1,641		—
1860	1,849		12.7%
1870	2,113		14.3%
1880	2,229		5.5%
1890	2,112		−5.2%
1900	2,186		3.5%
1910	2,061		−5.7%
1920	1,803		−12.5%
1930	2,164		20.0%
1940	2,776		28.3%
1950	2,878		3.7%
1960	3,494		21.4%
1970	4,767		36.4%
1980	6,850		43.7%
1990	9,138		33.4%
2000	12,140		32.9%
2010	11,981		−1.3%
2020	12,646		5.6%
U.S. Decennial Census 2020

As of the census of 2017, there were 12,140 people, 3,848 households, and 3,016 families residing in the town. The population density was 482.2 inhabitants per square mile (186.2/km^{2}). There were 3,984 housing units at an average density of 158.3 units per square mile (61.1 units/km^{2}). The racial makeup of the town was 76.7% White, 9.8% Black or African American, 0.5% Native American, 4.3% Asian, 0.0% Pacific Islander, and 3.2% from two or more races. Hispanic or Latino of any race were 10.14% of the population.

There were 3,782 households, out of which 41.5% had children under the age of 18 living with them, 66.7% were married couples living together, 8.2% had a female householder with no husband present, and 21.6% were non-families. 16.9% of all households were made up of individuals, and 4.9% had someone living alone who was 65 years of age or older. The average household size was 2.92 and the average family size was 3.31.

In the town, the population was spread out, with 27.4% under the age of 18, 5.6% from 18 to 24, 33.8% from 25 to 44, 25.7% from 45 to 64, and 7.7% who were 65 years of age or older. The median age was 37 years. For every 100 females, there were 111.8 males. For every 100 females age 18 and over, there were 112.0 males.

The median income for a household in the town was $69,280, and the median income for a family was $75,222. Males had a median income of $53,528 versus $36,673 for females. The per capita income for the town was $25,900. About 2.7% of families and 7.2% of the population were below the poverty line, including 4.9% of those under age 18 and 3.7% of those age 65 or over.

== Communities and locations in Chester ==
- Camp Monroe – a multi-denominational Jewish sleep-away summer camp founded in 1941 near the southern border with the town of Monroe.
- Chester – a village located on NY-94.
- East Chester – a hamlet southeast of Chester village.
- Greycourt – site of former major railroad intersection and depot on the Erie Main Line.
- Glenmere Lake – a reservoir at the western town line
- Goose Pond Mountain State Park – a state park southeast of Chester village.
- Lake Hill Farms– a subdivision of about 175 homes in the southwestern corner of the town first developed in 1973.
- Sugar Loaf – the oldest community in the town, antedating Chester town by more than a century (1738). The hamlet is home to the harness-racing horse Hambletonian 10.
- Surrey Meadows – a late 1960s subdivision north of Chester village. The elementary school is located in this area.
- Walton Park – a hamlet on the border of the towns of Chester and Monroe.

== Education ==
School districts covering sections of the Town of Chester include Chester Union Free School District, Monroe-Woodbury Central School District, Wallkill Central School District and Florida Union Free School District.

The Roman Catholic Archdiocese of New York operates area Roman Catholic schools. St. Columba School in Chester closed in 1991.

== Notable people ==
- Edward Orton Jr., dean of the Ohio State University College of Engineering, ceramics engineer, inventor, and manufacturer

== See also ==
- List of towns in New York (state)
