= Chester (village), New York =

Chester, New York
- Village
- Village of Chester
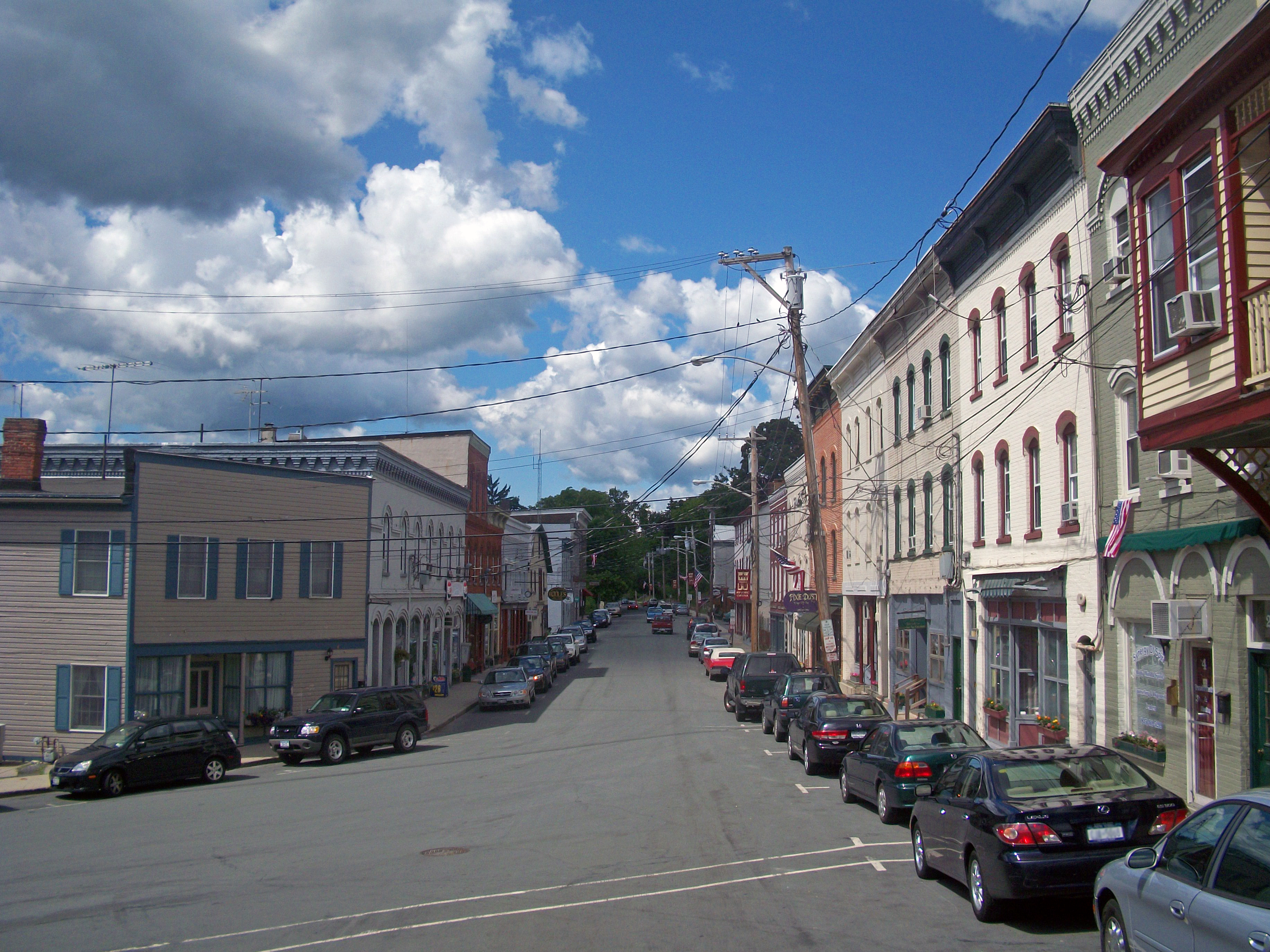
- View south along Main Street
- Etymology: From city in England
- Location in Orange County and the state of New York.

- Location of New York in the United States
- Coordinates: 41°21′27″N 74°16′32″W
- Country: United States
- State: New York
- County: Orange
- Founded: 1892

Government
  - Type: Village Hall, 47 Main Street
  - Mayor: Christopher Battiato

Area
  - Total: 2.15 sq mi (5.56 km^{2})
  - Land: 2.15 sq mi (5.56 km^{2})
  - Water: 0 sq mi (0.00 km^{2})
- Highest elevation (Unnamed hill in S of village): 572 ft (174 m)
- Lowest elevation: 420 ft (130 m)

Population (2020)
  - Total: 3,993
  - Density: 1,858.8/sq mi (717.67/km^{2})
- Time zone: UTC-5 (Eastern (EST))
  - Summer (DST): UTC-4 (EDT)
- ZIP Code: 10918
- Area code: 845
- FIPS Code: 36-15297
- GNIS feature ID: 0946539
- Wikimedia Commons: Chester, Orange County, New York
- Website: Village of Chester New York

Chester is a village in Orange County, New York, United States. The population was 3,993 at the 2020 census. It was named after the City of Chester in the Cheshire region of northwest England. Chester is part of the Poughkeepsie–Newburgh–Middletown, NY Metropolitan Statistical Area as well as the larger New York–Newark–Bridgeport, NY-NJ-CT-PA Combined Statistical Area.

== History ==
The village of Chester was incorporated in 1892. The first Mayor of Chester was William A. Lawrence, the inventor of modern day cream cheese. At the center of a dairy industry, the village claims Philadelphia Cream Cheese was founded here. Other brands produced in Chester were Clover Brand, Cow Brand, D’isigny, Fromage De Brie, Neufchatel, Star Brand and World Brand.

The village of Chester contains a historic section called Downtown Historic Chester. The Orange Heritage rail trail begins here at the site of the former Erie Railroad train station.

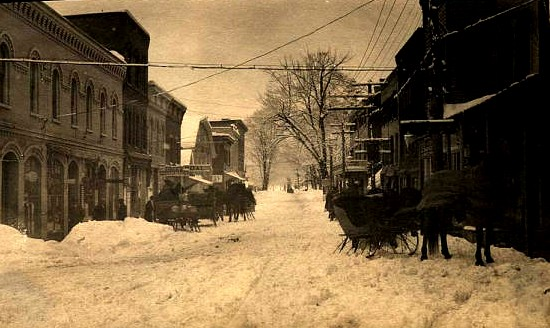
Main Street, 1914

High Street looking towards Washingtonville, ca 1880

== Geography ==
The village of Chester is located in northern part of the Town of Chester, and has a total area of 2.1 square miles (5.5 km^{2}), all land.

Highway access is provided by NY-94. Goose Pond Mountain State Park is southeast of the village.

== Demographics ==
Historical population
Census	Pop.	Note	%±
1870	686		—
1900	1,250		—
1910	1,210		−3.2%
1920	1,049		−13.3%
1930	1,154		10.0%
1940	1,140		−1.2%
1950	1,215		6.6%
1960	1,492		22.8%
1970	1,627		9.0%
1980	1,910		17.4%
1990	3,270		71.2%
2000	3,445		5.4%
2010	3,969		15.2%
2020	3,993		0.6%
U.S. Decennial Census

As of the census of 2000, there were 3,445 people, 1,396 households, and 901 families residing in the village. The population density was 1,628.0 inhabitants per square mile (628.6/km^{2}). There were 1,455 housing units at an average density of 687.6 per square mile (265.5/km^{2}). The racial makeup of the village was 83.45% White, 7.72% Black or African American, 0.93% Native American, 2.96% Asian, 2.61% from other races, and 2.32% from two or more races. Hispanic or Latino of any race were 10.16% of the population.

There were 1,396 households, out of which 30.7% had children under the age of 18 living with them, 50.8% were married couples living together, 10.5% had a female householder with no husband present, and 35.4% were non-families. 28.0% of all households were made up of individuals, and 8.2% had someone living alone who was 65 years of age or older. The average household size was 2.45 and the average family size was 3.04.

In the village, the population was spread out, with 23.5% under the age of 18, 7.3% from 18 to 24, 36.7% from 25 to 44, 21.6% from 45 to 64, and 10.9% who were 65 years of age or older. The median age was 36 years. For every 100 females, there were 92.4 males. For every 100 females age 18 and over, there were 89.0 males.

The median income for a household in the village was $55,417, and the median income for a family was $65,321. Males had a median income of $47,386 versus $31,957 for females. The per capita income for the village was $24,960. About 4.2% of families and 6.0% of the population were below the poverty line, including 7.7% of those under age 18 and 7.8% of those age 65 or over.

== Education ==
The school district is Chester Union Free School District.

== Notable people ==
- William Terry Jackson, former US Congressman
- Andy Grammer, singer/songwriter
