= Balázs =

- Gender: masculine
- Language: Hungarian
- Name day: February 3

Origin
- Language: Latin

Other names
- Nicknames: Bazsi, Bali, Balu
- Anglicisation: Blaise

Balázs (Hungarian pronunciation: [ˈbɒlaːʒ]) is a Hungarian surname and male given name, equivalent to the French name Blaise.

== Etymology ==
The etymology of the word is disputed. In some explanations, the Latin name Blasius has been identified with the Greek Basileus, meaning 'royal'. Other sources explain the meaning of the name as a combination of two words. According to those, the prefix is blandus ('affable') or belasius~bel ('dress'), while in the suffix syros ('small') lies.

== As a settlement name ==
The name frequently appears as a toponym, particularly within the former territory of the Kingdom of Hungary. However, in some cases, it is exclusively present or identifiable in the Hungarian version of the settlement's name.

- Zalaszentbalázs (Hungary)
- Szentbalázs (Hungary)
- Baláže (Hungarian: Balázs) (Slovakia)
- Blažov (Hungarian: Balázsfa) (Slovakia, Dunajská Streda District)
- Blažov (Hungarian: Balázsvágás) (Slovakia, Prešov Region)
- Blažovce (Hungarian: Turócbalázsfalva) (Slovakia)
- Blaj (Hungarian: Balázsfalva) (Romania)
- Blăjel (Hungarian: Balázstelke) (Romania)
- Balazher (Hungarian: Balazsér) (Ukraine)

== Notable people ==
As a surname:

- André Balazs (born 1957), American hotelier and residential developer
- Anna Balazs (born 1953), American materials scientist
- Árpád Balázs (born 1937), Hungarian classical music composer
- Attila Balázs (born 1988), Hungarian tennis player
- Attila F. Balázs (born 1954), Hungarian poet, writer, translator, editor and publisher
- Béla Balázs (1884–1949), Hungarian-Jewish film critic and poet
- Benjamin Balázs (born 1990), Hungarian footballer
- Bernadett Balázs (born 1975), Hungarian gymnast
- Csilla Balázs (born 1996), Romanian footballer of Hungarian descent
- Endre Alexander Balazs (1920–2015), Hungarian-American in the New Jersey Inventors Hall of Fame
- Erzsébet Balázs (1920–2014), Hungarian gymnast
- Éva Balázs (1942–1992), Hungarian cross-country skier
- Fecó Balázs (1951–2020), Hungarian musician, recording artist and singer
- Frank Balazs (1918–1962), American football player
- Gábor Balázs (born 1983), Hungarian canoeist
- George H. Balazs, American zoologist
- Gergely Balázs (born 1982), Hungarian footballer
- Harold Balazs (1928–2017), American sculptor
- István Balázs, later Étienne Balazs (1905–1963), Hungarian-French sinologist
- István Balázs (archer) (born 1952), Hungarian archer
- Janika Balázs (1925–1988), Serbian musician
- Jolán Balázs, known as Iolanda Balaș (1936–2016), Romanian high jumper
- József Balázs, multiple people
- Krisztián Balázs (born 2002), Hungarian gymnast
- Márton Balázs (1929–2016), Romanian mathematician of Hungarian descent
- Mihály Balázs (born 1948), Hungarian historian
- Mór Balázs (1849–1897), Hungarian entrepreneur and engineer
- Nándor Balázs (1926–2003), Hungarian-American physicist
- Péter Balázs, multiple people
- Samu Balázs (1906–1981), Hungarian actor
- Zolt Balazs (born 1963), Romanian alpine skier
- Zoltán Balázs (born 1977), Romanian-Hungarian actor, stage director and set designer
- Zsofia Balazs (born 1990), Canadian swimmer
- Zsolt Balázs (born 1988), Hungarian footballer

As a middle name:

- Bence Balázs Bíró (born 1998), Hungarian footballer

As a given name:

- Balázs Adolf (born 1999), Hungarian canoeist
- Balázs Ander (born 1976), Hungarian politician
- Balázs Babella (born 1978), Hungarian canoeist
- Balázs Bacskai (born 1988), Hungarian boxer
- Balázs Baji (born 1989), Hungarian hurdler
- Balázs Bakti (born 2004), Hungarian footballer
- Balázs Balogh, multiple people
- Balázs Bekő (born 1971), Hungarian football manager and player
- Balázs Bényei (born 1990), Hungarian footballer
- Balázs Bérczy (born 1966), Hungarian footballer
- Balázs Berdó (born 1982), Hungarian footballer
- Balázs Berke (1754–1821), Slovenian writer
- Balázs Bese (born 1999), Hungarian footballer
- Balázs Birkás (born 1996), Hungarian canoeist
- Balázs Birtalan (1969–2016), Hungarian writer
- Balázs Borbély (born 1979), Hungarian football manager and player
- Balázs Bozori (born 1982), Hungarian footballer
- Balázs Bús (born 1966), Hungarian politician
- Balázs Csák (born 1979), Hungarian astronomer
- Balázs Csákabonyi (1936–2020), Hungarian politician
- Balázs Csányi (died 1532), Hungarian nobleman and royal counselor
- Balázs Csillag (born 1979), Hungarian long-distance runner
- Balázs Csiszér (born 1999), Romanian footballer
- Balázs Dinka (born 1976), Hungarian footballer
- Balázs Diószegi (1914–1999), Hungarian artist
- Balázs Dzsudzsák (born 1986), Hungarian footballer
- Balázs Erdélyi (born 1990), Hungarian water polo player
- Balázs Farkas, multiple people
- Balázs Fülei (born 1984), Hungarian pianist
- Balazs Gardi (born 1975), Hungarian-American photographer
- Balázs Gercsák (born 1986), Hungarian swimmer
- Balázs Gőz (born 1992), Hungarian ice hockey player
- Balázs Granát (born 1985), Hungarian footballer
- Balázs Gulyás (born 1956), Hungarian neurobiologist
- Balázs Győrffy (1938–2012), Hungarian-American-British theoretical physicist
- Balázs Győrffy (politician) (born 1979), Hungarian politician
- Balázs Hajdú (born 1975), Hungarian sailor
- Balázs Hankó (born 1978), Hungarian politician
- Balázs Hárai (born 1987), Hungarian water polo player
- Balázs Havasi (born 1975), Hungarian pianist and composer
- Balázs Hidvéghi (born 1970), Hungarian politician
- Balázs Hoksary (1902–1988), Romanian football manager and player
- Balázs Holló (born 1999), Hungarian swimmer
- Balázs Horváth (1942–2006), Hungarian politician
- Balázs Kaizinger (born 1979), Hungarian equestrian
- Balázs Kiskapusi (born 1975), Hungarian footballer
- Balázs Kiss, multiple people
- Balázs Knoch (born 1979), Hungarian speed skater
- Balázs Kocsár (born 1963), Hungarian orchestral and operatic conductor
- Balázs Korányi (born 1974), Hungarian middle-distance runner
- Balázs Koszó (born 1988), Hungarian footballer
- Balázs Kovács, multiple people
- Balázs Ladányi (born 1976), Hungarian ice hockey player
- Balázs Laluska (born 1981), Hungarian handball player
- Balázs Lászka (born 1978), Hungarian footballer
- Balázs Lengyel, multiple people
- Balázs Lovrencsics (born 1991), Hungarian footballer
- Balázs Magyar (died 1490), Hungarian military commander
- Balázs Major (born 1990), Hungarian ice dancer
- Balázs Makány (born 1987), Hungarian swimmer
- Balázs Manner (born 2005), Hungarian footballer
- Balázs Megyeri (born 1990), Hungarian footballer
- Balázs Molnár (born 1977), Hungarian football manager and player
- Balázs Nagy, later Michel Varga (1927–2015), Hungarian-French activist
- Balázs Nagy (born 1998), Hungarian-American pair skater
- Balázs Nánási (born 1989), Hungarian footballer
- Balázs Németh (born 1988), Hungarian motorcycle racer
- Balázs Nikolov (born 1977), Hungarian footballer
- Balázs Orbán (1829–1890), Hungarian writer and politician
- Balázs Orbán (politician) (born 1986), Hungarian lawyer and politician
- Balázs Pándi (born 1983), Hungarian drummer
- Balázs Petró (born 1997), Hungarian footballer
- Balázs Plisz (born 2004), Hungarian athlete
- Balázs Rabóczki (born 1978), Hungarian footballer
- Balázs Sallai (born 1979), Hungarian footballer
- Balázs Sarus (born 1988), Hungarian footballer
- Balázs Schrancz (born 1977), Hungarian footballer
- Balázs Sebestyén (born 1977), Hungarian media person
- Balázs Sebők (born 1994), Hungarian ice hockey player
- Balázs Sinkó (born 1979), Hungarian footballer
- Balázs Slakta (born 1994), Hungarian footballer
- Balázs Szirányi Somogyi (born 1983), Spanish water polo player
- Balázs Szabó, multiple people
- Balázs Szegedy (born 1974), Hungarian mathematician
- Balázs Szép (born 1999), Hungarian modern pentathlete
- Balázs Szokolay (born 1961), Hungarian pianist
- Balázs Szöllősi (born 1992), Hungarian handball player
- Balázs Taróczy (born 1954), Hungarian tennis player
- Balázs Tölgyesi (born 1973), Hungarian middle-distance runner
- Balázs Tornay (born 1969), Hungarian alpine skier
- Balázs Tóth, multiple people
- Balázs Tóthmajor (born 1986 or 1987), Hungarian politician
- Balázs Trencsényi (born 1973), Hungarian historian
- Balázs Venczel (born 1986), Hungarian footballer
- Balázs Veress (born 1980), Hungarian tennis player
- Balázs Villám (born 1989), Hungarian footballer
- Balázs Vincze (born 1967), Hungarian water polo coach and player
- Balázs Latrompette Yann (born 1977), French-Hungarian cross-country skier
- Balázs Zamostny (born 1992), Hungarian footballer

== Sources ==
- Fercsik, Erzsébet; Raátz, Judit (2009). Keresztnevek enciklopédiája (PDF) (in Hungarian). Budapest: Tinta Könyvkiadó. ISBN 978 963 9902 18 3. Archived from the original (PDF) on 2024-03-09.
