= Black Rock Forest =

Privately run nature preserve in Cornwall, New York, U.S.

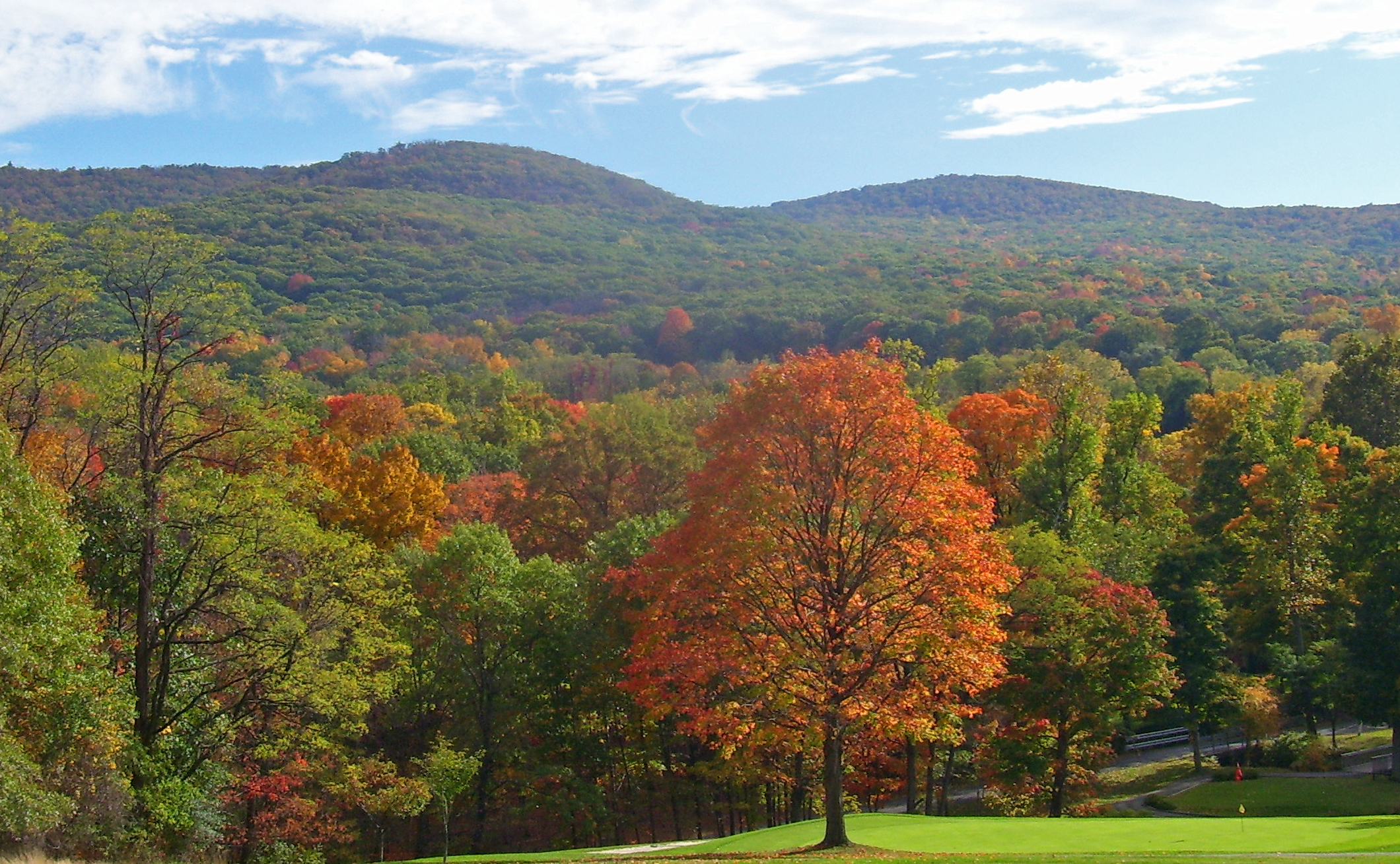
- Mount Misery (left) and Black Rock from Deer Hill in Cornwall-on-Hudson

- Location within New York Location within the United States
- Location: Orange County, New York, United States
- Nearest town: Cornwall
- Coordinates: 41°24′29″N 74°01′18″W
- Area: 6.1 sq mi (16 km^{2})
- Elevation: 1,402 ft (427 m)
- Named for: Magnetite deposits in forest
- Operator: Black Rock Forest Consortium
- Website: Black Rock Forest Consortium

Black Rock Forest is a 3,920-acre (15.9 km^{2}) forest and biological field station maintained by Black Rock Forest Consortium. It is located in the western Hudson Highlands region of the U.S. state of New York, in Orange County, mostly in the town of Cornwall, with the southern fringe overlapping into the neighboring town of Highlands.

Established by a local physician, Dr. Ernest G. Stillman, in 1927, the forest was the property of Harvard University from 1949 until 1989. The Consortium has invested heavily in facilities to improve its research and educational missions and promote sustainability, erecting several green buildings in the middle of the forest with guest facilities, classrooms, and laboratories. Its educational facilities are used by groups at every level, from elementary grades to college undergraduates. Over 400 papers have been published from research done in the forest.

== History ==
The forest began to grow in the area about 14,000 years ago, with the retreat of the glaciers at the end of the last Ice Age. Originally, like many post-glacial forests, it consisted of evergreen conifers such as spruce and fir, but as the climate warmed they gave way to the deciduous species of oak and maple that now predominate.

Like much of the Highlands, the land now part of Black Rock had been heavily impacted by human usage. Native communities hunted the forest extensively, built large settlements, and started forest fires to clear sections of the woods and prevent larger natural ones. After colonization of the Hudson Valley in 1690, the impact of human activity increased. During the last years of the Revolutionary War, the Continental Army used the Continental Road that runs through the center of the property to get between West Point and its encampment at New Windsor. Spy Rock got its name from its use by Continental soldiers as a lookout point where they could monitor Newburgh Bay for any signs of British activity on the strategically important Hudson River.

Throughout the 19th century, Black Rock Forest saw extensive logging and mining, with some homesteads and farms established in its lower-lying portions. Only one building, the 1834 Chatfield Stone House, remains today. As the forest land began to decline in value with the depletion of its productive resources, various tracts were bought by the Stillman family in the late 19th and early 20th centuries. In 1927, enough land had been acquired for James Stillman's son Ernest, to officially create Black Rock Forest for research and demonstration purposes. He hoped to restore it to productive use again through newly developed practical forestry techniques, as well as leaving plenty of undisturbed land available for use in silvicultural research.

To this end he hired a forester, Hal Tryon, and a small crew to cull unwanted species and poorly growing trees from wanted ones. The forest improved considerably, and upon his death in 1949 Stillman left the forest to his alma mater, Harvard University, for the continuation of its purposes. During Harvard's ownership of the forest, 75 scientific papers were published based on research in it. Hiking trails were also developed in the forest under the auspices of the New York - New Jersey Trail Conference. During the late 1960s and 1970s the Forest faced its biggest threat, as a massive power plant proposed for nearby Storm King Mountain by Consolidated Edison would have flooded most of it to build a large reservoir. That plan was eventually abandoned in 1982 after a landmark environmental lawsuit.

Since Harvard also owns the eponymous forest closer to campus in Petersham, Massachusetts, in 1981 it asked another alumnus, William T. Golden, what he thought should be done with Black Rock. He suggested that there were plenty of local organizations which might be able to derive the same benefit from it, and approached them about forming a consortium or similar group to take over from Harvard. Many were enthusiastic about the idea but lacked enough funds to contribute even a share of the purchase price. Golden decided to purchase the land himself in 1989 and give it to a newly created Black Rock Forest Preserve, which in turn leases it to the Black Rock Forest Consortium. Harvard donated the purchase price to the forest as the beginning of an endowment, and Golden added to that with more of his own money.

== Geography ==
The forest is nestled in an area roughly bounded by US 9W to the east and Angola Road (which it does not reach) on the north. To the southwest, a small portion, the former Mineral Springs Nature Preserve, protrudes to a public access point on Old Mineral Springs Road. A large tract along the western boundary, and a smaller one to the east, are designated as ecological reserves within the forest.

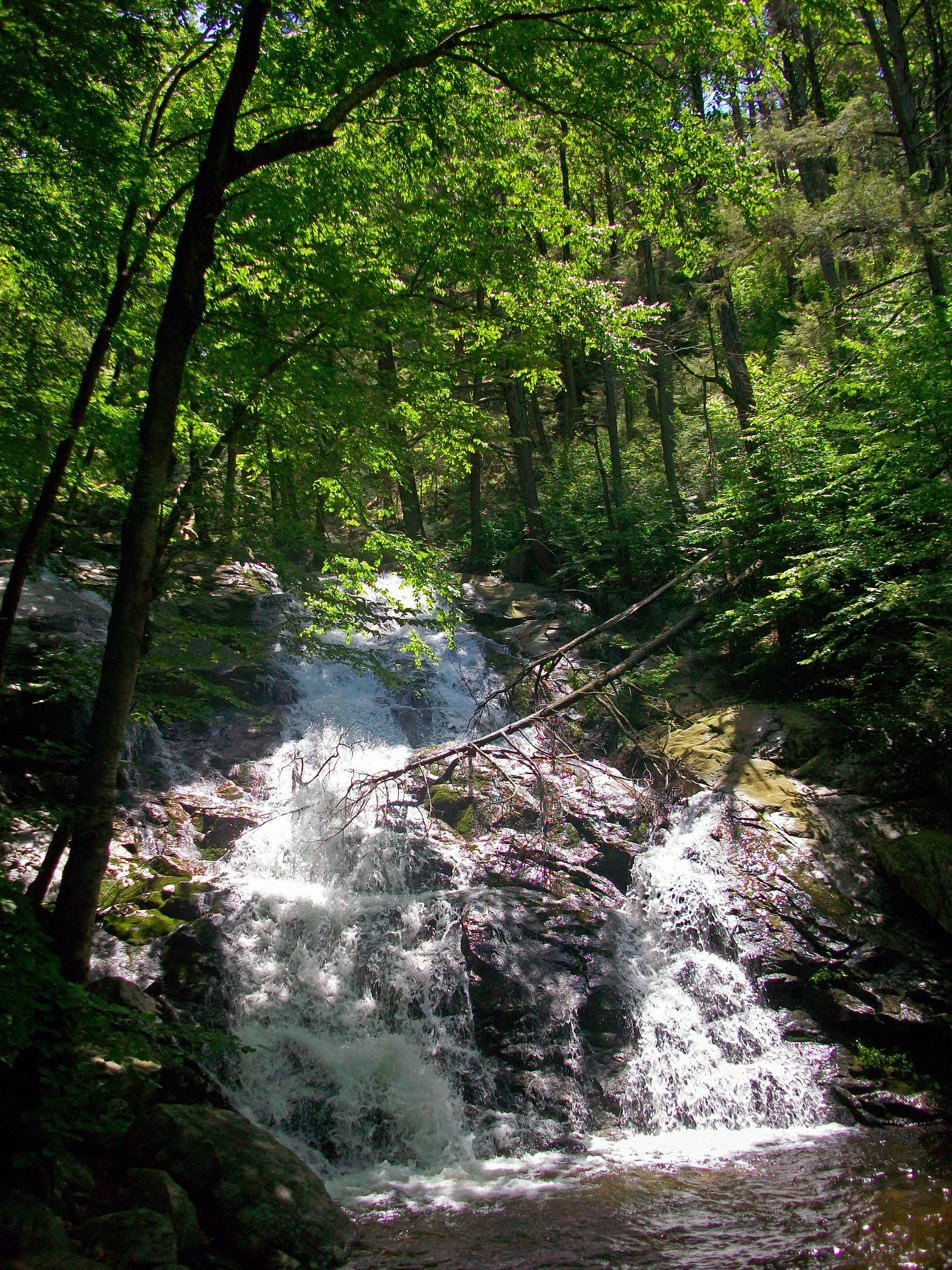
Mineral Springs Falls

Most public access comes from Route 9W, near the lowest portions of the land, and many of the research and educational facilities are located in that north central area. To the south, in the Highlands portion of the forest, the land rises over a thousand feet (300 m) to several peaks, including the eponymous 1,402 foot (427 m) Black Rock with its observation tower and Spy Rock, at 1,463 feet (446 m) the highest point in the Town of Highlands and the highest peak in the Highlands west of the Hudson River. There are seven water bodies in the forest, all of which form part of the village of Cornwall-on-Hudson's water supply system excepting Sutherland Pond. The ponds drain into an unnamed stream that crosses the village and empties into Moodna Creek near where it joins the Hudson; Sutherland gives rise to Mineral Springs Brook, which flows out to the scenic Mineral Springs Falls near the western end of the forest and then to Moodna Creek's main tributary, Woodbury Creek.

The forest is buffered by other, nearby protected areas in two directions, with Storm King State Park on the east across Route 9W and the large United States Military Academy reservation directly to the south. In other directions the large, minimally developed tracts of private landowners serve as a buffer.

=== Roads and trails ===
A network of old logging and mining roads, including the Continental Road, still exists and provides access to many points in the central region of the park. They are closed to all motor-vehicle use save that authorized by the Consortium for its members; they are open to bicycles and foot traffic and marked as part of the forest's trail system.

Together with cut footpaths, the roads provide over 30 miles (50 km) of trails in Black Rock Forest. Most are short routes between the roads and other trails or spurs to various overlooks running less than two miles (3 km) in total length. The two exceptions are the Scenic and Stillman trails, backbone routes across the park in different directions, both also carrying the long-distance Highlands Trail for all or most of their lengths.

The Scenic Trail, the longest in the forest at 5.9 miles (9.5 km), runs from its western trailhead on Old Mineral Springs Road near the falls atop the ridge past Spy Rock to end at a junction with the Stillman trail near Mount Misery. The Stillman Trail, named for the forest's founder, is actually a continuation of a trail that begins in Cornwall-on-Hudson and goes over Storm King, then crosses 9W into the forest. It runs 5.3 miles (8.5 km) across the forest and over Black Rock to end at an overlook to Schunemunk Mountain and Mountainville near the forest's western boundary.

== Geology ==
The forest is one of the northernmost sections of the Highlands Province of the Appalachian Mountains. The Precambrian gneiss bedrock in the forest is the oldest in New York State, formed 1.1 billion-1.3 billion years ago and first uplifted during the Taconic Orogeny 460 million-440 million years ago. The Acadian and Alleghenian orogenies further shaped the mountains to their present form, and then the glaciers and erosion wore them down.

Within the gneiss can be found several other minerals: feldspar, quartz, pyroxene and mica. Black bands within the bedrock come from the mineral that gave the forest its name: magnetite, a source of iron. Two plane crashes on the Hill of Pines, less than 600 feet (180 m) apart, are believed to have occurred because of the mineral's influence on the aircraft compasses.

== Biological resources ==
Black Rock Forest's flora and fauna are part of the Northeastern coastal forests ecoregion.

=== Flora ===
Botanists working in the forest have identified several distinct plant communities, including 60 species of tree, within it, spread among six different regions. The most widespread is an oak forest found in the drier lowlands, where red oak, the most common canopy tree on the property, predominates along with maples, hickory and black birch. Some chestnuts, once the dominant canopy tree before the chestnut blight, survive as well. Shrubs include mountain laurel and witch-hazel.

The same trees can also be found in the wetlands. More associate species show up, particularly sugar maple, as well as beech, basswood and sweetgum. The understory add ironwood, striped maple and spicebush. In flooded areas, red maple and alder, which can tolerate the water, are dominant along with leatherleaf and sphagnum. A few gray birch are found along the edges of ponds, and eastern hemlock can be found along some of the streams, cooling the water with its shade.

Higher up the ridges, as the soils thin, the dominant oaks are the chestnut and scrub oak varieties found on most montane sites in the Highlands. Pitch pine cannot flourish anywhere else in the forest except in the thin soils found here, and on the bare rocks sensitive lichens, mosses and grasses take hold where they can.

A 2003 study by the Brooklyn Botanical Garden identified 688 species of vascular plants in the forest over an eight-year period. It found ten species rare in New York, and six considered endangered by the state, including Virginia snakeroot and swollen bladderoot

The Brooklyn Botanical Garden also identified 63 species of mosses.

=== Fauna ===
As in other woodlands in the Eastern United States, white-tailed deer are the most abundant mammal within Black Rock Forest, providing ample hunting opportunities. Common associate species like foxes, mink, striped skunks and raccoons are also common, as are rodent species like squirrels, chipmunks and shrews. Some bat species also have taken up residence. Coyotes have made a comeback since 1985, and there have been signs of beaver activity although the animals themselves have rarely been seen.

Many reptiles and amphibians common to Eastern forests are well represented. These include several salamander species, a few frogs, the American toad, and the Eastern box and painted turtles. Some venomous snakes have been found, although garter snakes and other non-venomous species are more common.

Woodland birds like wild turkey are dominant among avian species, with Canada geese and great blue herons conspicuous in and near the reservoirs. Smaller birds include the downy and hairy woodpeckers. All are prey for common predator species like the red-tailed hawk, Cooper's hawk and barred owl.

Most insect species have not been formally counted. The American Museum of Natural History (AMNH), a consortium member, has counted 296 spider species in the forest as of 2005, while a survey published in 2014 identified 279 species of spiders. In 2006, a Harvard study found 33 ant species and projected a possible 58 in the forest. Surveys by AMNH in 2003 recorded 144 bee species, as well 22 vespid wasp species and 23 crabronid wasp species.

== Management ==
Black Rock Forest is run on a daily basis by a small staff headed by an Executive Director. Dr. William Schuster was Executive Director from 1992 to 2022, and Isabel Ashton is the current ED. They report to the Consortium's board, which is composed of six officers, a representative of each member organization, 13 directors-at-large, and the seven members of the Black Rock Forest Preserve board. It was chaired by Sibyl R. Golden, who also edited Black Rock Forest News, the Consortium's quarterly newsletter, until her death in 2017. The current chair is Hume R. Steyer, and Barnard professor Hillary S. Callahan serves as president of the Board.

=== Land usage ===
The forest is free and open to the public daily for hiking and mountain biking, but within strict rules in order to preserve its value as a research and educational facility. No motor vehicles other than those authorized by the forest are allowed on its roads, and then only within a 10 mph (16 km/h) speed limit. The forest closes at dusk daily; no camping is permitted except for authorized research or Consortium education light-impact stays. Research plots, when clearly marked, are not to be disturbed.

Hikers are asked to stay on marked trails and refrain from bushwhacking. Swimming and fishing are permitted only in Sutherland Pond and Mineral Springs Brook. Only members of the Black Rock Fish and Game Club are allowed to hunt in the forest during New York State firearm regular deer season in late fall; the forest is closed to the public during that period.

=== Facilities ===
During the Stillman and Harvard eras, the forest administration worked out of what is now known as the Old Headquarters, on Continental Avenue, just across Route 9W from one of the main access points. It can still house 5 guests. It also has a lawn for recreational activities, a tree and shrub nursery, weather station, storage barn and wood shop.

When the Consortium took over, it decided to build several facilities to allow education and research to take place in the forest itself, the first new construction in the forest since the 19th century. All are green buildings, in keeping with the forest's mission, that have won their architects some awards.

The main building is the Center for Science and Education, a 9,000-square foot (810 m^{2}) structure erected in 1999 with grants from the National Science Foundation, Kresge Foundation and other donors. It has a wet and dry laboratory, plus 1,150 square feet (104 m^{2}) of classrooms (with labs of their own) designed for levels from kindergarten through undergraduate. The 700-square foot (63 m^{2}) dry lab also has refrigerators, freezers, centrifuges, distilled water and a fume hood. Archived data from forest research and observation goes back to 1930 in some cases. Wired and wireless Internet access is available.

Next to the Center is the Forest Lodge, built in 2005 as the primary center for overnight stays in the Forest. Sixty people can spend the night here, sleeping four to eight to a room. A central Commons can accommodate 140 for lectures and 65 for meals prepared in the kitchen, and the deck offers a view of the surrounding mountains.

The third building in this main complex is the Solar Pavilion, on a small rise behind the Science Center. It is an unwalled shelter built of red pine harvested within the forest. It has 32 solar panels on its sloping, south-facing roof, which, when combined with 48 more on the Center for Science and Education, provided 26,000 kilowatt hours of electricity in their first 11 months of operation (about half the building's total demand). During daylight in summer, it can provide all the building's power. Underneath the roof are two large picnic tables and real-time monitors for the solar power system to allow the Pavilion's use as an outdoor classroom.

Away from this complex are two other buildings. The 1834 Chatfield Stone House, located along the Continental Road between Arthur's and Tamarack ponds, the only remaining structure from the area's past uses, was rebuilt after a 1912 fire and is now a museum. Its exhibits relate not only to the past human uses of the forest but to its natural history. Some educational programs are based here, and it too can be used for overnight stays (albeit without electricity or running water) with forest permission.

=== Programs and projects ===
The Consortium runs several regular programs and projects in conjunction with its member institutions. A small grants program, funded by the Ernst C. Stiefel Foundation, has been in place since 1990, continuing a similar practice of Harvard's. Teachers and researchers at member institutions are eligible for up to $3,000 for educational projects and $5,000 for research projects. By 2008, a total of $425,000 has been given out since then.

The School in the Forest program, funded initially by a grant from The New York Community Trust, brought students from urban public schools in New York City to the forest for day or overnight trips to get the same experience the Consortium's member schools and school districts enjoy for their students. P.S. 220 in the Mott Haven section of the Bronx and P.S/I.S 311 from Inwood, the northern tip of Manhattan Island, participated in 2004. The weekend of April 29, 2011, the Marine Biology Research Program of the Urban Assembly New York Harbor School headed to Black Rock Forest to take part in ecosystem ecology projects.

In the mid-1990s, Jean Gardner, a consortium consultant, began putting together a Virtual Forest Initiative, a new concept designed to take advantage of the possibilities of the then-emerging World Wide Web. It would not only allow visitors to take a "virtual hike" through the forest, it would also provide real-time data from the forest's environmental monitoring network to enhance appreciation of its ecological importance. In April 2004, a virtual hike with data was made available, in addition to the clickable map on the Consortium's website.

The first "Green Ride", a three-day, 260-mile (418 km) bicycling trip from Fort Tryon Park in Manhattan to the forest and back, was held in October 2007. It was successful in raising $60,000 for forest programs and will be held again in 2008.

=== Consortium member institutions and organizations ===
The following institutions have been or currently are members of the Black Rock Forest Consortium:

- American Museum of Natural History
- Avenues: The World School
- Barnard College
- The Browning School
- The Calhoun School
- Central Park Conservancy
- Columbia University
- Cornwall Central School District
- The Dalton School
- Metropolitan Montessori School
- New York - New Jersey Trail Conference
- New York University (Steinhardt School of Culture, Education and Human Development, and School of Arts and Sciences)
- Newburgh Enlarged City School District
- The School at Columbia University
- The Spence School
- Storm King School
- Trevor Day School
- Urban Assembly School for Applied Math and Science

== Access ==
Most access to Black Rock Forest comes from Route 9W to the east, where there are three separate parking areas along the southbound roadway of the divided highway. The main entrance and parking lot is on Reservoir Road near Storm King School and Cornwall-on-Hudson's Deer Hill section. From there it is 0.6 miles (0.97 km) via trail or 0.5 miles (0.80 km) road to the Center for Science and Education. 1 mile (1.6 km) north of that is the entrance opposite the old headquarters building on Continental Road, with more limited parking, and several miles to the south, just north of the USMA property, there is another small parking lot aside 9W.

Three other entry points exist. From the south, along NY 293 a mile south of Route 9W, a trail from the end of a short road leads from the military reservation into the forest. On the northwest side, there is another trailhead near the end of Mine Hill Road, a dead-end street off Angola Road, and finally there is the access from Old Mineral Springs Road at the western corner.

== See also ==
- Scenic Hudson Preservation Conference v. Federal Power Commission
