= Lengyel (disambiguation) =

Lengyel means "Pole" in Hungarian. The word may refer to:

- Lengyel, a village in Tolna County, Hungary
- Lengyel (surname)
- Lengyel culture, an archaeological culture
