= East Central Europe =

East Central Europe may refer to:

- East-Central Europe, a subregion of Europe
- East Central Europe (journal), an academic journal

== See also ==
- Central and Eastern Europe, a geopolitical term
