= Balašević =

Balašević (Serbian Cyrillic: Балашевић) is a Serbo-Croatian surname, a patronymic derived from the masculine given name Balaš (Hungarian: Balázs). It may refer to:

- Đorđe Balašević (1953–2021), Serbian singer-songwriter
- Predrag Balašević (born 1974), ethnic Romanian politician from Serbia
