= Fülei =

Fülei is a Hungarian surname. Notable people with the surname include:

- Balázs Fülei (born 1984), Hungarian classical pianist
- Endre Fülei-Szántó (lawyer) (1890–1958), Hungarian lawyer and professor
- Endre Fülei-Szántó (1924–1995), Hungarian linguist and writer
- Lajos Fülei-Szántó (1851–1910), Hungarian journalist and poet
