= Storm King School =

School in Cornwall-on-Hudson, New York, US

- Cornwall on Hudson, New York; United States

Information
- Type: Private, boarding
- Motto: Truth, Respect, Responsibility
- Established: 1867
- Head of School: Lisa Shambaugh
- Teaching staff: 43
- Grades: 8-12 and post-graduate
- Enrollment: 185 total
- Average class size: 10 students
- Student to teacher ratio: 5:1
- Campus: Rural, 55 acres (22 ha)
- Colors: Navy blue & white
- Nickname: Cougars
- Accreditation: NYSAIS
- National ranking: 36
- Test average: 32 (ACT); 1350 (SAT)
- Endowment: $4.5 million
- Website: www.sks.org

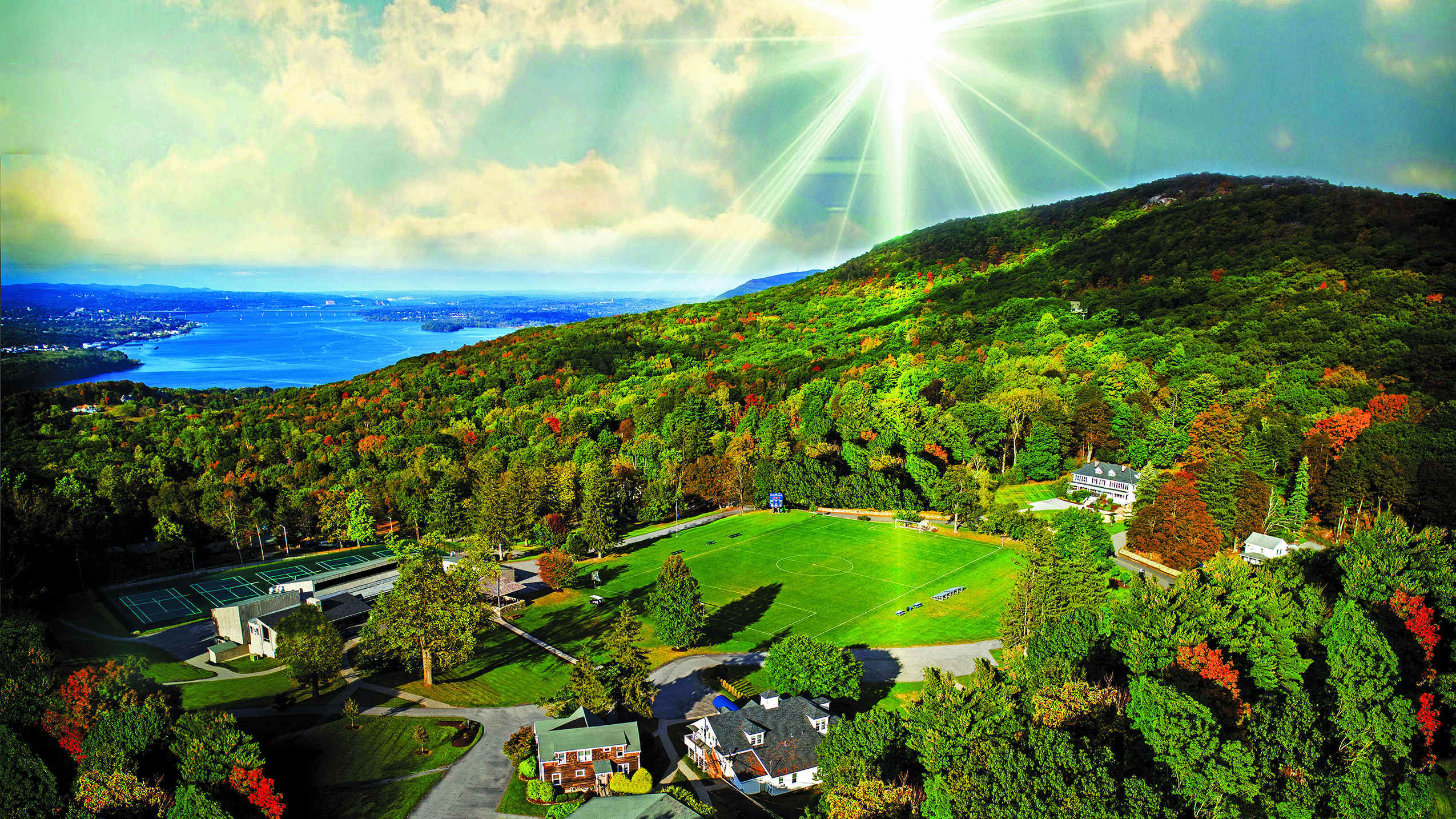
The Storm King School campus

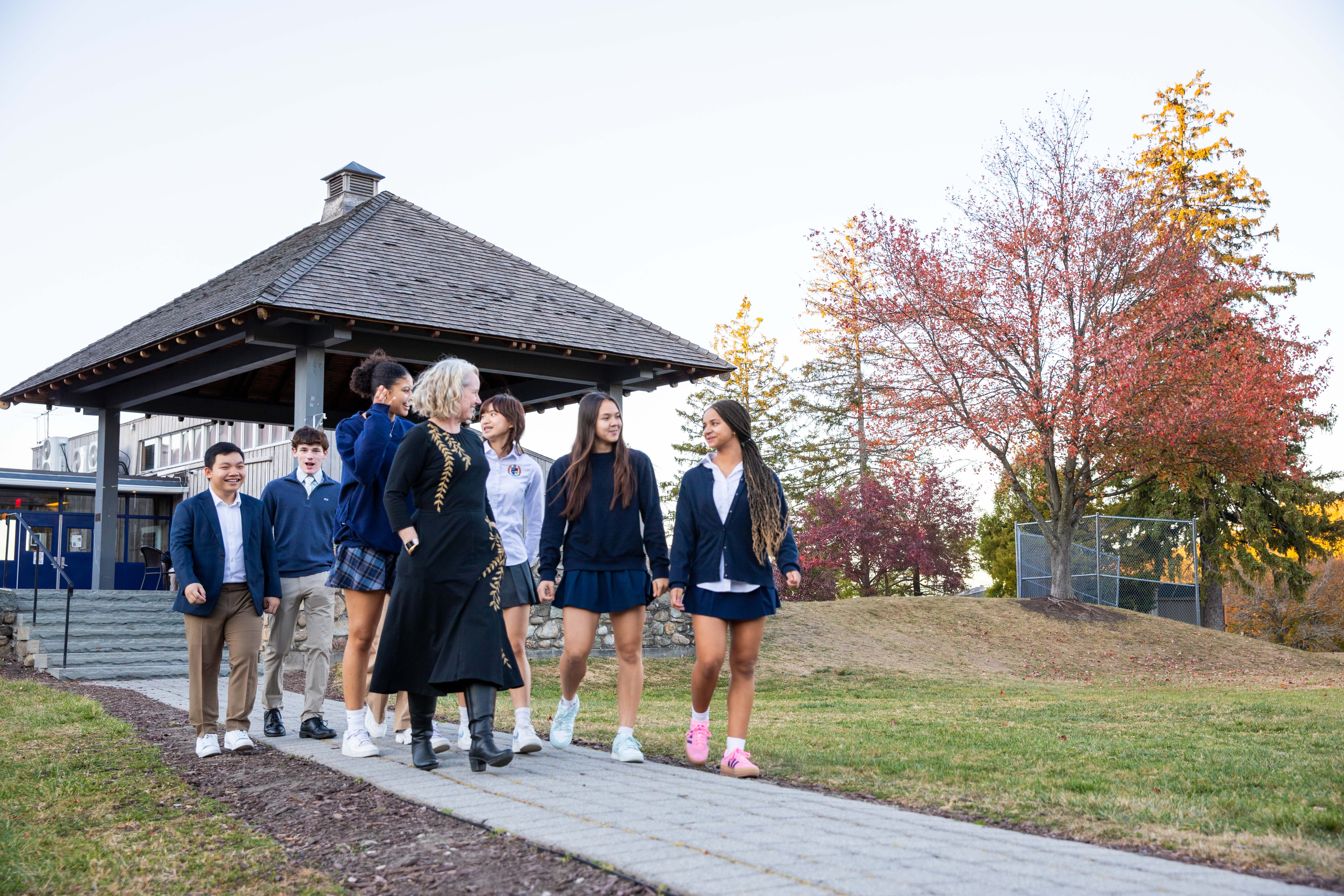
Head of School Lisa Shambaugh walking with students.

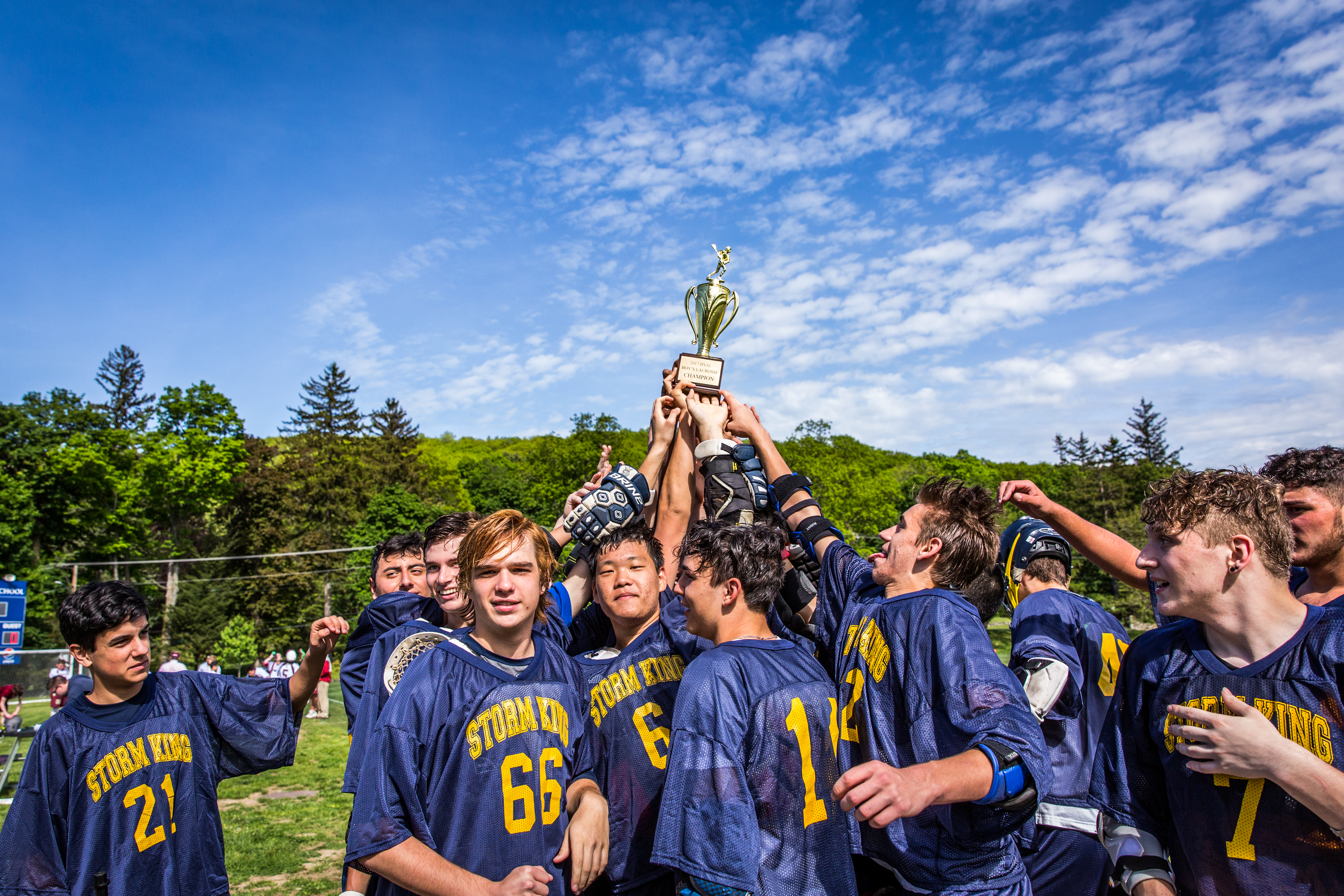
Storm King's Lacrosse team winning the league championship

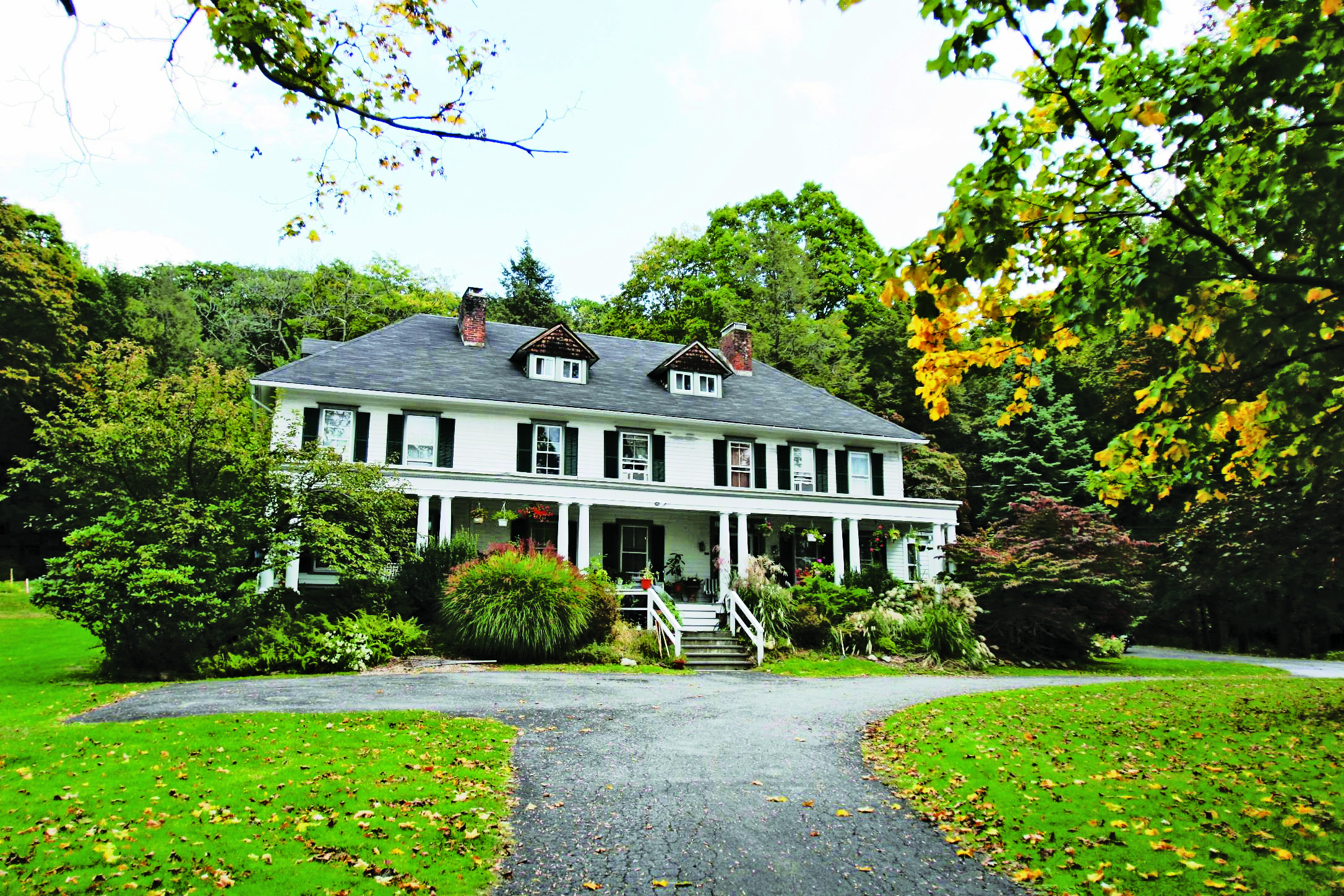
Spy Rock, one of six campus residences

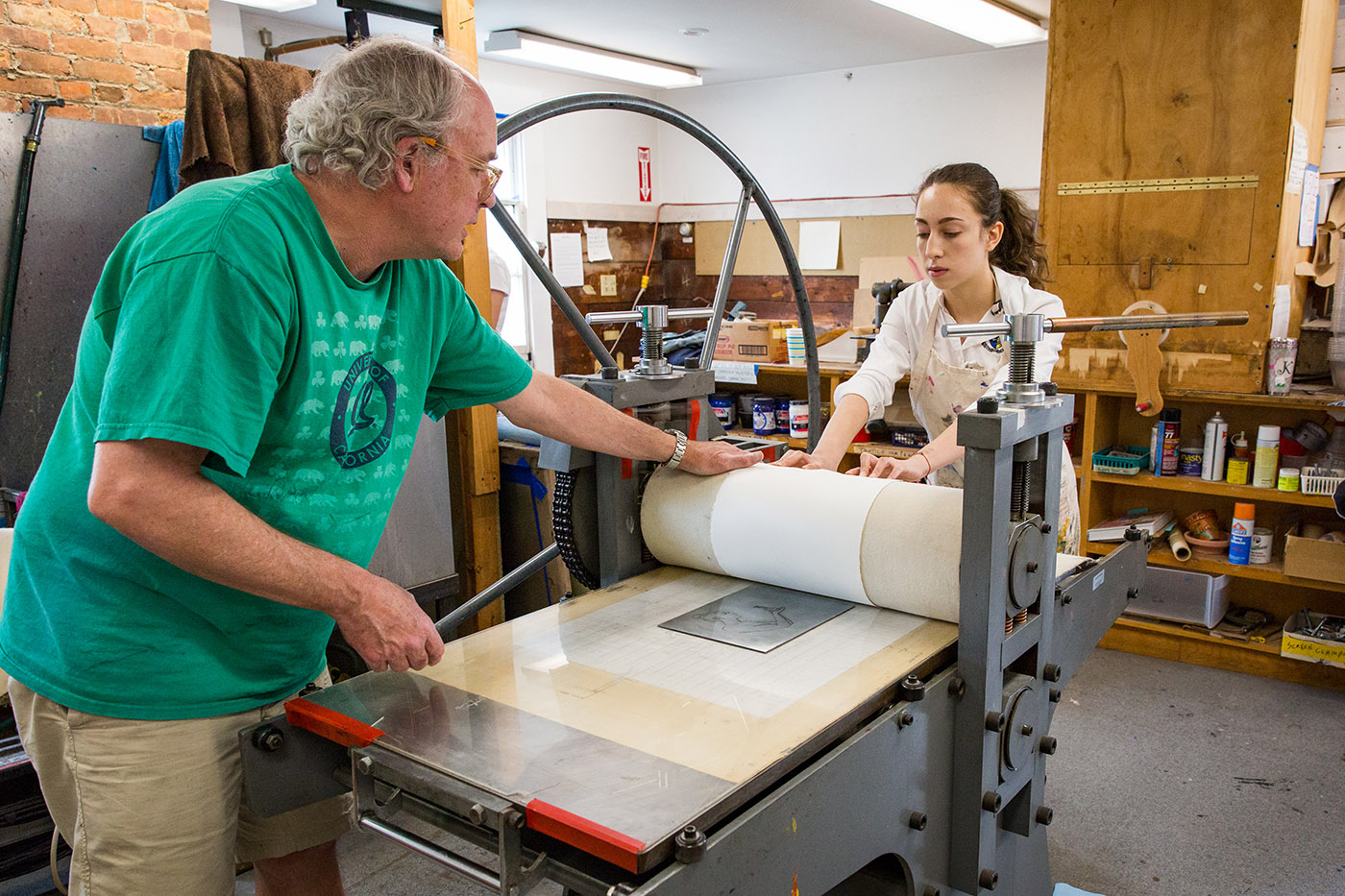
Students learning the art of printmaking

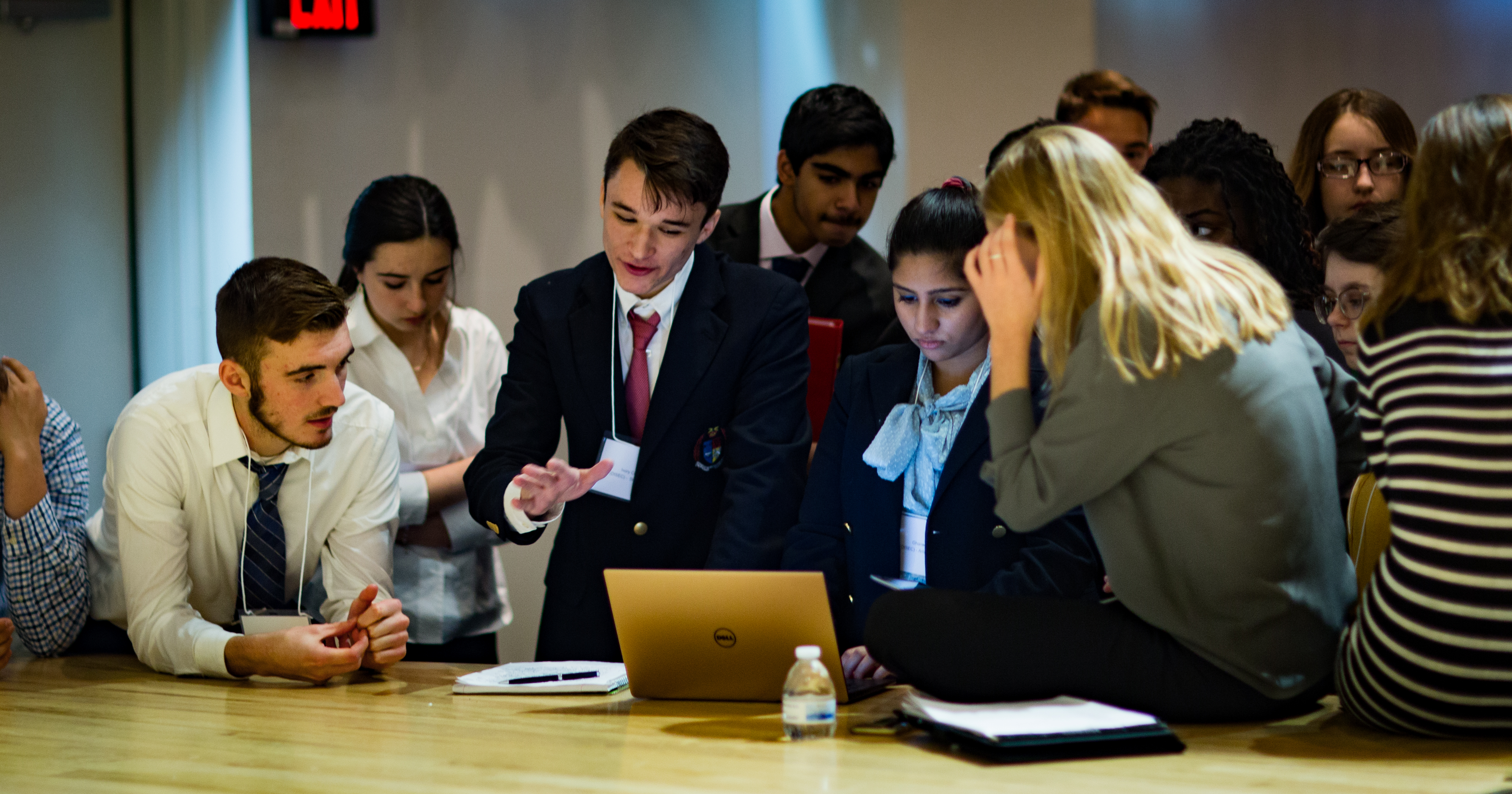
Storm King's Model United Nations team ranks among the best in North East.

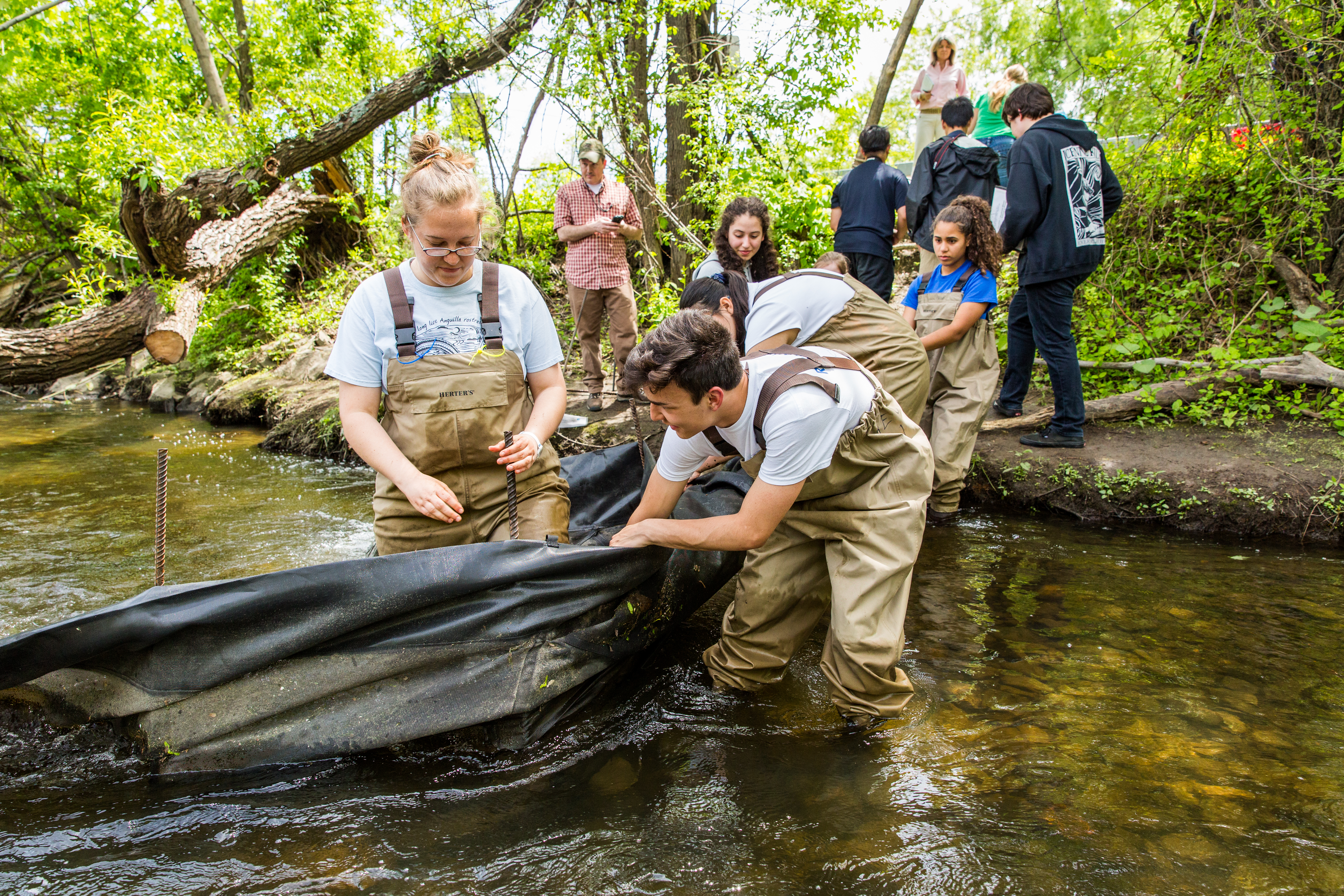
Students conducting eel research during the spring semester

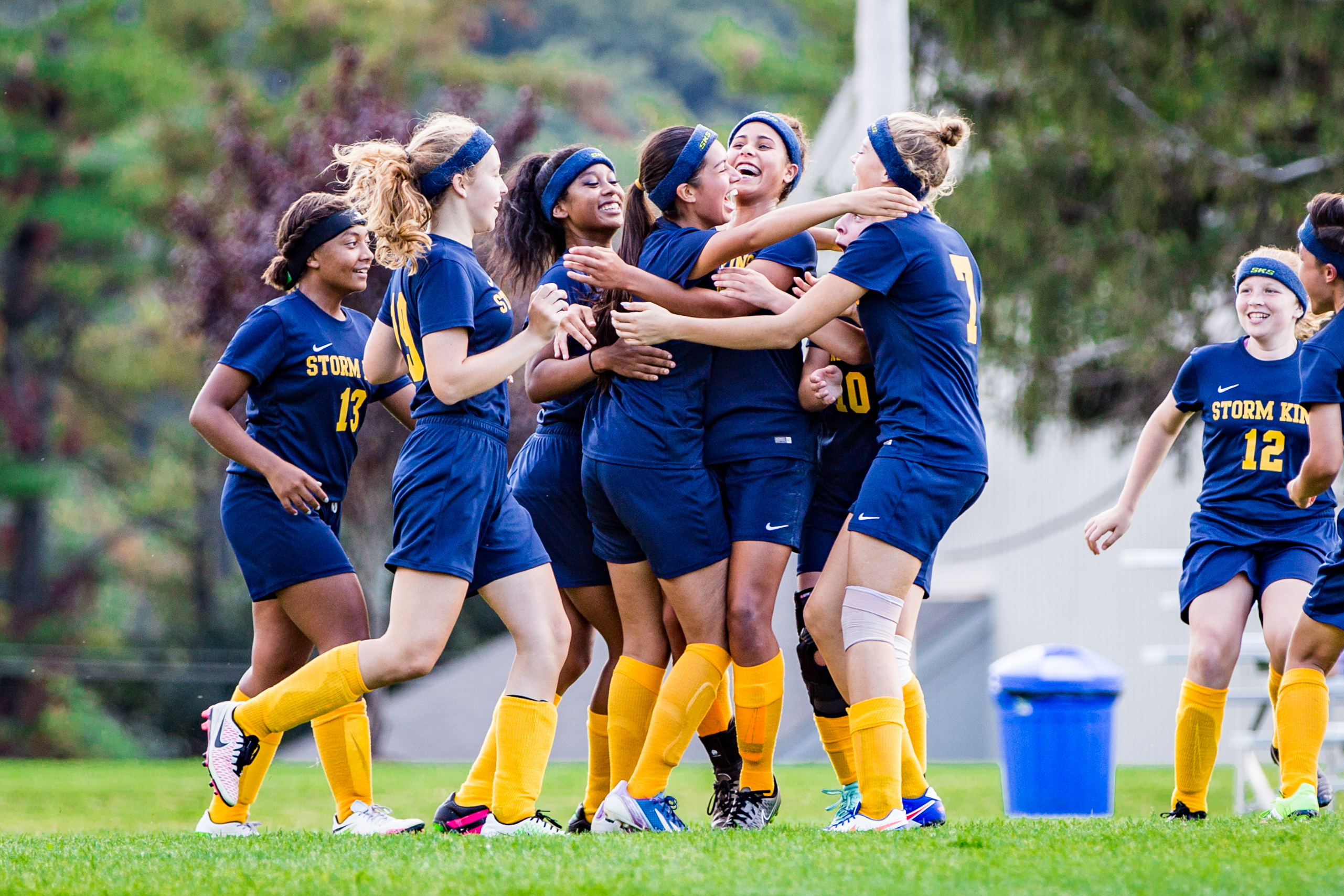
Girls' soccer program capturing the league title

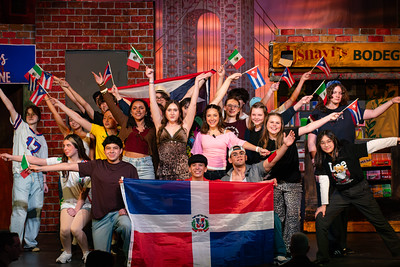
Student performances are held at the Walter Reade Jr. Theatre, with seating for 230 spectators.

The Storm King School (SKS) is an independent coeducational boarding and day school in Cornwall-on-Hudson, New York, United States. Established in 1867, it is one of New York's oldest boarding schools. It is a college preparatory school for students in grades 8 to post-graduate, with an enrollment of 185 and 37 faculty living on or near campus through the year.

The school enrolls students from 25 countries. Seventy-five percent of students are boarding, and 25% are day students. Fifty-three percent are male and 47% female.

The school is accredited by the New York Association of Independent Schools, and is a member of the New York State Association of Independent Schools, the National Association of Independent Schools, the College Board, and other education organizations.

A 15-member board of trustees governs the school.

== Location ==
The Storm King School is in Orange County, about an hour's drive north of New York City. It sits approximately 900 feet above the west bank of the Hudson River, on a spur of Storm King Mountain, with views of the Shawangunk Mountains and distant Catskills. It adjoins Black Rock Forest Nature Preserve to the south.

The school lies in the Hudson Valley between West Point and Newburgh. The nearby Storm King Art Center is an outdoor sculpture museum with work by world-class sculptors and artists.

== History ==
The Storm King School began in 1867 as the Cornwall Heights School. Louis P. Ledoux, a graduate of Amherst College and Union Theological Seminary, and a pastor of the Cornwall Presbyterian Church, founded the school after requests that he establish "a Christian school in the home of a Christian gentleman." Ledoux purchased Wood Farm on the northern slope of Storm King Mountain, where he prepared young men for New England colleges until 1872, when he sold his interest in the school to Oren S. Cobb.

Cobb was headmaster for 15 years until 1889, when the school was sold to Carlos H. Stone. During Stone's 29-year leadership, the school saw much growth, including increased enrollment and an enlarged physical plant. In 1914, the school was incorporated under New York State law and renamed the Stone School.

In 1923, during the tenure of headmaster Alvan P. Duerr, the school's name was changed to Storm King School. In 1928, the Board of Regents of the University of the State of New York chartered SKS as a tax-exempt educational institution.

From 1932 to 1951, throughout the austere years of the Depression and World War II, SKS was led by headmaster Anson Barker and benefited from the patronage and participation of several prominent families who lived on the mountain, including the Abbotts, Ledouxs, Matthiesens, Partridges, Smidts and Stillmans.

Margaret Clark, the school's first female teacher (primarily in art), retired in 1938 after over 40 years at SKS. Her design of the school's crest, initially created for the student publication The Echo, was later adopted as the school's official emblem.

During the 1950s and 1960s, the school saw considerable growth thanks in part to Stephen P. Duggan, an attorney and long-time member and chairman of the Board of Trustees who owned property adjacent to the school. He oversaw the rebuilding of SKS's then 44-acre campus, including construction of The Ogden Library (1958), Dyer Hall (1958), Highmount Dormitory (1958), Dempsey Dormitory (1959), Stillman Science Building (1960–61) and a new gymnasium (1963).

In 1967 the school celebrated its 100th anniversary. It was the culmination of a nearly decade-long modernization project championed by chairman Duggan and successive SKS headmasters Burke Boyce (1952–1956), Warren Leonard (1956–1966) and Frank Brogan (1966–1974). During centenary celebrations, ambassador-at-large Averell W. Harriman dedicated the new Walter Orr Student Commons.

In April 1968, the campus's 100-year-old Main Building, known as "Old Main", was demolished to make way for a new dormitory. Residents of Old Main moved into the new McConnell Hall in the spring of 1968.

The school became coeducational in September 1970.

In 1981, Rients and Suzanne Van der Woude of Cornwall gave the school 70 acres of land on Storm King Mountain, just west of the campus. Van der Woude said the land was given in order "to preserve it forever and so that children can learn about nature and ecology, and respect for life and earth." The gift expanded SKS's campus to 125 acres.

The Van der Woude property was part of a historic 17-year dispute between New York utility Consolidated Edison and the Scenic Hudson Preservation Conference, a group of concerned residents and citizens. In 1963, Con Ed planned a massive hydroelectric plant on Storm King Mountain which would have required cutting through the mountain and flooding the Black Rock Forest to create a reservoir. Due largely to opposition from the Preservation Conference, Con Ed's plan was abandoned and the suit settled in 1982.

From 1983 to 2014, The Storm King School underwent a period of institutional expansion under several headmasters. James T. Dowell (1983–1986) oversaw the school's participation as one of the 15 founding members of the Black Rock Forest Consortium in 1984, which preserved 3,800 acres of forest, and the dedication of the Walter Reade Jr. Theatre, funded by a gift from alumnus Walter Reade Jr. '35. Under John Suitor Jr. (1987–1997), the school added a new observatory and converted the Cobb House into the Allison Vladimir Art Center through a donation from Karl and Allison Soderlund, expanding its visual arts facilities, while Phillip Riley (1997–2004) presided over a period of athletic success that included NEPSAC boys' varsity basketball championships in 2000 and 2001 and a co-championship in boys' varsity soccer with Chase Collegiate School in 2003. Helen "Steevie" Chinitz became the school's first female head in 2004 and established the Mountain Center, the predecessor to the Academic Support Program, before being succeeded by Paul Domingue, who served from 2012 to 2014.

Jonathan W. R. Lamb succeeded Paul Domingue as Head of School in 2014. During his tenure, the school expanded its enrollment, academic programs, experiential learning opportunities, arts, athletics, and campus facilities, and announced plans for a new academic center focused on STEAM (science, technology, engineering, arts, and mathematics) education as part of its sesquicentennial celebration, which concluded in 2018. Lamb was succeeded by Lisa Shambaugh, who became the school's 18th Head of School in 2024. Upon assuming the role, she began work with the Board of Trustees on the development of a new strategic plan for the school, which outlines four pillars: Engage and Connect, Innovate and Elevate, Enhance and Expand, Invest and Sustain, including the construction of the Irving and Muriel Fischer Academic Center.

In 2026, The Storm King School built the Irving and Muriel Fischer Academic Center, intended to serve as the academic hub of its campus. The school held a groundbreaking ceremony on March 4, 2026, as part of its "Enduring Strength, Limitless Possibilities" strategic plan. Designed by John D. Fuller, P.E., P.C. of Port Jervis, New York, the building includes ten classrooms, collaborative learning and laboratory spaces, a faculty room, a courtyard, a terrace, and the Warren Leonard Lobby as a central gathering space. The center is named in recognition of a $1 million gift from alumnus and trustee Michael Fischer (class of 1982).

The Storm King School was ranked the 36th best boarding school in the United States in 2015.

== Signature programs ==
The Capstone Project is a voluntary, independent research project beginning in the spring of the junior year and completed in the fall of the senior year. It synthesizes learning from previously completed courses while focusing on the school's bedrock Skills and Knowledge for Success (S.K.S.).

Domestic & International Travel complements the School's academic curriculum and community service program.

== Co-curricular activities ==
The school requires students to participate in afternoon activities during each of its three athletic seasons, choosing among interscholastic athletics, the arts, outdoor education, and other programs. Athletics are organized through the Hudson Valley Athletic League and the New England Preparatory School Athletic Council (NEPSAC); the school fields teams at the varsity, junior varsity, and club levels across roughly 19 sports and activities.

Student organizations include Model United Nations, student government, a student newspaper, an outdoor and adventure program, and a range of clubs and affinity groups. Students are expected to complete community service annually, and the school schedules weekend trips to cultural and recreational sites in New York City and the surrounding Hudson Valley. Year-end recognition for participation is given at the school's Afternoon Activity Awards, which include the Pentagonal Award, presented since 1953 to graduating seniors who have competed in varsity athletics across five seasons.

== Arts ==
The Storm King School offers instruction in visual and performing arts as part of its curriculum. Course offerings include studio art, ceramics, photography, filmmaking, fashion design, acting, stagecraft, music, voice, and dance. Arts facilities include the 230-seat Walter Reade Jr. Theatre and the Allison Vladimir Art Center, the latter housing a digital design lab, a ceramics studio, and a 3D printer. Private music instruction is available to students. The school is a member of the New York State School Music Association.

== Athletics ==
The Storm King School has a full athletic curriculum and competes in the New England Prep School Athletic League and competes in 18 different sports and activities. Storm King fields 26 teams at the varsity, junior varsity, and club level and is a member of The Hudson Valley Athletic League (HVAL) and The New England Private School Athletic Council (NEPSAC). Storm King is a member of the Positive Coaching Alliance.

- Fall sports: boys and girls soccer, boys and girls cross country, girls volleyball
- Winter sports: boys and girls basketball, bowling, E-sports, fencing
- Spring sports: boys and girls lacrosse, baseball, boys volleyball, boys and girls tennis, mountain biking, Ultimate
- Club sports: yoga, rock climbing, bowling, fitness

== Residential life ==
About 70 percent of the school's students live on campus. A commuter rail station is a short drive away, and the Metro North train connects to Grand Central Terminal in less than one hour.

In 2026, the Storm King School enrolled students from 25 countries.

=== Black Rock Forest Consortium ===
The school is a member of the Black Rock Forest Consortium, which administers the Black Rock Forest, a 3,830-acre wilderness adjacent to the campus, which the school also utilizes for its science, environmental and recreational programs. The Head of School is a vice president and a member of the Executive Committee of the Consortium.

== Notable alumni ==
- Cara Castronuova (1998), boxer, two-time Golden Gloves winner, trainer on the NBC's The Biggest Loser
- Frederick Fox, designer
- Mac Gayden (1958), country music star, best known as writer of the song "Everlasting Love"
- Jack Hemingway (1941), writer, conservationist, son of Ernest Hemingway
- Sammy Mejia (2003), professional basketball player, 2nd-round draft pick by the Detroit Pistons
- David Parks (1969), photographer, film director, publicist and author
- Wally Pfister (1979), Academy Award-winning cinematographer and director
- Tom Price (1951), Olympic rower who competed for the U.S. at the 1952 Olympics
- Walter Reade Jr. (1935), president of the Walter Reade Organization, movie theater owner/operators and film distributors; namesake of the school's theater
- Gary Springer (1972), actor and publicist
- Balazs Szabo (1963), Hungarian-born artist and author
- Robert Torricelli (1970), former U.S. congressman and senator from New Jersey
- Whiting Willauer (1923), former U.S. ambassador to Honduras and founder of Civil Air Transport
- Steven Zirnkilton (1976), voice-over actor, known for providing the opening narration of all U.S. shows in the Law & Order franchise

== Notable faculty ==
- Burke Boyce (Headmaster 1952–1956), Olympic fencer, competed for the U.S. at the 1924 Olympics; an integral part of developing the school's fencing program, which continues to this day
