= Lengyel (surname) =

Lengyel is a Hungarian surname (meaning Pole). It may refer to:

- Árpád Lengyel (disambiguation):
  - Árpád Lengyel (swimmer) (1915–1993), Hungarian swimmer
  - Árpád Lengyel (physician) (1886–1940), Hungarian physician
- Balázs Lengyel, multiple people
- Béla Lengyel (born 1990), Hungarian footballer
- Cornel Lengyel (1914–2003), American poet
- Dániel Lengyel (born 1989), Hungarian footballer
- Eric Lengyel, Computer game engine developer
- Ernst Lengyel, American gynecologic oncologist
- Félix Lengyel (born 1995), Canadian Twitch streamer and Overwatch player
- Ferenc Lengyel (born 1966), Hungarian footballer
- Gabriella Lengyel (born 1960), Hungarian volleyball player
- Gyula Lengyel (1888–1938), Hungarian politician
- Gyula Lengyel (rowing) (born 1931), Hungarian rower
- Imre Lengyel (born 1977), Hungarian diver
- Jack Lengyel (born 1935), American football coach
- Joseph L. Lengyel (born 1959), United States Air Force officer
- Levente Lengyel (1933–2014), Hungarian chess player
- Mariana Lengyel (born 1953), Romanian discus thrower
- Melchior Lengyel (1880–1974), Hungarian writer
- Nándor Lengyel (1914–1968), Hungarian football manager
- Olga Lengyel (1908–2001), Hungarian author and Holocaust survivor
- Roman Lengyel (born 1978), Czech footballer
- Szilvia Lengyel (born 1971), Hungarian politician and engineer
- Theobald Lengyel, saxophone player and keyboardist for Mr. Bungle
- Zoltán Lengyel (born 1960), Hungarian politician
