= East Central Europe (journal) =

Academic journal

- Discipline: Area studies
- Language: English

Publication details
- Former name: East Central Europe/L’Europe du Centre-Est: Eine wissenschaftliche Zeitschrift (1974–2009)
- History: 1974–present
- Publisher: Brill Publishers (Netherlands) on behalf of the Central European University (Austria)
- Frequency: Triannually
- ISO 4: Find out here

Indexing
- ISSN: 0094-3037 (print); 1876-3308 (web)

Links
- Journal homepage

East Central Europe (ECE) is a peer-reviewed academic journal that covers the history, politics, culture and society of the region between the Baltic and the Adriatic, and has been published since 1974. It is issued three times a year by Brill Publishers in Leiden and is currently edited at the Central European University.

== History ==
The journal was founded in 1974 as East Central Europe/L’Europe du Centre-Est: Eine wissenschaftliche Zeitschrift, and its trilingual (English, French, and German) subtitle reflected an intention to serve an international scholarly readership. From its founding until 2008 it was edited and published by Charles Schlacks Jr., from Idyllwild, California, so for its first three and a half decades it was an independent, privately run scholarly periodical.

Since 2009 the journal has appeared under the shorter title East Central Europe and has been published by Brill. Since 2004 it has been issued under the auspices of Pasts, Inc. Center for Historical Studies at the Central European University. This marked a shift from an individually run enterprise to an institutionally anchored one in the region it studies. In 2018 the journal's current website moved to the Pasts, Inc. pages at the university, and the older site was kept as an archive of past issues.

== Scope and content ==
The journal publishes research articles, special thematic issues and book reviews. Several issues have appeared as special numbers with their own titles. Although it is rooted in historical scholarship, it is interdisciplinary and welcomes contributions from political science, sociology, literary and cultural studies, intellectual history and related fields. Its geographical focus is the area often called East Central Europe or Central Europe, which includes Poland, the Czech lands, Slovakia, Hungary, the Baltic states, the successor states of Yugoslavia, Romania and neighboring regions. The language of publication is now English, though earlier volumes also carried contributions in French, German, Italian and Russian.

== Editors ==
The journal is currently edited by Constantin Iordachi, Markian Prokopovych and Balázs Trencsényi, who is listed as editor-in-chief at the Central European University since 2005. Emily R. Gioielli serves as editor of book reviews. An international editorial board supports the editors.

== Abstracting and indexing ==
The journal is indexed in Web of Science, Scopus, and Emerging Sources Citation Index.
