= Balázs Szabó (disambiguation) =

Balázs Szabó (born 1985) is a Hungarian organist.

Balázs Szabó may also refer to:

- Balazs Szabo (1943–2022), Hungarian-American artist
- Balázs Szabó (footballer) (born 1995), Hungarian footballer
