= Woodbury Creek =

Stream in Freeborn and Mower County, Minnesota, U.S.

Coordinates: 43°32′28.68″N 93°2′44.88″W

Woodbury Creek is a stream in Freeborn and Mower Counties in the U.S. state of Minnesota.

Woodbury Creek was named after an early settler.

== See also ==
- List of rivers of Minnesota
