= Balázs Fülei =

Hungarian musician

Balázs Fülei (born 1984 in Kecskemét, Hungary), is a Hungarian pianist.

== Background ==
Fülei started to learn music at the age of eight, his first teacher was Katonáné Szabó Judit. In the Bartók Conservatory, Budapest, his professors were Gábor Eckhardt and Balázs Réti, then he made his diploma with honours at the Franz Liszt Academy of Music, Budapest, 2008 in György Nádor, Márta Gulyás and Balázs Réti's class. Balázs Fülei was an active participant in prof. Amadeus Webersinke, Florent Boffard, Ferenc Rados, Gábor Csalog, Norma Fischer, Zoltán Kocsis, Bertrand Ott, Jan Marisse Huizing, Jan Wijn, Boris Berman and György Kurtág's piano and chamber music courses. Balázs Fülei is living an active musical life as a concert pianist, he gave several concerts almost in every country in Europe, in China, Japan, Australia and in the United States. He was an artist of the International Miami Piano Festival, and the Ferruccio Busoni Festival. He won the 1st prize on the 10th Hungarian National Piano Competition, and in the Andor Földes Piano Competition of Liszt Academy of Music in 2003. He was the winner of the 43. "Arcangelo Speranza" International Piano Competition in Taranto Italy, May 2005, 3rd prize winner of the 25. International Piano Competition „Ettore Pozzoli” in Milan-Seregno in 2007. In 2007 Balázs Fülei got a special prize in the 13. International Tchaikovsky Competition in Moscow. He was selected twice to the New Masters On Tour by The International Holland Music Sessions in The Netherlands and played in 2007 in the Concertgebouw, Diligentia Den Haag and other capitals in Europe. He performed in a DVD recording in May 2006 in Tokyo, Japan with the ballades of Chopin and Liszt, then made his New York debut in Carnegie Hall, 2008. Balázs Fülei plays chamber and contemporary music many times, he played world prémieres of Hungarian composers. He is an artist of the Starlet Music Management.

"The young Hungarian pianist Balázs Fülei is characterized by a high degree of musical professionalism, his delicate and profound performance penetrates the very substance of music"

Jan Marisse Huizing - artistic director of The International Holland Music Sessions
