= Balázs Kiss =

Balázs Kiss may refer to:

- Balázs Kiss (hammer thrower), Hungarian hammer thrower
- Balázs Kiss (wrestler), Hungarian Greco-Roman wrestler
- Balázs Kiss (gymnast), Hungarian artistic gymnast
