= Attila F. Balázs =

Hungarian poet, writer, translator, editor, publisher (born: 1954)

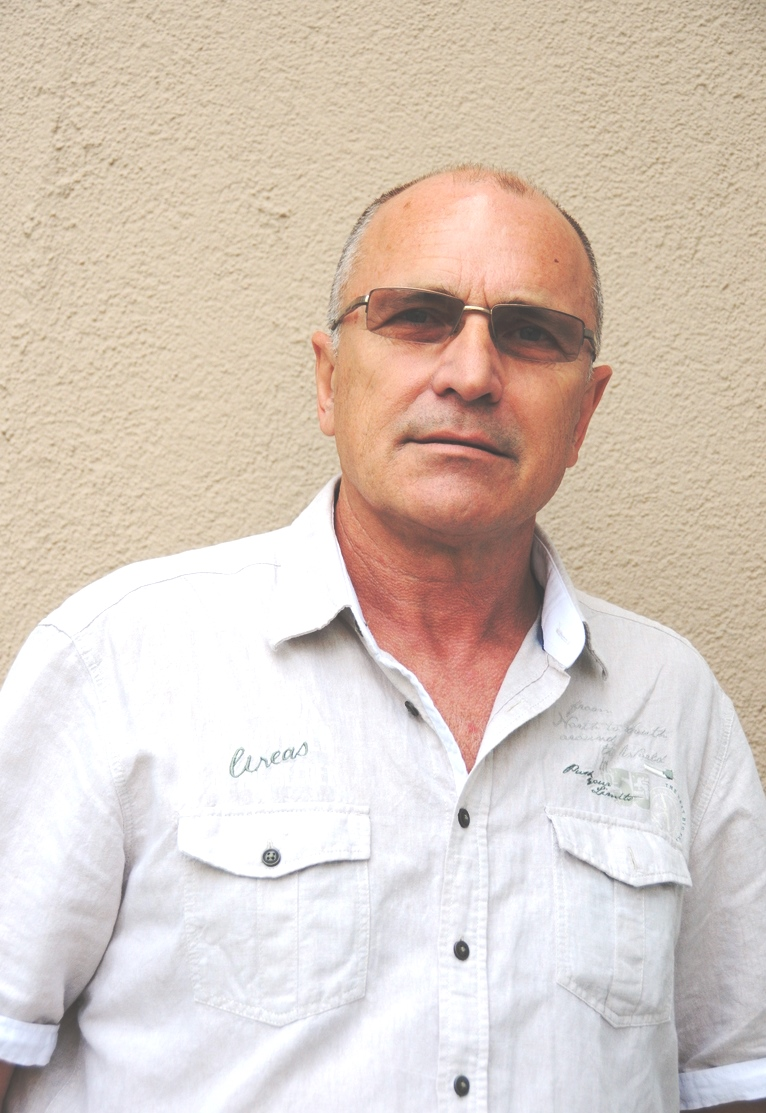
- Born: 15 January 1954; Târgu Mureș, Romania
- Occupations: poet, writer, translator, editor, publisher
- Writing career
- Period: 20th century, 21st century
- Genres: poetry, fiction
- Notable works: Villon nyakkendője (2015), Balázs F. Attila legszebb versei (2013), Kék (2011), Minimál (2010), Missa Bestialis (2008), Maszkok (1992)
- Notable awards: Opera Omnia Arghezi Prize (Târgu Jiu, Romania 2014), Translation Prize of the Eminescu Academy (Craiova, 2012), Lucian Blaga Prize (Romania, 2011), Lilla Prize (Hévíz, 2011), Freeman of Nandaime (Nicaragua, 2010), Madách Prize (Slovakia, 1992)

Attila F. Balázs (Târgu Mureș, 15 January 1954) is a poet, writer, translator, editor, and publisher.

== Life and work ==
Born in Târgu Mureș, he was a student of the high school of Ditrău (Mathematics-Physics). He continued his studies at the Institute of Catholic Theology in Alba Iulia. He graduated in Library science and Literary translation in Bucharest. He worked as a librarian at the Harghita County Library in Miercurea Ciuc until 1989. In 1990, he moved to Slovakia. Between 1990 and 1992 he was an editor of Szabad Újsag (Bratislava), collaborated to Új Szó and was the manager of the Madách Publishing House in Bratislava. In 1994, he founded AB-ART Publishing (Bratislava), of which he is the director since then. He is a founding editor of Poesis International Satu Mare and editor-in-chief of Szőrös Kő. He is a member of the Hungarian Writers' Union, of the Writers' Union of Romania, of the Hungarian PEN Club, of the Hungarian Writers' Association of Slovakia and of the League of Hungarian Writers of Transylvania. He is the vice-president of Dellart cultural association (Cluj-Napoca). As the author of more than a dozen collections of poetry and the translator of more than twenty books of poetry and fiction, Attila F. Balázs has received numerous awards and prizes in acknowledgement of his various literary activities (Madách Prize, Lucian Blaga Prize, Arghezi Prize). His works have been translated in 15 languages. As an invited poet, he is a regular participant of diverse literary festivals all around the world (Nicaragua, Colombia, Venezuela, Canada, Turkey, Ecuador).

== Bibliography ==
=== Poetry collections ===
- 1992 : Maszkok (poetry), Madách, Bratislava, Madách Prize.
- 1992 : A macska leve (short fiction), Microgramma, Bratislava.
- 2002 : Meztelen lovagok (poetry), AB-ART, Bratislava.
- 2003 : Arcképcsarnok (educational series on literature), AB-ART, Bratislava.
- 2005 : Szókeresztem (selected poetry), Lilium Aurum, Dunajská Streda.
- 2006 : Casanova átváltozásai – Premeny Casanovu (bilingual collection of poetry, Hungarian-Slovakian, Plectrum.
- 2007 : Kortárs román költők (trans., ed.)
- 2007 : Antologia sucasnej rumunskej poezie (trans.)
- 2008 : Menekülés a gettóból (translations), AB-ART, Bratislava.
- 2008 : Missa bestialis, Limes, Cluj-Napoca, 2008.
- 2009 : Egy zacskó cseresznye (Anthology of contemporary Romanian poetry), AB-ART, Bratislava.
- 2010 : Versek / Poezii. Bilingual edition (Hungarian-Romanian). Limes / Dellart.
- 2010 : Minimál (new poems), AB-ART, Bratislava.
- 2011 : KÉK (new poems), AB-ART, Bratislava.
- 2011 : Metamorfozele lui Casanova, translated by I. Foarta, Grinta, Cluj-Napoca.
- 2011 : Minimal, translated by Enikő Thiele-Csekei and Timo Berger, Gabrielle Schaefer Verlag, Herne.
- 2012 : Casanova átváltozásai, (short fiction) AB-ART, Bratislava.
- 2012 : The Scene, (poetry in 12 languages), Orient-Occident, Bucharest.
- 2012 : Prelomljeni hleb, (poetry in Serbian, translated by Jolanka Kováč), Libertatea, Pančevo.
- 2012 : Gordiev Jazol, (poetry in Macedonian, translated by D. Dimov), Matica, Skopje.
- 2013 : Legszebb versei, (selected poetry, afterword by Csaba András Sűtő), AB-ART, Bratislava.
- 2013 : Minimal (poetry in Portuguese, translated by José Eduardo), Editora Aty, Porto Alegre, Brazil.
- 2013 : Casanova's Metamorphoses (translated by Adrian George Sahlean), Ekstasis Editions, Vancouver, Canada.
- 2014 : Cravata lui Villon, (poetry in Romanian, translation by Serban Foarţă, foreword by Gheorghe Grigurcu, Tipo, Moldavia.
- 2014 : Luna pe cale de a se ȋneca, short fiction, translated by Foarţă Gábos Ildiko, essay by Nicolae Coande, ARC, Chișinău.
- 2014 : La metamorfosis de Casanova, Spanish translation by Rafael Soler, El Quirófano Ediciones, Colombia.
- 2014 : Blue/Kék, English translation by Elizabeth Csicsery-Rónay, Libros Libertad, Vancouver, Canada.
- 2015 : Метаморфозе Казанове, short fiction in Serbian, translation by Jolánka Kovács, Sremska Mitrovica.
- 2015 : Missa Bestialis, poetry in English, translation by Lucia Gorea, Libros Libertad, Vancouver, Canada.
- 2015 : Villon nyakkendője, poetry, Art Danubius.
- 2016 : Chair impassible, poetry in French, translation and foreword by Károly Sándor Pallai, Éditions du Cygne, Paris, France.

=== Translations ===
- 2007 : Kortárs román költők, AB-ART, Bratislava.
- 2009 : Varujan Vosganian, Kék sámán (Şamanul albastru), AB-ART, Bratislava.
- 2009 : Gabriel Chifu, Táblajáték (Jocul de table). Translation by Balázs F. Attila and François Bréda, AB-ART, Bratislava.
- 2009 : Mircea Petean, Anna versek (Poemele Anei), AB-ART, Bratislava.
- 2009 : Angela Baciu, Poezii / Versek, Limes /AB-ART.
- 2009 : Mircea Petean, Poezii / Versek, Limes, Cluj-Napoca.
- 2011 : Vasile Dan, Folyékony tükör poetry, AB-ART.
- 2011 : Lucian Blaga, Poezii / Versek, Nemzeti Tankönyvkiadó, Budapest.
- 2012 : Ioan Es Pop, Nem mertem kiáltani soha, AB-ART.
- 2012 : Robert Serban, Illatos koporsó, poetry, L'Harmattan, Budapest.
- 2012 : Carolina Ilica, Valamivel több, poetry, AB-ART.
- 2012 : Rade Siljan, Évszázadok, poetry, AB-ART.
- 2013 : Rafael Soler, Visszaút / Maneras de volver, poetry (bilingual edition) AB-ART.
- 2013 : José Eduardo Degrazia, A szerelem geometriája, poetry, AB-ART.
- 2014 : Turczi István, Strainul, poetry, Europa, Craiova.
- 2014 : Új Dánia, Anthology of Moldavian poetry, Parnasszus, Budapest.
- 2014 : Augusto Rodriguez, Örültek csókja, poetry, AB-ART.
- 2015 : Nedeljko Terzic, Robaj és csend, poetry, AB-ART.
- 2015 : Metin Cengiz, Fekete és fehér, poetry, AB-ART.
- 2015 : Müesser Yeniay, A rózsaszedés szertartása, poetry, AB-ART.

=== Anthologies ===
- 1978 : Kimaradt Szó, Kriterion, Bucharest.
- 1980 : Ötödik Évszak, Târgu Mureș.
- 1999 : Vámbéry Antológia, Lilium Aurum, Dunajská Streda.
- 2006 : Vámbéry Antológia, Lilium Aurum, Dunajská Streda.
- 2006 : Szlovákiai magyar szép versek, SZMIT, Dunajská Streda.
- 2007 : Szlovákiai magyar szép irodalom, SZMIT, Dunajská Streda.
- 2008 : Tahle ctvrt je nase, Mezera, Praga /AB-ART, Bratislava.
- 2008 : Szlovákiai magyar szép irodalom, SZMIT, Dunajská Streda.
- 2009 : Pesniki čakajoči na angela, Apokalips, Ljubljana.
- 2009 : Vámbéry Antológia, Lilium Aurum, Dunajská Streda.
- 2010 : Vámbéry Antológia, Lilium Aurum, Dunajská Streda.
- 2010 : Festival Internacional de Poesia, Granada, Nicaragua.
- 2011 : Szlovákiai magyar szép irodalom, SZMIT, Dunajská Streda.
- 2011 : Meridian Blaga, Asociatia Blaga, Cluj-Napoca.
- 2011 : Struga, home of poetry, Struga.
- 2011 : Vámbéry Antológia, Lilium Aurum, Dunajská Streda.
- 2012 : Poesys 16, Time for Poetry, Bucharest.
- 2012 : Vámbéry Antológia 2012, Lilium Aurum, Dunajská Streda.
- 2012 : International PEN Multilingual Anthology, AB-ART.
- 2013 : Three Poems from Europe, Editura Pelerin, Bucharest.
- 2013 : Al salir de la cárcel, Edifsa, Salamanca.
- 2013 : Szlovákiai magyar szépirodalom, SZMÍT.
- 2013 : Vámbéry Antológia, Lilium Aurum, Dunajská Streda.
- 2013 : Del teatro del silencio al parnasso, Tegucigalpa, Honduras.
- 2014 : Poems for the Hazara: A Multilingual Poetry Anthology by 125 Poets from 68 Countries, Full Page Publishing, New York-Oslo.
