= Balázs Csákabonyi =

Hungarian politician, lawyer, and educator (1936–2020)

Member of the National Assembly
- In office 28 June 1994 – 13 May 2010

Personal details
- Born: 3 December 1936 Eger, Hungary
- Died: 26 March 2020 (aged 83) Kaposvár, Hungary
- Party: MSZMP (1961–89); MSZP
- Profession: politician, lawyer, educator

Dr. Balázs Csákabonyi (3 December 1936 – 26 March 2020) was a Hungarian lawyer, educator and politician, member of the National Assembly (MP) from 1994 to 2010. He represented Kaposvár (Somogy County Constituency I) between 1994 and 1998. Thereafter he was an MP via the national list of the Hungarian Socialist Party (MSZP) from 1998.

== Career ==
Csákabonyi was born in Eger on 3 December 1936 as one of the four children of archivist Kálmán Csákabonyi (1902–1970), the head of the Békés County Archives, and teacher Áriás Ilona (1902–1990), who came from a Transylvanian medium landowner noble family. Csákabonyi finished his elementary and secondary studies in Gyula. He earned a teaching qualification in 1955. He taught at the local elementary school of Gerla (present-day part of Békéscsaba) from 1955 to 1958. Thereafter, he moved to Somogy County. He worked for the house of culture at Balatonboglár from 1958 to 1961, then he was employed by the district council of Nagyatád between 1961 and 1965. He worked for the council of Somogy County at Kaposvár from 1965 to 1971.

He studied law at the Janus Pannonius University (today University of Pécs) from 1965; he earned a correspondence degree of jurist in 1970. He was a trainee lawyer since 1971 at the 2nd lawyer community work at Kaposvár. He passed the bar exam in 1972. He worked as a private lawyer since 1991. He served as President of the Somogy County Bar Association from 1988 to 1997. He also functioned as High Commissioner for Discipline of the nationwide Hungarian Bar Association since 1992.

Csákabonyi joined Hungarian Socialist Workers' Party (MSZMP) in 1961. He was a member of the ruling Communist Party until its dissolution in 1989. He successfully ran as an individual candidate of the legal successor Hungarian Socialist Party (MSZP) in Kaposvár constituency during the 1994 parliamentary election. He was a vice-chairman of the Committee on Constitutional Affairs, Legislative Assembly, Justice and Rules of Procedure from 1994 to 1998. He was also a member of the Constitutional Preparatory Committee from 1995 to 1998, which, however, did not present a new constitution draft in that parliamentary session. Csákabonyi was elected MP via his party's national list in 1998, 2002 and 2006 elections. He retained his membership at the Committee on Constitutional Affairs and Justice. Csákabonyi was also a member and vice-president of the National Association of Hungarian Pensioners (MNYOSZ) and in this capacity, he represented the pensioners' interests in the National Assembly. He also acted as charge d'affaires of private law within the MSZP parliamentary group. Csákabonyi retired from politics and did not run in the 2010 parliamentary election.

== Personal life ==
Csákabonyi married teacher Márta Somosi in 1962. They had two children, lawyer Nárcisz (b. 1962) and trainee lawyer Balázs Rómeó (1966–1991), who was killed in a traffic collision. Balázs Csákabonyi died on 26 March 2020 in Kaposvár, at the age of 83.
