= Ernst Lengyel =

American gynecologic oncologist

- Born: Germany

Academic background
- Education: MD, 1992, LMU Munich.
- Thesis: Prognosekriterien des Mammakarzinoms am Beispiel der Keratine und des Onkogenproduktes HER2/neu (1993)

Ernst Robert Lengyel is an American gynecologic oncologist. Lengyel is the Arthur L. and Lee G. Herbst Professor of Obstetrics and Gynecology at the University of Chicago. Lengyel directs the Ovarian Cancer Research Laboratory, a translational research laboratory focused on understanding ovarian cancer metastasis and on developing and testing new treatments for ovarian cancer. In this role, Lengyel and his research team investigate the role of metabolism in ovarian cancer metastasis and the role of the fallopian tube in the development of ovarian cancer as the cells more closely resemble those in the fallopian tube rather than the ovary.

== Early life and education ==
Lengyel studied for 2 years at the University of Erlangen Medical School and then completed his medical degree at LMU Munich. He did his internship at LMU Munich in the Department of Obstetrics & Gynecology. This was followed by research at the MD Anderson Cancer Center in the Department of Tumor Biology under the guidance of Douglas Boyd, Ph.D. After returning to Munich he completed his residency in OB&GYN at the Technical University of Munich in the hospital of the Technical University under the guidance of Professor Henner Graeff, a leading expert in tumor protease biology.

He eventually moved to the United States and enrolled at the University of California San Francisco and Stanford University Medical Center for a three-year fellowship in Gynecologic Oncology.

== Career ==
Upon completing his fellowship program and a short stint as a attending physician at UCSF in 2004, Lengyel joined the University of Chicago faculty as a translational research scientist and clinician. Upon joining the Department of Obstetrics and Gynecology, Lengyel and Hilary Kenny began directing the Ovarian Cancer Research Laboratory. As co-directors, they were the first to culture metastatic ovarian cancer cells in a three-dimensional environment. In 2008, Lengyel was the recipient of a Burroughs Wellcome Fund Clinical Scientist Award in Translational Research for his project "Development of novel therapeutic and diagnostic strategies for ovarian cancer."

In 2013, Lengyel succeeded Arthur Haney as chair of the Department of Obstetrics and Gynecology. In this role, Lengyel and Kenny won a CBC HTS Award for their project "HTS Using an Organotypic Culture of Ovarian Cancer Metastasis." The aim of the project was to "test whether a 3D culture system developed in Lengyel's lab to mimic the in vivo tumor microenvironment could be utilized to screen for compounds inhibiting ovarian cancer cells metastatic properties such as adhesion, invasion and proliferation/growth". Later, Lengyel was the first author on a study which developed a new screening tool to speed development of ovarian cancer drugs. His study, published in Nature Communications, was the first to describe a high-throughput screening drug-discovery platform for ovarian cancer that mimics the structural organization and function of human tissue.

As a Professor and Chairman of the Department of Obstetrics and Gynecology, Lengyel and his research team continued to investigate the role of the fallopian tube in ovarian cancer as the cells more closely resemble those in the fallopian tube rather than the ovary. They described a new treatment in stroma which could prevent the rapid spread of high-grade serous carcinoma. He also served on the editorial board for the Gynecologic Oncology journal. In 2019, Lengyel and his research team described a new treatment using stroma which could prevent the rapid spread of high-grade serous carcinoma. To reach this conclusion, the researchers profiled the expression of more than 5,000 proteins in both normal and cancerous tissues derived from minute amounts of patient biobank material. They also discovered in a study published in Nature that nicotinamide N-methyltransferase (NNMT) was highly expressed in the stroma surrounding metastatic cancer cells. In 2025 they published a second Nature paper describing that overexpression of NNMT in cancer-associated fibroblasts regulates myeloid-derived suppressor cells thereby inhibiting immune function.

Lengyel was the recipient of the Chan Zuckerberg Initiative grant to define every cell type in the female reproductive tract. He received in 2021 an R35 Outstanding Investigator Award from the National Cancer Institute. In 2019 he was elected a Member of the National Academy of Medicine for his outstanding scientific and professional achievement in biology, medicine and related fields. He was elected 2021 to the Association of American Physicians (AAP). His clinical expertise is the surgical treatment of advanced ovarian cancer.
