= Balázs Balogh =

Balázs Balogh may refer to:

- Balázs Balogh (footballer, born 1982), Hungarian football defender for FC Ilves
- Balázs Balogh (footballer, born 1990), Hungarian football midfielder for Puskás Akadémia
