= Gábor Csalog =

Hungarian pianist

Gábor Csalog (born 1960 in Budapest) is a Hungarian pianist.

He was trained at the Ferenc Liszt Academy, and completed studies under György Sebők at Indiana University. He was prized at the 1986 Ferenc Liszt Competition.

Csalog, known for his work on Hungarian contemporary music, has recorded for Budapest Music Records since the '90s. His recordings include Étrangeté / Strangeness Alexander Scriabin: Preludes and Poems (Budapest Music Center Records, 2005). He is a teacher at the Liszt Academy and the Béla Bartók Conservatory, and currently works on an Urtext edition of Fryderyk Chopin's complete works for Könemann Music Budapest.
