= George H. Balazs =

Sea turtle biologist and researcher

George Harvey Balazs is an American sea turtle scientist who worked at the National Oceanic and Atmospheric Administration (NOAA) for almost half a century. Balazs began his studies in 1969 after witnessing the commercial harvesting of Hawaiian green sea turtles. He used his research to educate the public as well as Hawaii state legislators, eventually leading to a State ban on the commercialization of sea turtles. Formally retired since 2018, he continues to participate in sea turtle research and symposia.

== Early life ==
Balazs spent his childhood in the Mojave Desert, and his initial college career in San Diego before transferring to Los Angeles. Originally planning to become residents of Tahiti, Balazs and his family moved to Hawaiʻi in 1965. Balazs then studied at the University of Hawaiʻi at Mānoa from 1965 to 1969, receiving a BS and MS in Animal Science.

== Career ==
His contribution to the conservation of sea turtles began in Hawaiʻi in 1972, where he disputed a 1971 report that provided an incorrect number of nesting turtles. While the report stated that 5,200 turtles were tagged, it was assumed that it consisted of primarily nesting turtles however, Balazs noted that there were only around 15 nesting turtles. The lack of nesting females, combined with the over-consumption of turtles (honu) due to tourism, contributed to their endangerment.

Concerned that populations were diminishing, Balazs camped at French Frigate Shoals in the Northwestern Hawaiian Islands in 1973 where he documented their behaviors and life cycle. Based on this data, Balazs was able to assist with legislation that initiated a statewide ban on commercial harvesting of sea turtles in 1975. Soon after, in 1978, the Hawaiian sea green turtle was listed under the federal Endangered Species Act.

While Balazs served as the leader of the Marine Turtle Research Program in 2005, he launched a "show turtle aloha" campaign specifically for the Laniakea Beach located on the North Shore of Oahu. Laniakea Beach began to attract large crowds of tourists who would hover, feed, and touch the Hawaiian sea turtles. These sorts of interactions started to affect turtles' behaviors where incidents of nipping and biting occurred. Balazs and staff took the opportunity to monitor the Hawaiian sea turtles and educate visitors.

Balazs has authored or contributed to over 200 scientific papers. He was also appointed as the Chief Scientist of Turtle Conservation for the Shenzhen Institute of Guangdong Ocean University.

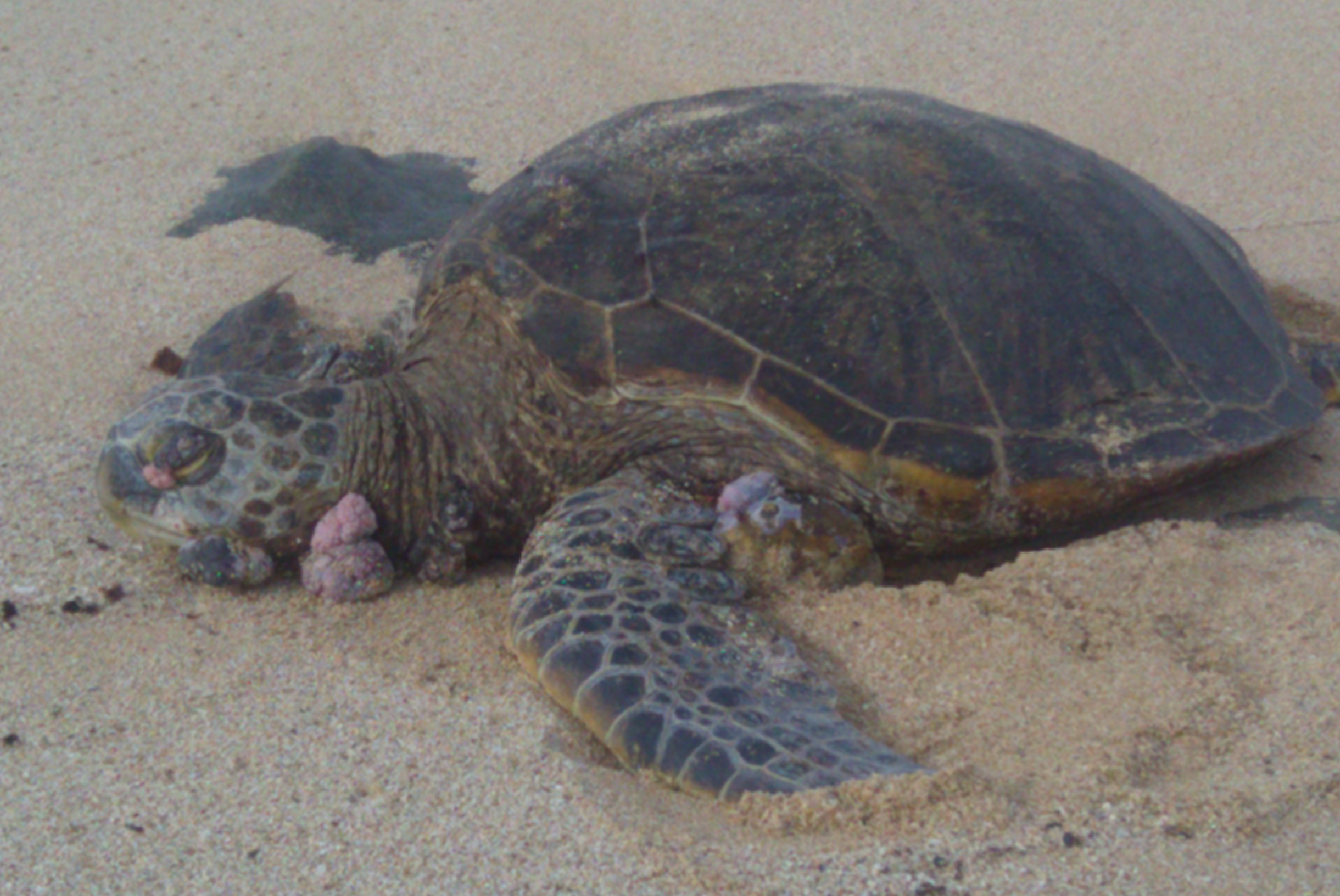
Green Turtle with fibropapillomatosis

A major threat to several sea turtles is a tumor-inducing disease known as fibropapillomatosis. Tumors form on their necks, eyes, and flippers, and occasionally, in their mouths and throats.

Balazs first observed tumor-afflicted turtles in 1974 in the French Frigate Shoals, where it had affected approximately 10% of the population. John Naughton of the National Marine Fisheries Service (NMFS) provided photographic evidence of tumors on Hawaiian turtles as early as 1958. Given an increase in strandings of Hawaiian green sea turtles with tumors in the 1980s, it became the main priority for Balazs and the Hawaiian Sea Turtle Recovery Team to discover their cause. There were many Hawaiian green sea turtles with tumors on their necks, eyes, and flipper. Occasionally, tumors would be detected in their mouths or throats.

Balazs theorized that these tumors could possibly result from blood flukes or internal parasites. With Richard Wass, a fisheries scientist who also examined these tumors at the Kewalo Basin Research Facility, Balazs further postulated that the cause of tumors might be tied to the green sea turtleʻs diet, as it had been reported that carnivorous sea turtle species rarely showed cases of tumors. Jan Landsberg postulated that toxic dinoflagellate Prorocentrum spp., present on algae, could be correlated with fibropapillomas. Balazs and Landsberg's study revealed that areas with the most fibropapillomas-affected honu had the most Prorocentrum. In the early 1990s, this hypothesis was updated to focus on Lyngbya; however, this was not supported by samples taken from Hawaii populations. After many years of study, herpesvirus (ChHV5) has been identified as the likely etiological agent causing fibropapillomatosis.

Fibropapillomas continued to appear and spread, affecting many sea turtles across the globe. Balazs reported the statistics and effects of fibropapillomas at the Sixth Annual Workshop on Sea Turtle Biology and Conservation in 1986. Balazs and Robert Morris had experimented with cryosurgery as a means to treat fibropapillomas— however, the tumors were only affected superficially; the cause of the tumors persisted. Prevalence of tumors in Hawaiian green sea turtle peaked in 1995, and has continuously declined since then.

== Awards ==
Balazs has received a number of awards during his career, including:

- Bronze Medal, NOAA, Department of Commerce (1994 & 2010)
- NOAA Employee of the Year Award (2001)
- National Conservation Special Achievement Award (2004)
- National Conservation Achievement or Leadership in Conservation (2005)
- Hawaii County Council Sea Turtle Scientific Contributions Award (2008)
- Office of Hawaiian Affairs Award for Research and Restoration of Sea Turtles (2008)
- Kay Gray Award of the British Caledonia Group (2011)
- ISTS Lifetime Achievement Award (2012)
- NOAA 30-year Service Award (2013)
