= Balázs Tóth =

Balázs Tóth may refer to:

- Balázs Tóth (footballer, born 1980), Hungarian former football defender
- Balázs Tóth (footballer, born 1981), Hungarian former football midfielder
- Balázs Tóth (footballer, born 1997), Hungarian football goalkeeper for Blackburn Rovers
- Balázs Tóth (footballer, born 2004), Hungarian football goalkeeper for Nyíregyháza and Diósgyőr
- Balázs Tóth (gymnast) (born 1967), Hungarian Olympic gymnast
- Balázs Tóth B. (born 1986), Hungarian footballer
