= The School at Columbia University =

Coordinates: 40°48′13.4″N 73°57′59.3″W

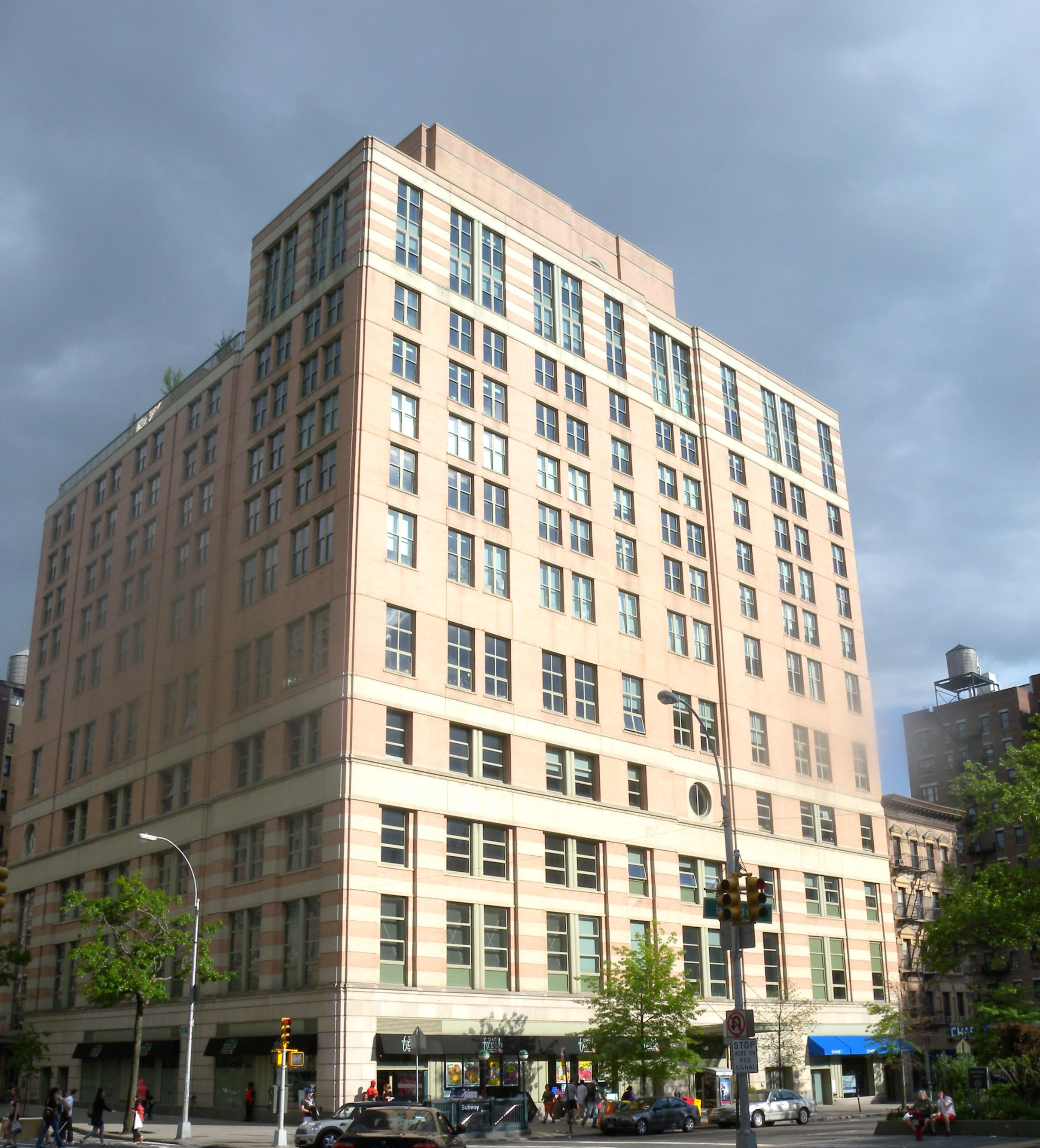
- TSC seen from Broadway

Location
- 556 West 110th Street, New York, NY 10025; New York City, New York, Manhattan; United States

Information
- Type: Coeducational Private
- Established: 2003
- Status: Open, in hybrid learning.
- Chief Operating Officer: Kevin Fittinghoff
- Head of School: Sonya Somerville
- Division Directors: Aletha Haynes (K–2), Rachel Klem (3–5), Jason Singleton (6–8)
- Grades: K–8
- Enrollment: approx. 500
- Campus: Urban
- Colors: Sky Blue, Navy Blue, White
- Mascot: Leo the Lion
- Nickname: TSC or The School
- Newspaper: The New Roar Times
- Affiliation: Columbia University
- Website: Official website

The School at Columbia University, also called TSC or The School, is a private K–8 school affiliated with Columbia University. Students are drawn equally from the Morningside Heights, Manhattan/Upper West Side/Harlem community and from the faculty and staff of the university. Currently there are three divisions: Primary (K–2), Intermediate (3–5) and Middle (6–8). Each division has its own Division Head and there is one Head of School. It is located at 110th Street and Broadway in the New York City borough of Manhattan.

== History ==
In 2000, Columbia University decided to develop a school that would serve the needs of its faculty and would also serve the community. The 13-story site (a mixed faculty housing and school building) was decided on in 2001 and construction started later that year. The school officially opened on September 17, 2003.

== Admissions ==
The school has an admissions policy that is unusual for private schools in New York City in that incoming children are not screened for ability. Each incoming kindergarten class is made up of two groups of children, one group is drawn from the children of Columbia University faculty and staff, while the second group is drawn from the community of New York City School Districts 3 and 5. Children of Columbia, faculty and staff are chosen through a mix of retention requirements, cross-department representation and a lottery. Children from the community are selected through a random lottery with no screening and every incoming community child is eligible for financial aid on a needs basis. After winning the lottery, parents can schedule a tour the school and children are invited for a 2-hour visit where they spend time in a kindergarten classroom with other applicants However, the application process includes "...an assessment by The School to confirm it can serve the child.", which even for children who "win the lottery" or are otherwise guaranteed a slot through their department, can result in denial of admission for reasons relating to learning needs the School purports it cannot serve.

== Transportation ==
The train serves the school at the Cathedral Parkway-110th Street station. The M4 and M104 buses also serve the school. The M60 SBS and M116 buses stop at 106th Street, and the M11 stops at Amsterdam Avenue. There is one M4 run that is timed to arrive at the school at exactly the time of dismissal.
