= Szentbalázs =

- Village
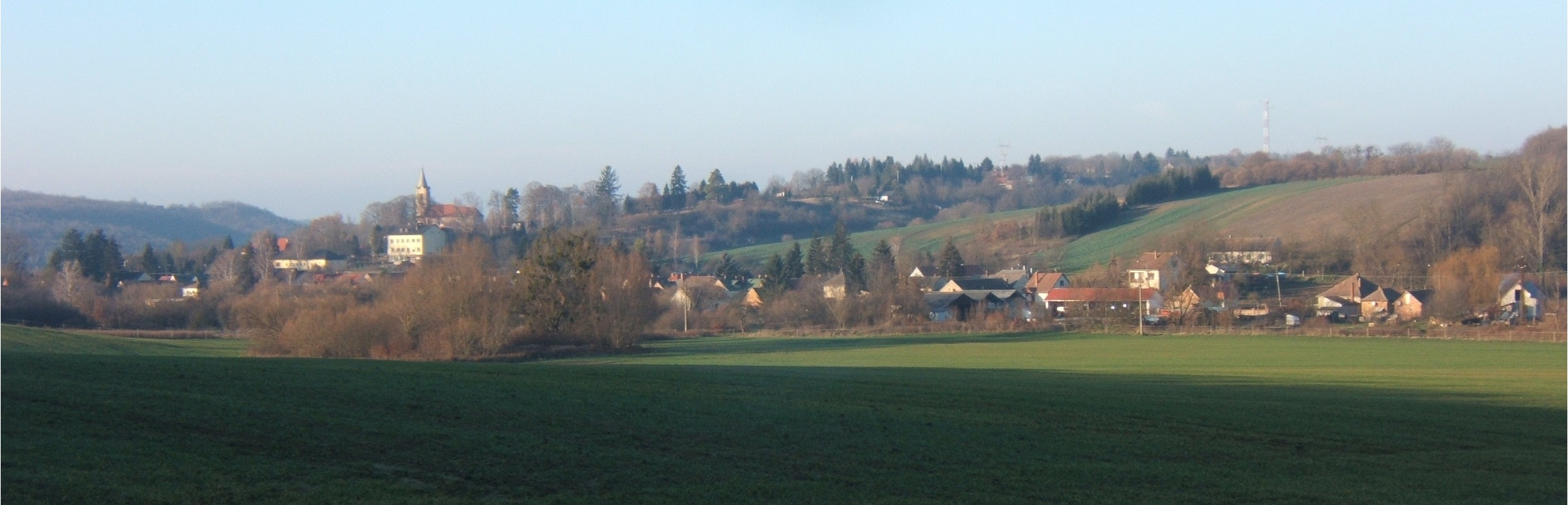
- View of Szentbalázs

- Coat of arms

- Location of Somogy county in Hungary

- Location of Szentbalázs
- Coordinates: 46.32105°N 17.89682°E
- Country: Hungary
- Region: Southern Transdanubia
- County: Somogy
- District: Kaposvár
- RC Diocese: Kaposvár

Area
  - Total: 12.14 km^{2} (4.69 sq mi)

Population (2017)
  - Total: 294
  - Density: 24.2/km^{2} (62.7/sq mi)
- Demonym(s): balázsi, szentbalázsi
- Time zone: UTC+1 (CET)
  - Summer (DST): UTC+2 (CEST)
- Postal code: 7472
- Area code: (+36) 82
- Patron Saint: Saint Blaise
- NUTS 3 code: HU232
- MP: Attila Gelencsér (Fidesz)
- Website: Szentbalázs Online

Szentbalázs is a village in Somogy county, Hungary.

== History ==
According to László Szita the settlement was completely Hungarian in the 18th century.

== Twin city ==
- Zalaszentbalázs
