= Zalaszentbalázs =

Coordinates: 46°35′N 16°55′E

- Village
- Interactive map of Zalaszentbalázs
- Country: Hungary
- Region: Western Transdanubia
- County: Zala County
- Time zone: UTC+1 (CET)
  - Summer (DST): UTC+2 (CEST)

Zalaszentbalázs is a village in Zala County, Hungary.

== Twin city ==
- Szentbalázs
