= Péter Balázs (disambiguation) =

Péter Balázs (born 1941) is a Hungarian politician.

Péter Balázs may also refer to:

- Péter Balázs (canoeist) (born 1982), Hungarian canoeist
- Peter Balazs (mathematician) (born 1970), Austrian mathematician
