= Balazs Szabo =

Hungarian-born artist and author

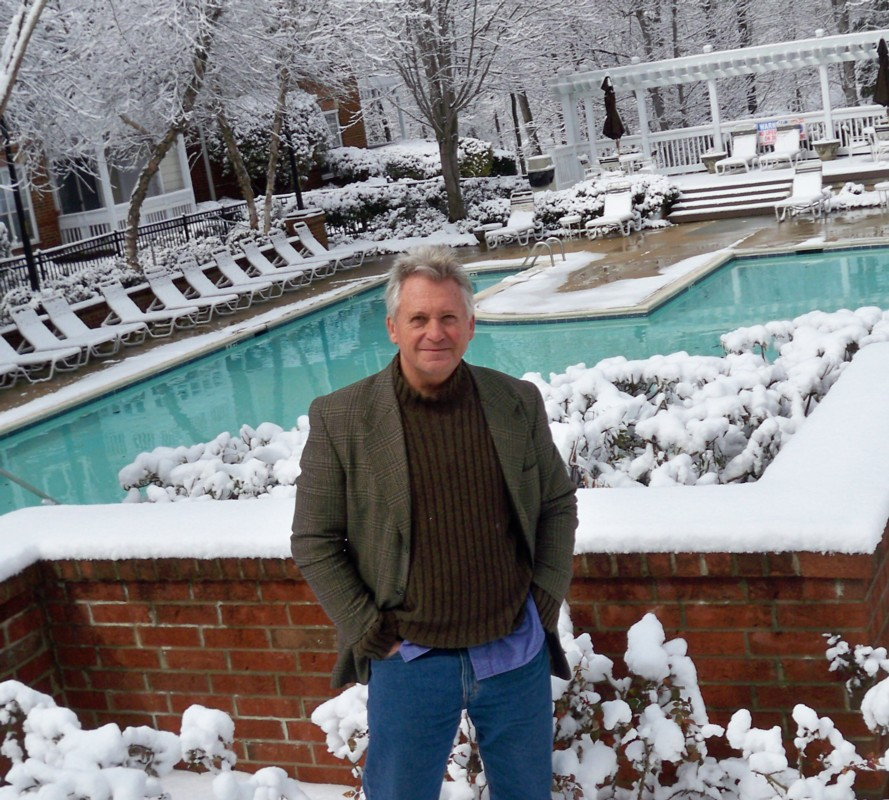

Balazs Szabo (1943–2022) was a Hungarian-born artist and author who lived in the United States from 1956 onward. He was best known as a fine artist influenced by the Viennese "fantastic realists" style. He derived his artistic inspiration from Hieronymus Bosch, Salvador Dalí, Max Ernst, Arik Brauer, and Ernst Fuchs among others. His portraits, large murals and surrealist works can be found in private and corporate collections in Hong Kong, Japan, Australia, Europe and the United States. Balazs Szabo's selected works are in the museums of Hawaii, New Jersey and North Carolina.

Szabo's first published art book, The Eye of the Muse (1985), won the 1987 USA Print Design Excellence Award, having been selected out of 40,000 contestants. His autobiography, Knock in the Night, was published by Refugee Press (2006) and was translated into Hungarian from the original English in 2008.

== Biography ==
Balazs Szabo was the younger of Sandor Szabo's two sons. Balazs's parents divorced in 1947 and Sandor remarried in 1948 to then renowned Hungarian film star Barczy Kato. Sandor Szabo was an acclaimed Hungarian American who received the highest awards an actor can claim in Hungary including the Kossuth Prize. At the age of three Balazs was sent to live with his maternal grandparents, Paula and Eugene at Lake Balaton, while his older brother, Barna, lived with his father in Budapest. Educated and cultured, his maternal grandparents taught him literature, music and art in the small space they shared as a family in a villa which had belonged to them prior to the Communist confiscations. At age seven Balazs met his father again, and a few years later was taken back to Budapest to live with his birth mother. Balazs ran away after experiencing abuse at home from his mother, and testified in court where he appeared by himself. The Court ruled to that Balazs must live with his father, brother and stepmother, Barczy Kato in Budapest.

In 1956 after the defeat of the Hungarian Revolution by the Soviets, his family was placed under house arrest. Balazs escaped, with the rest of his family following ten hours later. They all crossed the Austro-Hungarian border at different points, all uncertain of each other's fate. After a few weeks, Balazs was reunited with his brother, father and stepmother at the Eisenstadt refugee camp outside of Vienna, Austria. Because of his father's stature in Hungary, the family was granted special status with immediate asylum in the United States. After surviving a bumpy emergency crash landing at Ireland's Shannon Airport, the family finally landed as temporary residents of Camp Kilmer, New Jersey as Elis Island was long boarded up.

Balazs's father was soon awarded honorary citizenship in Rhode Island. Upon receiving a Rockefeller scholarship to learn English he moved his family to New York City where he after a year learned English to enjoy a prolific Off and "On Broadway" appearances as well as film and TV career. During his twenty-year stay in the USA he also played at the Lincoln Center in NYC for three years. He was also contracted at the Guthrie Theater of Minneapolis and the Music Center in Hollywood LA. Balazs and his brother attended boarding schools with the financial and loving help of Robert P. and Ann Scott Morningstar of NYC. Sandor arranged for Pal Fried, a famous Hungarian painter and former student of Renoir in Paris to provide privately tutelage for Balazs. At nineteen, he continued to study art in Vienna Austria at the Vienna Fine Arts Academy and later at the Angevandte School of Applied Arts financed by his summer jobs in Sweden. He returned to the United States in 1966 before graduation as he did not believe in exhibiting his diploma on gallery walls, rather his paintings.

Balazs had his first big break with a one-man show in Chicago at the reputable Distelheim Gallery followed by a commission to paint the portrait of Ray Kroc, McDonald's founder, at the age of twenty-three. Relocating to Hollywood, Calif. following his father in 1967, he became art director at Liberty Records, which was later acquired by United Artist Records. From 1967 to 1971 Szabo lived in L.A. He had a successful one man exhibition on ABC TV . Following the 1971 San Fernando earthquake, he moved to Hawaii with his wife where he spent the next twenty years. After his divorce he remarried and had two sons Sandor in 1982 and Dominik in 1985.

While in Hawaii, Balazs painted two murals for the Hawaii State Foundation on Culture and the Arts and various corporations, including the AFLA-CIO. He was selected for a solo exhibition in Honolulu's City Hall (the Honolulu Hale) by then Honolulu Mayor Frank Fasi for the nation's Bicentennial in 1976. He exhibited in Chicago, Hawaii, Hong Kong along with Andy Warhol, Raleigh and Hillsborough despite his independence from galleries. His well known eight murals of Detroit are still there in Michigan, He has exhibited also in New Jersey at American Hungarian foundation, a museum and at the Hartford the Capital of Connecticut. In 1985 Szabo released his first art book with a 3D relief cover, titled "Eye of Muse," a 40-year retrospective collection containing 106 pages in color plates. In 1987 it won the U.S. Print Design Excellence Award out of 40,000 contestant. In late 2009, Szabo published the sequel, "Eye of the Muse II."

== Knock in the Night ==
In 2006, on the 50th anniversary of the Hungarian revolution, Szabo published Knock in the Night, a memoir based on his experiences under Soviet Communist occupation prior to and up to his solo escape after the defeat of the revolution in 1956. In this conflict the Hungarian freedom fighters suffered 50,000 dead or wounded by the Soviets. The book gives an account of growing up under Communist rule. It was enthusiastically endorsed by Mr. Lee Iacocca, former CEO of Chrysler. In 2013 Refugee Press became Knock in the Night's new publisher.

== Later life ==
Balazs lived the remainder of his life in Hillsborough, North Carolina, outside of Chapel Hill, NC, where he raised funds for The Balazs Artist Discovery Museum NC. org, also be located in Hillsborough. This museum launched careers of undiscovered North Carolinian artists, providing inspiration for a book by Balazs, "Rich Artist Poor Artist." The 3,500 sq ft. temporary eco-friendly art museum in its current seed location, will include a gallery, library, art studio.

Balazs Szabo died on January 5, 2022.
