= Balázs Trencsényi =

Hungarian historian

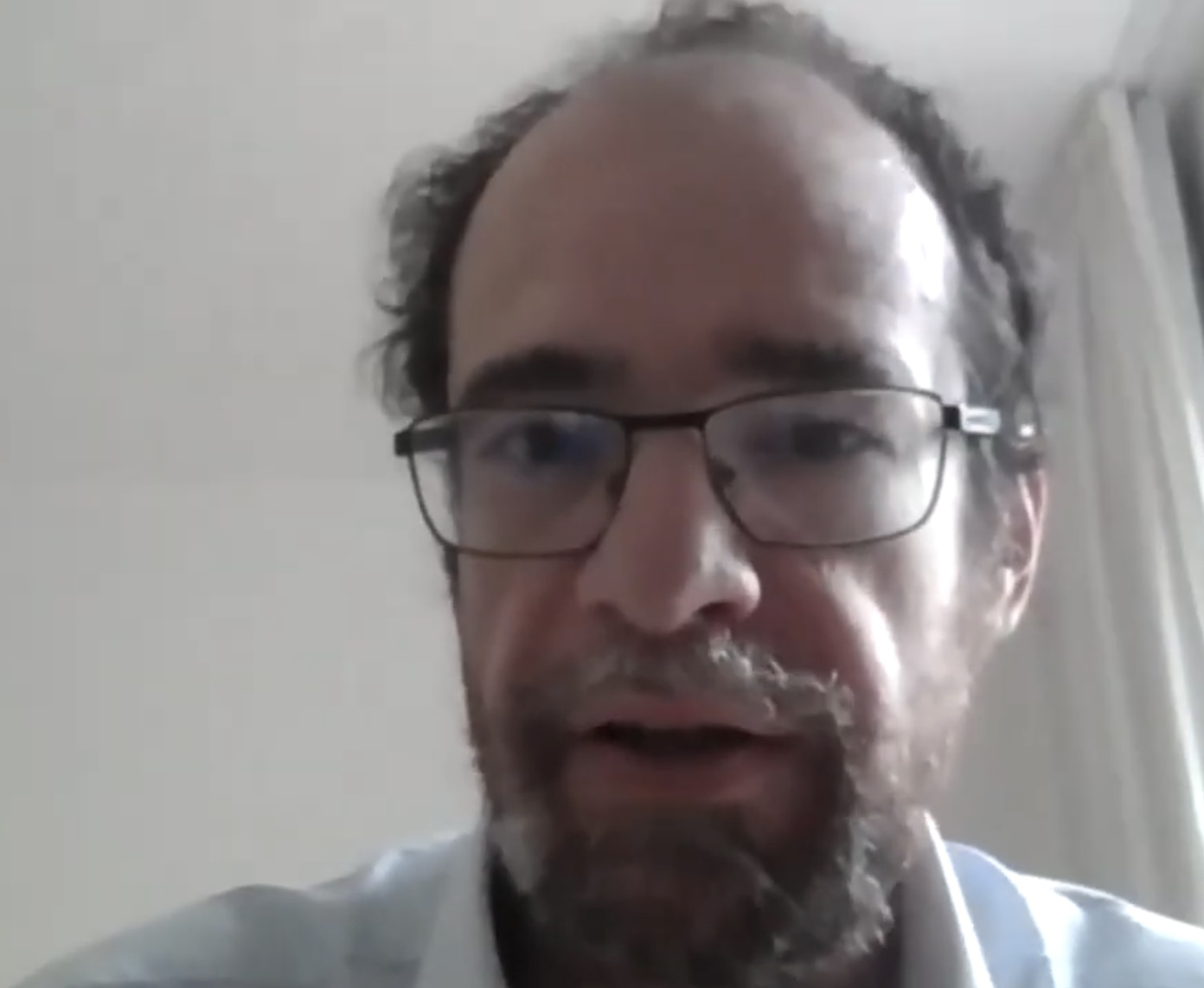
- Born: 1973 (age 52–53); Budapest, Hungary
- Title: Professor

Academic background
- Education: Ph.D.
- Alma mater: Eötvös Loránd University; Central European University
- Thesis: Discourses of Nationhood in Early Modern Europe (2004)
- Doctoral advisor: László Kontler
- Other advisors: Mária Ludassy, György Bence, Ferenc Huoranszki, László Bertalan, Hans Blom, Jonathan Scott

Academic work
- Discipline: Historian
- Sub-discipline: Intellectual history
- Institutions: Central European University

Balázs Trencsényi (born 1973) is a Hungarian historian of East Central European political and cultural thought. He is currently a Professor at the Department of History, Central European University as well as the Co-Director of Pasts, Inc. Center for Historical Studies.

== Life ==
Balázs Trencsényi was born in Budapest. He graduated from Lycée Ferenc Toldy in 1991. He studied history and philosophy at Eötvös Loránd University and graduated with a MA in 1997. In 2004, he graduated from the Central European University with a PhD in history. His doctoral dissertation compared the Hungarian and British discourses of nationhood in the early-modern period.

Since then, he has worked as assistant professor, associate professor, professor, and departmental head at the Department of History, Central European University. He was the director of the History in the Public Sphere Erasmus Mundus MA Program at CEU until 2023. Since then, he has been the director of CEU Institute for Advanced Study.

He has been a visiting fellow and/or member at Institut für die Wissenschaften vom Menschen, Berlin Institute for Advanced Study, International Research School in Conceptual History and Political Thought, University of Jena, Centre Marc Bloch at Humboldt University of Berlin, Institute for Advanced Study in Berlin, Center for Advanced Study Sofia, among other academic institutions.

== Public engagement ==
Balázs Trencsényi has been interviewed by numerous Hungarian-language, German-language, Czech-language, Ukrainian-language, and English-language outlets. Trencsényi views the Orban regime as similar to Horthy system and the Kádár system in that it also managed to win over a "silent majority". Orban's "attack on CEU weaves together a complex web of antiliberal and neo-authoritarian political forces and ideological streams." He is also critical of the technocratic considerations in the European project, which made "people feel overconfident, and neglect their duties, which are actually transnational duties."

He is a co-organizer of the Invisible University for Ukraine.

== Selected works ==
=== In English ===
- The Politics of "National Character": A Study in Interwar East European Thought (Routledge, 2012).
- History of Modern Political Thought in East Central Europe. Volume I: Negotiating Modernity in the "Long Nineteenth Century" by Balázs Trencsényi, Maciej Janowski, Mónika Baár, Maria Falina, and Michal Kopeček (Oxford UP, 2016).
- History of Modern Political Thought in East Central Europe. Volume II/1: Negotiating Modernity in the "Short Twentieth Century and Beyond" (1918-1968) by Balázs Trencsényi, Maciej Janowski, Mónika Baár, Maria Falina, Luka Lisjak-Gabrijelcic, and Michal Kopeček (Oxford UP, 2018) and II/2: Negotiating Modernity in the "Short Twentieth Century and Beyond" (1968-2018) (Oxford UP, 2018).
- Intellectuals and the Crisis of Politics in the Interwar Period and Beyond. A Transnational History (Oxford: Oxford UP, 2025).

=== In Hungarian ===
- A politika nyelvei. Eszmetörténeti tanulmányok (The languages of politics. Studies in intellectual history) (Budapest: Argumentum, 2007).
- A nép lelke. Nemzetkarakterológiai viták Kelet-Európában (The spirit of the people. Debates on national characterology in Eastern Europe) (Budapest: Argumentum, 2011).

== Honours and awards ==
Balázs Trencsényi has been elected as a member of Academia Europaea since 2011. In 2023, he has been awarded Community Service Excellence Award at CEU.
