= Balázs Lengyel =

Balázs Lengyel may refer to:

- Balázs Lengyel (critic) (1918–2007), Hungarian writer and literary critic
- Balázs Lengyel (fencer) (born 1980), Hungarian fencer
