= Edmonston House =

Historic house in New York, United States

- U.S. National Register of Historic Places
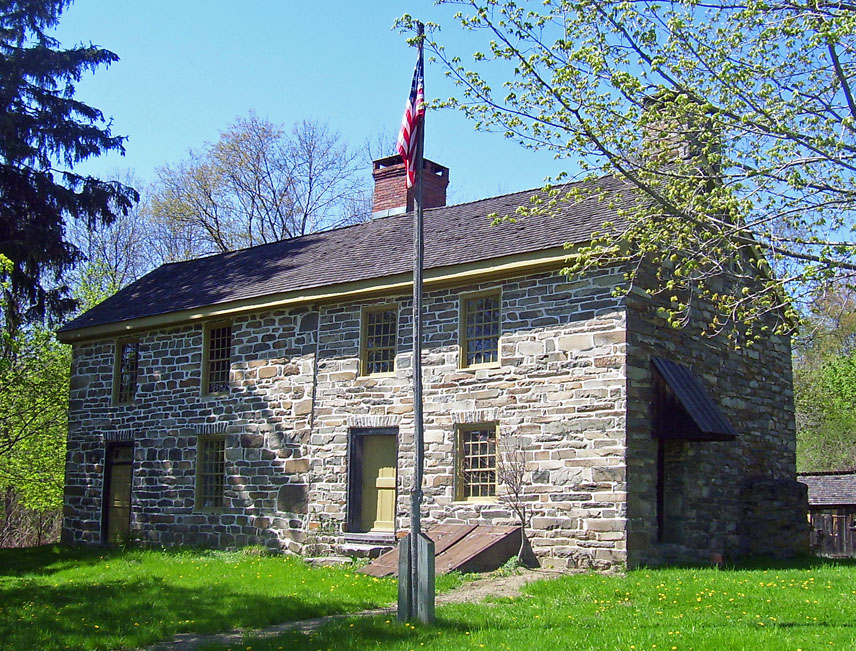
- In 2007
- Location: Vails Gate, NY
- Nearest city: Newburgh
- Coordinates: 41°27′10″N 74°03′51″W
- Built: 1755
- NRHP reference No.: 79001616
- Added to NRHP: 1979

The Edmonston House is a historic stone home located on NY 94 in the Vails Gate section of the Town of New Windsor in Orange County, New York.

== History ==
James and Margaret Smith Edmonston came from County Tipperary, Ireland in 1720. After staying seven years in Plymouth, Massachusetts they moved to New Windsor and purchased 200 acres just west of Vail's Gate from the widow Ingoldsby. The Ingoldsby land was part of the early patent held by Capt. John Evans. For a time Edmonston's log cabin was the only house between New Windsor and what would later become Washingtonville.

The family lived in the log cabin until 1755 when the first 2-story stone house was built, followed soon after with a 2-story stone addition. Built in 1755 by Edmonston, it is said that the house was used as a headquarters during the last years of the Revolutionary War by generals Horatio Gates and Arthur St. Clair and also served as the medical staff headquarters for the nearby encampment of the Continental Army. However historian Edward Manning Ruttenbur asserts that the medical staff was headquartered at the James Clinton house in New Windsor village, while the officers were billeted in a building across the road from the Edmonston house.

In the 1940s the house suffered a serious fire in the east wing.

Today, the house is managed by the National Temple Hill Association, along with the nearby Last Encampment, a town-owned portion of the Cantonment. It is open as a museum from 2-5 p.m. Sundays July through September.

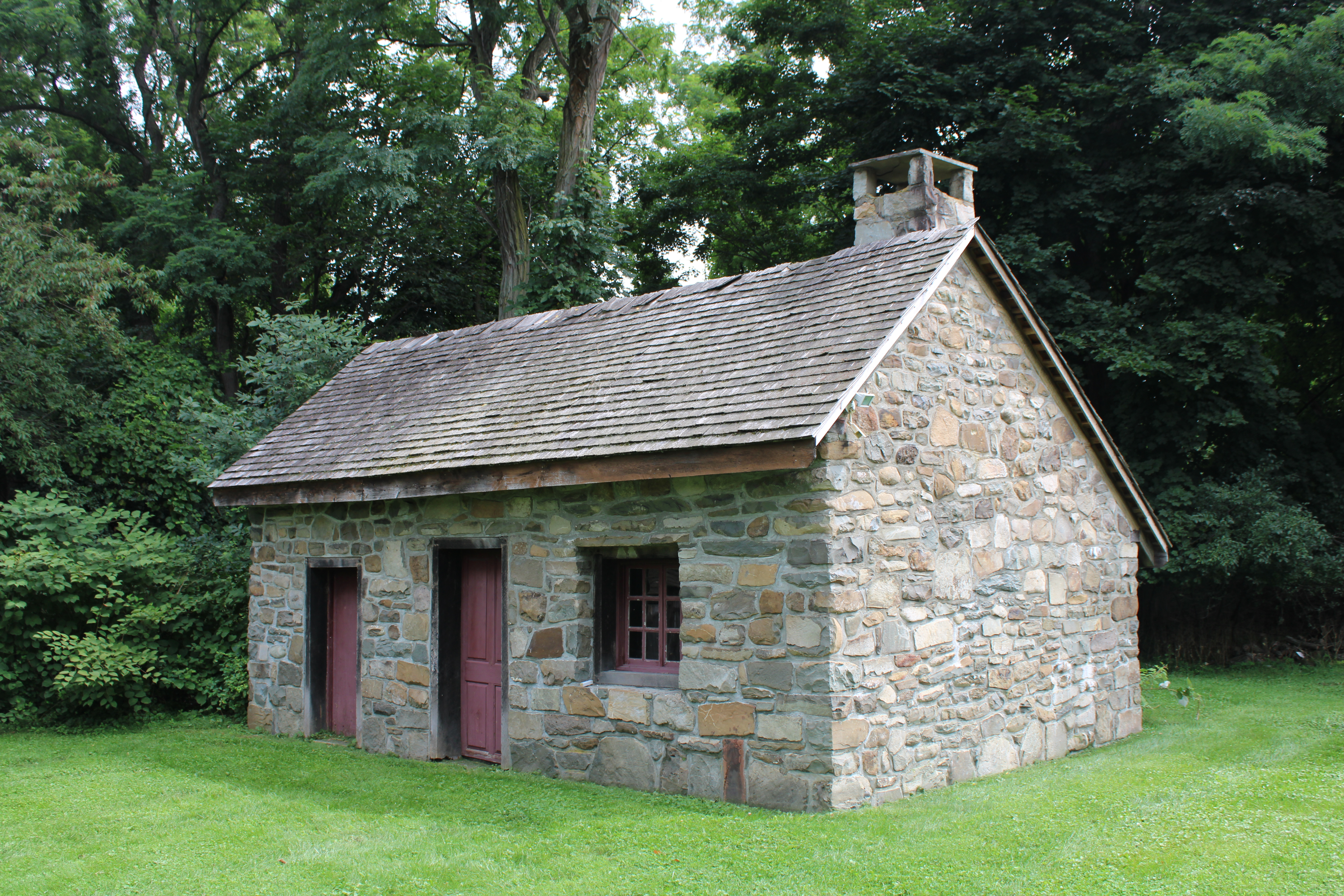
The reconstructed stone outbuilding of freed slave Caesar Mitchell stands behind the house
