= Haskell House (New Windsor, New York) =

Historic house in New York, United States

- U.S. National Register of Historic Places
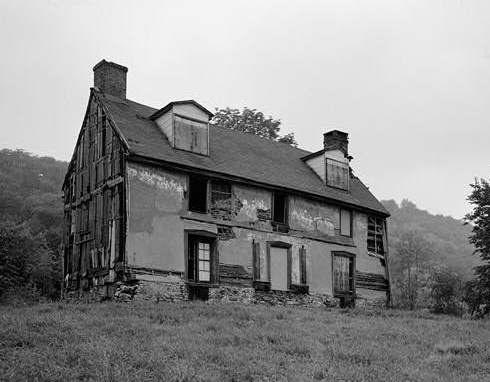
- John Haskell House, 1973

- Location within New York Location within the United States
- Location: W of New Windsor off NY 32, near New Windsor, New York
- Coordinates: 41°28′50″N 74°2′33″W
- Area: 5 acres (2.0 ha)
- Built: c. 1726
- NRHP reference No.: 73001244
- Added to NRHP: June 4, 1973

The John Haskell House, also known as the Hermitage, was a historic home located in New Windsor, Orange County, New York. It was built about 1726, and was a 2 1/2-story log dwelling with a rear ell. It had a gabled roof and large interior chimney at each end. Due to its construction, the Haskell House was considered one of the largest intact log mansions in the Thirteen Colonies.

== History ==
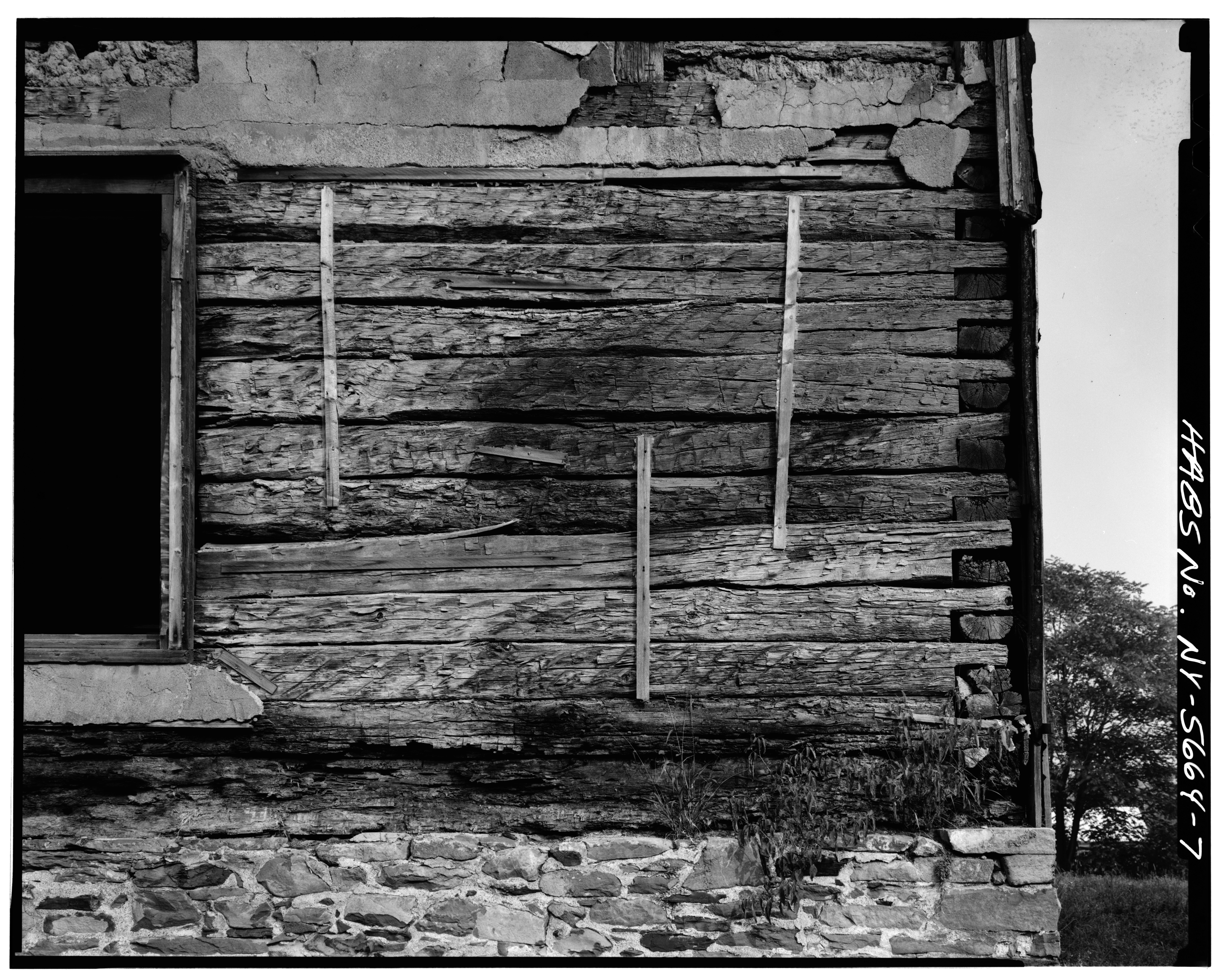
Exposed log details, possibly constructed from Haskell's knowledge of military fortifications

=== Colonel John Haskell ===
The builder of the house, Colonel John Haskell, served as a steward for Brigadier Robert Hunter, colonial governor of New York and New Jersey from 1710 — 1720. After Hunter's appointment, Haskell continued in service to William Burnet. In 1719, he was awarded a tract of nearly 2,000 acres in New Windsor. Showing his appreciation, he contributed to the building of a fort and trading post in Oswego. Burnet paid Haskell five pounds for once again fulfilling his duties.

In 1721, Colonel John Haskell obtained a grant of an additional 2,000 acres backing the lands of William Chambers, who acquired it a decade prior. The grant, which included lands east of Snake Hill, or Muchattoes Hill, became several farms, divided by stone walls. Some remnants of these walls exist through the hill today, though many may be of later construction. According to tradition, Haskell visited England, returning with a variety of seeds and cattle for his new farm. Haskell himself maintained a central plot near the base of the hill, where he constructed a large log manor house after settling the grant. The date of erection for Haskell's house, which he called the "Hermitage," is contested, but likely 1726 or later. Evan Jones, a surgeon, occupied the third lot of the grant with his family.

=== Division of Land ===
Alexander and Cornelius Wood received a lot of 429 acres, including the house, on May 19, 1761, following the death of Haskell and Jones. The executors of Jones' will also sold a larger lot to the forger Samuel Brewster on December 27, 1763. In the roughly eight-year period after the Wood's transfer, Moses Fowler owned a 229-acre portion of it, in turn selling it to Sylvannus Dusenbury on September 19, 1769. The Dusenbury family held the property for several generations.

During the Revolutionary War, Dr. John Jones, son of Evan Jones, assisted in the organization of the Continental Army's Medical Department. 7,000 troops camped on the original Haskell grant.

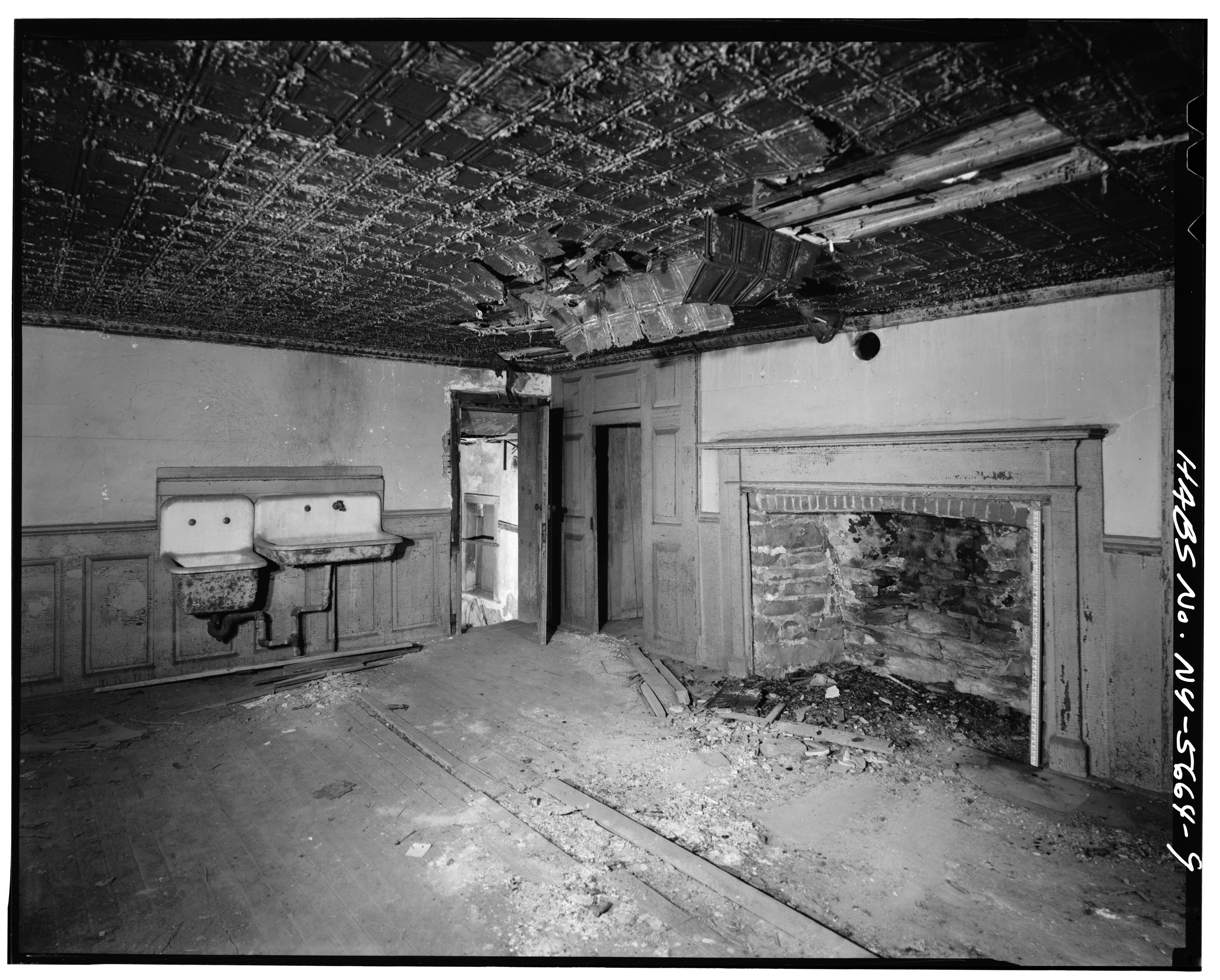
Front parlor with modern fixtures

Ownership of the property fell to several New Windsor families, most renowned being the Vails. Acreage reductions became common over the years, and when a corporation was sold the land in 1970, it had been reduced to 13.5 acres. Calvet Rental Inc. took ownership of the property and house in 1973. The house was also listed on the National Register of Historic Places this year.

=== Interest ===
Curiosity in the Hermitage peaked during this time, as workers for the Historic American Buildings Survey viewed it by commission. Many of New Windsor's 18th century houses had succumbed to demolition in the 20th century. The Orange County Citizens Foundation mobilized to conduct research on the house, with plans to restore and open it as a museum. During this time, Calvet Rental Inc. was using the house for storage, and required ongoing negotiation from the foundation regarding their plans.

On the evening of April 12, 1984, a fire began at the house, spreading quickly throughout. The New Windsor Fire Department called for backup from the City of Newburgh Fire Department, who refused to participate given that they were limited on engines. The ruins of the house were cleared.
