= Robert C. Baker =

American food scientist (1921–2006)

- Born: Robert Carl Baker; December 29, 1921; Newark, New York, U.S.
- Died: March 13, 2006 (aged 84); Lansing, New York, U.S.
- Education: Cornell University; Pennsylvania State University; Purdue University
- Occupations: Food scientist; professor; inventor
- Known for: Inventor of the chicken nugget
- Spouse: Jacoba Munson (m. 1944)
- Children: 7

Robert Carl Baker (December 29, 1921 – March 13, 2006) was an American food scientist, professor, and inventor. He invented the chicken nugget and was responsible for many other poultry-related inventions. For his contributions to poultry sciences, he was inducted into the American Poultry Hall of Fame.

== Early life and education ==
Robert Carl Baker was born on December 29, 1921, in Newark, New York. He earned a bachelor's degree from Cornell University in 1943 studying pomology at the university's College of Agriculture. For his graduate work, Baker took his master's degree in marketing at Pennsylvania State University in 1949 and his doctorate at Purdue University in 1956. Baker was a member of the Alpha Zeta fraternity.

== Career ==
Baker traveled the world innovating how people eat and view chicken. He spent his entire academic life at Cornell University (1957–1989) and published some 290 research papers. In 1970, he founded the university's Institute of Food Science and Marketing. Baker was elected a fellow of the Institute of Food Technologists in 1997.

Baker is notable in the cuisine of Upstate New York for developing "Cornell chicken," a regionally popular recipe for grilled chicken, particularly small whole birds, with an apple cider vinegar–based marinade. Baker had in fact developed this recipe while working at Penn State in 1950, but it never gained appreciation until he joined the faculty at Cornell.

McDonald's is often falsely credited with the invention of the chicken nugget. In fact, Baker published his chicken nugget recipe in the Cornell publication Agricultural Economics Research in April 1963, while McDonald's patented its recipe for Chicken McNuggets in 1979 and started selling the product in 1980.

Baker is also the creator of Eggbert, a talking animatronic egg that originally answers questions about egg production, and later became a Christmas season fixture at Devitt's Nursery in New Windsor, New York. Baker created Eggbert in 1953.

== Personal life and death ==
Baker married his wife, Jacoba Munson, in 1944, and together they raised three sons, Myron, Dale, and Kermit, and four daughters, Regina, Reenie, Johanna, and Karen. He died on March 13, 2006, at his home in Lansing, New York, of a heart attack.

== In popular culture ==
Comedic singers Paul Sabourin and Greg "Storm" DiConstanzo, better known as Paul and Storm, wrote a song dedicated to Baker titled "Nugget Man," which featured in their 2007 album Gumbo Pants. The song pays tribute to the late professor and his most popular invention, the chicken nugget. It humorously explores Baker's career, lists a few of his other inventions, details the formula for chicken nuggets, and describes the impact of his invention. Sabourin and DiConstanzo said they were inspired to write the song in 2006 when they read an obituary for Baker; the duo had never heard of Baker prior, but upon reading the obituary and learning of his invention, they were inspired to write a song in his honor.

In the television series The Wire, three of the street drug dealer characters discuss who may have invented the chicken nugget and what fortune it may have brought him, with D'Angelo Barksdale, the Crew Chief, pointing out that any such person would have been unlikely to have received any great reward and that the heads of McDonald's were instead more likely to have been the main beneficiaries.

In the Netflix series Bill Nye Saves the World, Baker is portrayed by actor Michael Ian Black in the angry scientist section of season 3 episode 4.
