= Eggbert =

Eggbert may refer to:

- Eggbert (1994 video game), a game for the MSX 2, and inspiration of the game Toki Tori
- Speedy Eggbert, a 1998 PC game developed by EPSITEC
- Eggbert (New York), two talking animatronic eggs, one located at Devitt's Nursey & Supply in New Windsor, New York during Christmas and the other located at the New York State Fair in Syracuse, New York.
