= Eggbert (New York) =

Talking animatronic egg

Eggbert refers to two talking animatronic eggs, both located in New York State. Of the two existing Eggberts, one is located at Devitt's Nursey & Supply on Route 32 in New Windsor, New York during Christmas season from Black Friday until Christmas Eve and the other is located at the New York State Fair in Syracuse, New York.

== Eggbert at the New York State Fair ==
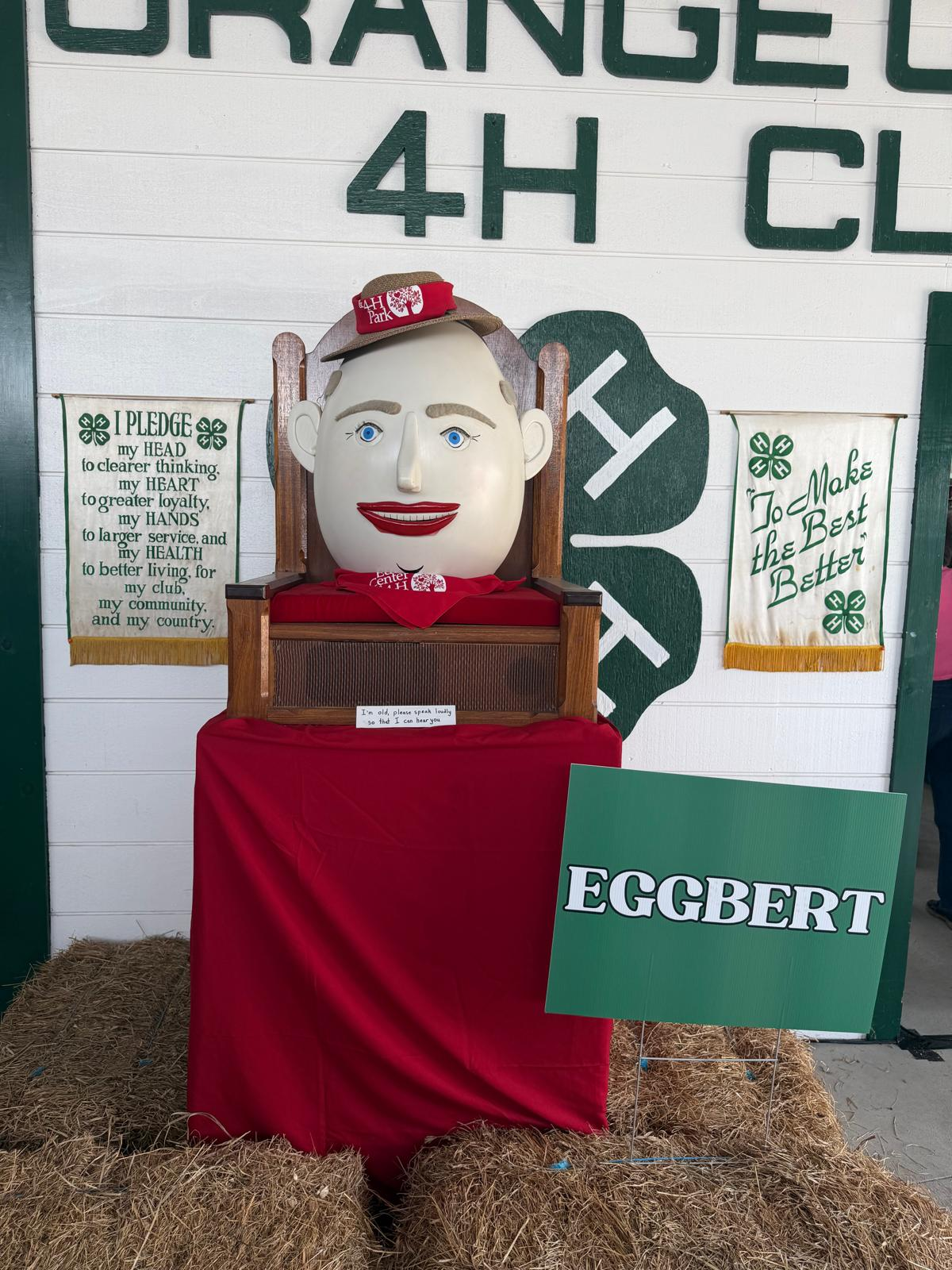
Eggbert at the Orange County 4-H Fair in Otisville, NY in 2026.

Eggbert was created by Cornell University Professor Robert C. Baker, who also created the chicken nugget, to promote the poultry and egg industry in New York. Eggbert has appeared since 1953 at the New York State Fair, where he was first given his crown by Governor Thomas Dewey. At the fair, he answers questions about egg production.

This Eggbert has also appeared at other fairs, including Cornell Cooperative Extension's Orange County 4-H Farm and Family Fair.

== Eggbert at Devitt's Nursey and Supply ==
Devitt's Nursey was founded by Clem Devitt in 1951. Their annual Christmas displays began "because they had a greenhouse they couldn't afford to heat, so they borrowed some animals from some farmer customers to provide heat." The also added some Christmas items including Santa and his elves and a Nativity scene.

In 1971, one of the Eggberts used at the New York State Fair was purchased by Jack Devitt (1943–2010), owner of Devitt's Nursery in New Windsor, New York. By the early 1970s, somewhere between 75,000 and 80,000 people visited the farm each year. During this period, "for decades, many children in this part of the Hudson Valley bypassed Santa's lap, favoring the company of Eggbert the talking egg."

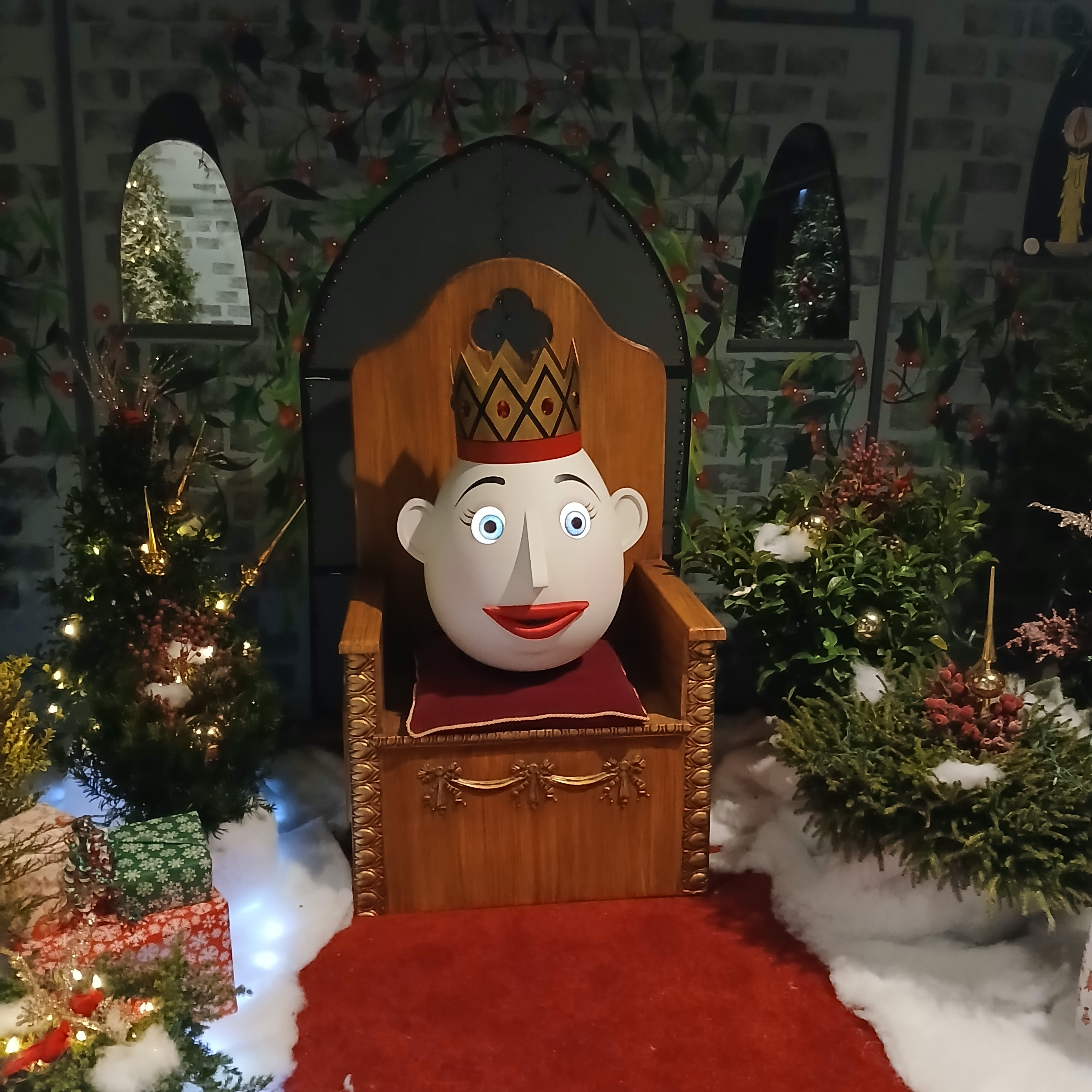
Eggbert at Devitt's in New Windsor in 2025.

Devitt sold his nursery to Agway in 1996 and the location closed in 2000. Eggbert last appeared for Christmas 1999 and then put in storage. During this period there were rumors that Eggbert had been destroyed in a fire.

Eggbert returned in 2011, when new owners purchased the nursery. Eggbert was refurbished in 2012. In 2015, approximately 10,000 visitors came to see Eggbert that year.

Eggbert did not appear at the nursery in 2020 or 2021 due to the COVID-19 pandemic.

In 2017, Newburgh Brewing Company created "Angry Eggbert IPA." In 2019 and 2022, Eggbert made appearances at Newburgh Brewing Company.

=== Description ===
Eggbert is made of plexiglass. He weighs 42 pounds, is 2.5 feet tall and 3 feet wide.

An employee of the farm operates Eggbert's eyes and mouth and is able to speak to visitors through a remote system. He tells jokes and egg-themed puns.
