= Knox's Headquarters State Historic Site =

- Knox Headquarters
- U.S. National Register of Historic Places
- U.S. National Historic Landmark
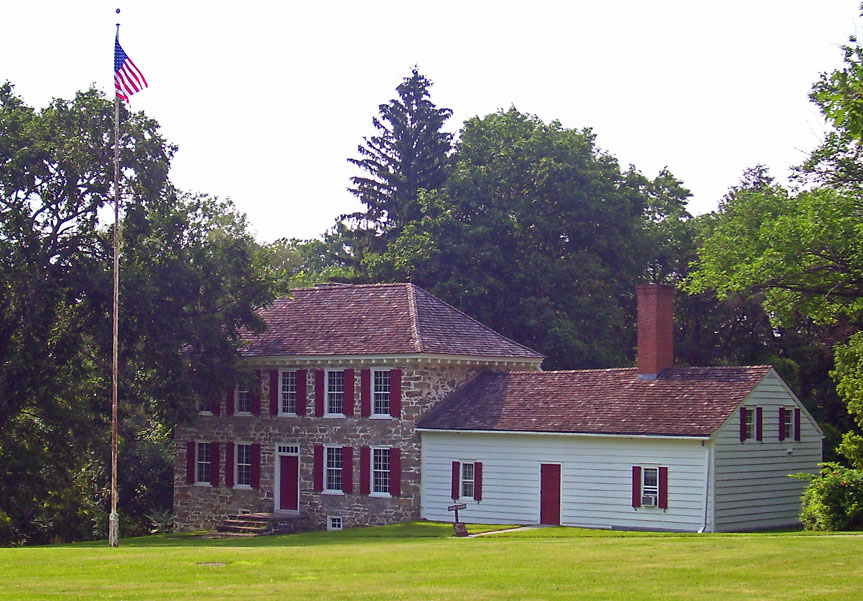
- The Ellison House at Knox's Headquarter's State Historic Site in New Windsor, New York
- Location: Vails Gate, New York
- Nearest city: Newburgh
- Coordinates: 41°27′18″N 74°03′00″W
- Built: 1755
- Architect: William Bull
- Architectural style: Georgian
- NRHP reference No.: 72000901

Significant dates
- Added to NRHP: November 9, 1972
- Designated NHL: November 28, 1972

Knox's Headquarters State Historic Site, in the town of New Windsor, New York, consists of the Georgian house of the Ellison family, built in 1754 by immigrant William Bull of Hamptonburgh, New York, and the grounds around it. The site is located on Old Forge Hill Road, just south of Route 94 east of Vails Gate.

Although most closely associated with Founding Father Henry Knox, who used it as his headquarters as the Revolutionary War drew to a close in the early 1780s, it was used as a general's headquarters throughout most of the war, by Nathanael Greene and Horatio Gates.

The site was declared a National Historic Landmark in 1972. While owned by the New York State Office of Parks, Recreation and Historic Preservation the Ellison House is administered and operated by the Palisades Interstate Park Commission, like many other state parks and historic sites in the mid and lower Hudson region.

Today, the house can be toured when the site is open. It is used to educate visitors about how 18th-century families such as the Ellisons actually lived. On holidays and special occasions staff dress in reproduction period clothing and give special events. Staff dressed as the 2nd Continental Artillery frequently demonstrate cannon use on the grounds during special events, as Knox was best known for his command of Continental artillery.

The house and its grounds were the setting and subject of the children's haunted-house novel Buried Treasure: A Tale of an Old House (1919), by the best-selling children's author Henry Everett McNeil. The book is illustrated with McNeil's own photographs (made circa 1911 or 1912) of the various buildings and bridge at the Knox site.

The Jane Colden Plant Sanctuary along some of the trails in the nearby woods memorializes America's first female botanist, who also resided in the area.

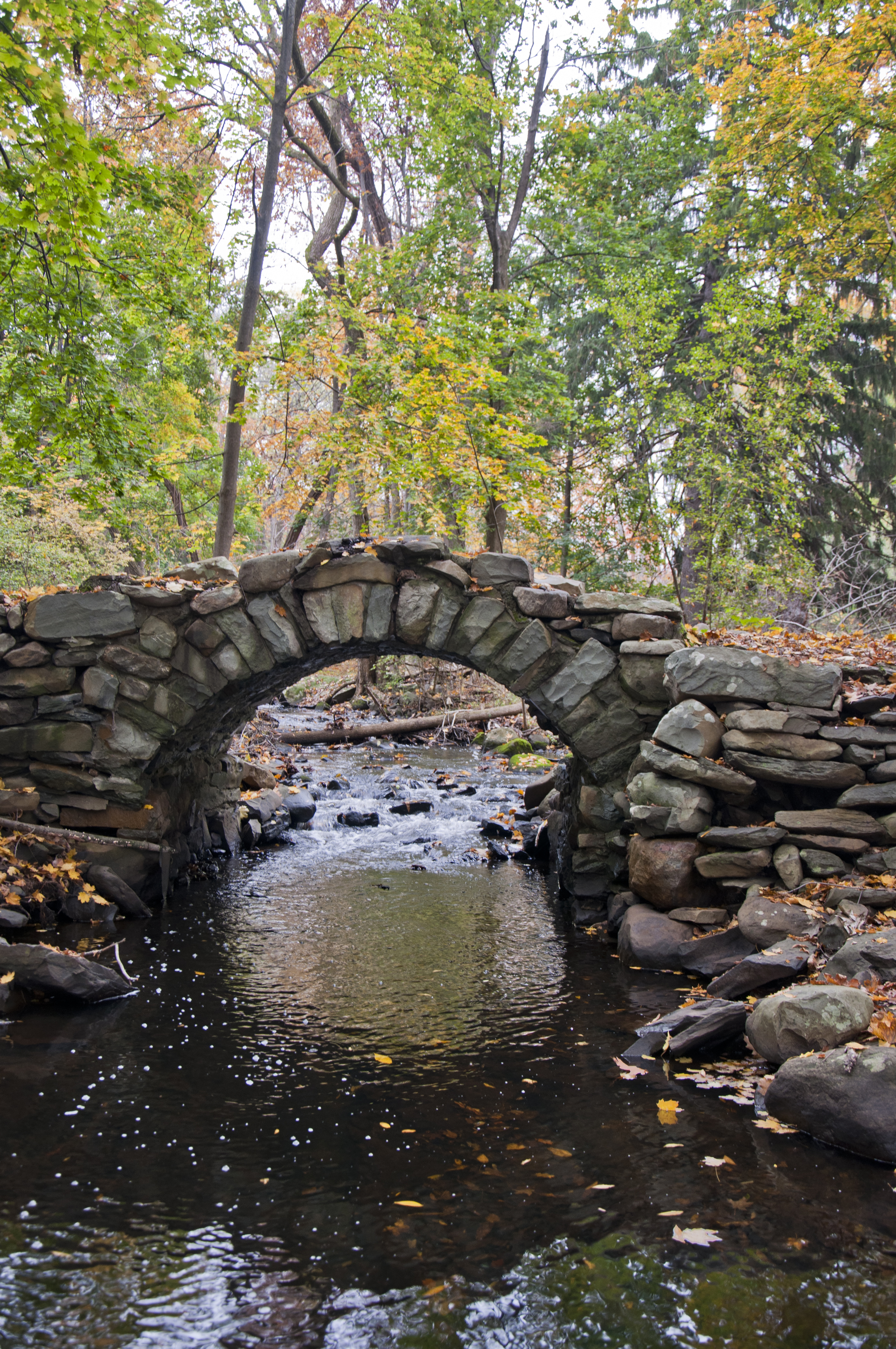
Stone bridge in the woods surrounding Knox's Headquarters.

== See also ==
- New Windsor Cantonment State Historic Site
- Washington's Headquarters State Historic Site
- List of National Historic Landmarks in New York
- List of New York State Historic Sites
