= Thomas McDowell House =

Historic house in New York, United States

- U.S. National Register of Historic Places
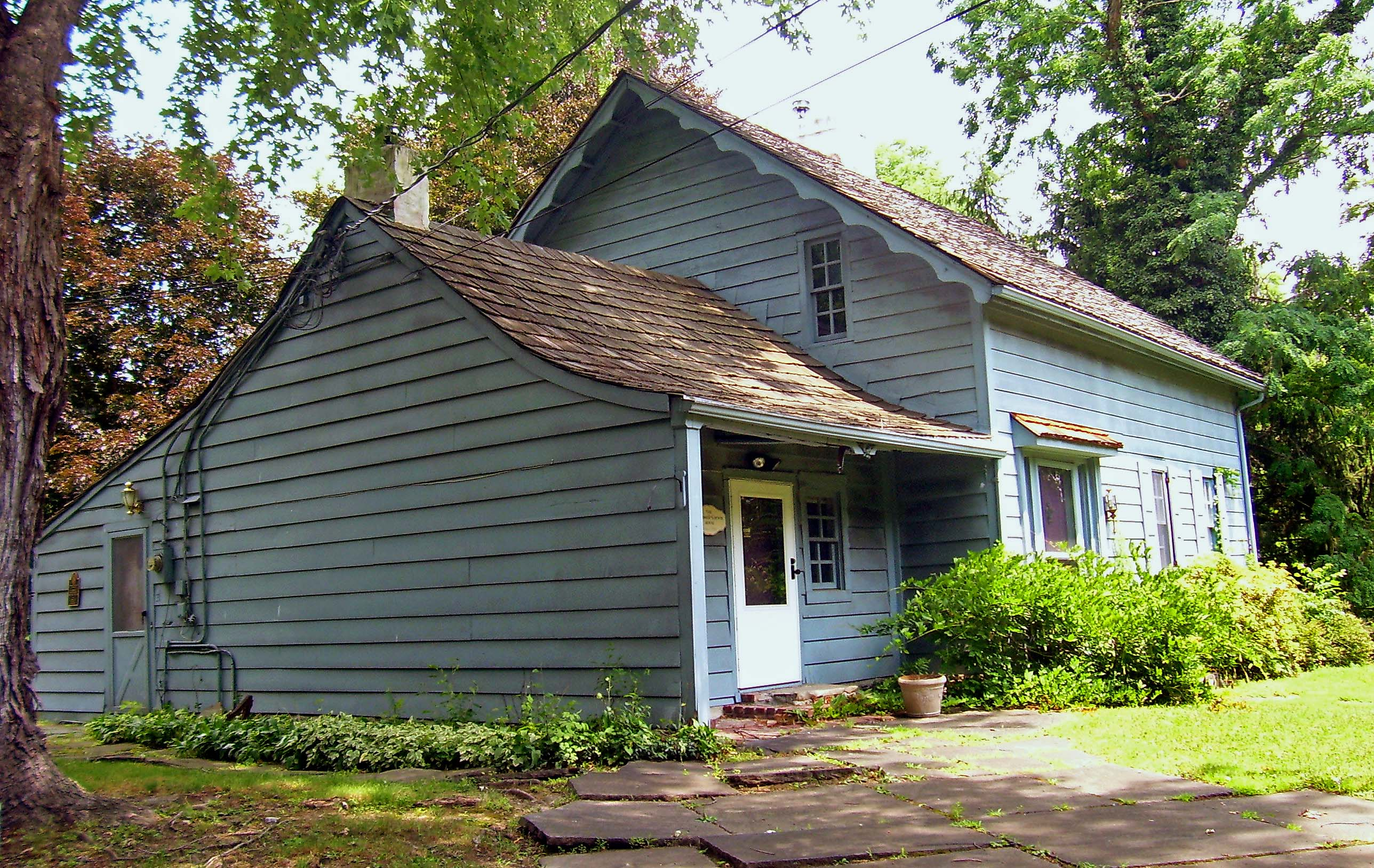
- House in 2007
- Location: Little Britain, NY
- Nearest city: Newburgh
- Coordinates: 41°28′11″N 74°06′39″W
- Built: c. 1770
- NRHP reference No.: 04000753
- Added to NRHP: July 28, 2004

The Thomas McDowell House is located on Lake Road in the Little Britain section of the Town of New Windsor in Orange County, New York, United States. It was built c. 1770 by McDowell, an early settler of the area, and was later rented out by his descendants to prominent local weaver James Alexander. In 2004 it was added to the National Register of Historic Places.

It is one of the last surviving homes built by the original Little Britain settlers, a mostly Irish group that had survived a difficult sea voyage to the New World, and the only one that remains mostly in its original form. Some later residents left behind reminders of the tastes of later eras.

== Property ==
The main house is a 1 1/2-story three-bay main block with a one-story, three-bay kitchen wing on the west and a smaller, newer bedroom wing to the north. Both are built of heavy-hewn post and beam framing and sided in clapboard with a fieldstone foundation. Both the main block and the kitchen wing have medium-pitched gabled roofs, with the latter's flaring out to the rear, producing a saltbox effect. Cedar shakes cover both roofs.

The south-facing front facades of both blocks feature windows and an entrance in the westernmost bay. The main block's door is a board-and-batten piece that retains its original ironwork. There is a single window on the west elevation; on the east is a three-sided projecting bay window added later on. A brick chimney comes up from the roof at the west.

Inside, the original side-hall floor plan is intact. Besides the board-and-batten doors, however, many of the finishings and decoration are of later vintage, possibly the early 19th century.

Three other contributing resource are located on the property. Two are buildings, an 1870 carriage barn and a smaller shed known as the "garden studio". Both are wood. The last is a structure, the section of the original stone wall around the south and west sides of the property.

== History ==
It is believed that McDowell built the house around 1770; although no records exist to show this, deeds do show that it was that year he acquired 34 acres (14 ha) from James Humphrey. McDowell was the son of James McDowell, a native of County Longford in Ireland who was one of the few survivors of a malnutrition-plagued Atlantic crossing in 1729 funded by Charles Clinton, grandfather of future New York State governor DeWitt. Bound for Pennsylvania, the survivors landed instead in Cape Cod. Two years later, in 1731, they made their way to the Hudson Valley where they were the first settlers in the area they called Little Britain.

Thomas B. McDowell was 44 when he became the first owner of record in 1803. He may have added some of the interior decoration, such as a wooden mantelpiece typical of that era's Federal style homes. Sometime in the 1810s, he rented the house out to James Alexander, another Irish immigrant who was noted in histories of the period for his skill as a weaver. His son Joseph described the parcel as being about 60 acres (24 ha) at that time.

In 1845 Thomas B. McDowell left the house to his son Alexander, who mortgaged it heavily to pay his debts. By this means it eventually became the property of Alfred Denniston, who probably added the east side's bay window. He sold it to Agnes Corwin in 1871. It remained in her family until the late 20th century.

== Aesthetics ==
The McDowell house is a 1 1/2-story "half-house", with minimal fenestration so as to better retain heat in the winter, very typical of English vernacular architecture in the rural Hudson Valley during the colonial period. The minimal detail from the original house shows the influence of the waning Georgian style. The house may also have been influenced by Thomas McDowell's brief sojourn in New England after his arrival in America.

Later styles are evident in some of the alterations. The wooden mantelpiece is a Federal hallmark, probably added during that style's rise in the early 19th century. The projecting bay window on the east is a common Picturesque feature, seen on many Hudson Valley homes built or modified around the middle of that century due to the influence of Newburgh resident Andrew Jackson Downing.

== See also ==
- National Register of Historic Places listings in Orange County, New York
