= Robert O. Binnewies =

American activist

- Born: 1937 (age 88–89)
- Occupation: Conservationist
- Notable work: Palisades, 100,000 Acres in 100 Years

Robert O. Binnewies (born August 18, 1937, Bowling Green, Kentucky) is an American conservationist. Graduate, Colorado State University, 1959, bachelor of science degree, forest recreation. Joined National Park Service, 1961, as a park ranger, Yellowstone National Park, Wyoming. Subsequent NPS assignments included Washington, D.C., 1964–1966, chief ranger, Acadia National Park, Maine, 1967–1971, and superintendent, Yosemite National Park, California, 1979–1986.

While in Maine, Binnewies assisted Mrs. David (Peggy) Rockefeller in establishment of the Maine Coast Heritage Trust, a nonprofit organization that champions the voluntary use of conservation easements to protect privately owned lands. To date, the trust has encouraged protection for more than 125,000 acres (510 km^{2}) of island and coastal habitat in Maine. Binnewies served as executive director of the trust, 1971–1976.

Binnewies served as group vice president, National Audubon Society, 1977–1978, before being selected as Yosemite National Park superintendent in 1979. While at Yosemite, he signed the 1980 General Management Plan that calls for major reductions in commercial, administrative, and transportation activities to better preserve the natural values of Yosemite Valley. He also initiated the Return-of-Light fundraising campaign (now the Yosemite Conservancy) that has generated more than $50 million in charitable financial support for Yosemite. In 1986, Binnewies was abruptly reassigned from Yosemite to the National Park Service Western Regional Office, San Francisco, after confirming that he had legally, but surreptitiously, tape recorded one conversation with a park critic.

In 1988, Binnewies was appointed by Governor Mario Cuomo as assistant commissioner for natural resources, New York Department of Environmental Conservation. In 1990, he was selected as executive director, Palisades Interstate Park Commission, and led the commission's successful decade-long initiative to acquire 17,500-acre (71 km^{2}) Sterling Forest, the largest remaining open space in the New York/New Jersey Metropolitan Region. He also initiated action that led to establishment of the National Purple Heart Hall of Honor at New Windsor, New York.

He is author of Palisades, 100,000 Acres in 100 Years, Fordham University Press, 2000, an account of the commission's century-long conservation activities. He is author of Your Yosemite, A Threatened Public Treasure, White Cloud Press, 2015, an account of Yosemite's history and management challenges. Since his retirement, Binnewies has served as chairman of the board of the Santa Lucia Conservancy, California, and the Los Luceros Foundation, New Mexico.
