= Vails Gate, New York =

- CDP
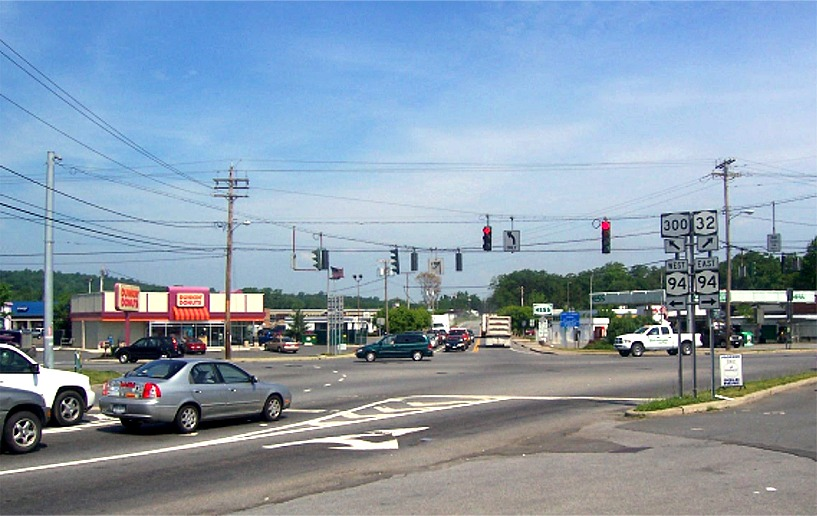
- Five-way intersection of Routes 32, 94 and 300 in Vails Gate. Referred to as "Five Corners"

- Location in Orange County and the state of New York.

- Location within the state of New York
- Coordinates: 41°27′15.6″N 74°3′26.6″W
- Country: United States
- State: New York
- County: Orange

Area
  - Total: 1.03 sq mi (2.67 km^{2})
  - Land: 1.03 sq mi (2.67 km^{2})
  - Water: 0 sq mi (0.00 km^{2})
- Elevation: 282 ft (86 m)

Population (2020)
  - Total: 3,368
  - Density: 3,266.0/sq mi (1,261.02/km^{2})
- Time zone: UTC-5 (Eastern (EST))
  - Summer (DST): UTC-4 (EDT)
- ZIP code: 12584
- Area code: 845
- FIPS code: 36-76584
- GNIS feature ID: 0968340

Vails Gate is a hamlet (and census-designated place) in Orange County, New York, United States. The population was 3,368 at the 2020 census. It is part of the Kiryas Joel–Poughkeepsie–Newburgh, NY Metropolitan Statistical Area as well as the larger New York–Newark–Bridgeport, NY-NJ-CT-New York metropolitan area.

Vails Gate is in the southern part of the Town of New Windsor, located on Route 32. It is defined largely by the junction of that highway with Routes 94 and 300, a busy commercial center which has the ZIP code 12584. Part of that also spills into adjacent regions of the Town of Cornwall to the south.

== History ==
The locale has always been referred to as a neighborhood of New Windsor. In the 19th century, it became known as Vail's Gate, after John D. Vail, a former postmaster and keeper of the Blooming Grove Turnpike tollgate. For the same reason, it was also earlier called Tooker's Gate.

Vail served as the first postmaster of the New Windsor post office, established on April 10, 1850, being named the Mortonville Post Office. The name was finally changed to Vails Gate Post Office, which led to the apostrophe permanently dropping from the name. Efforts to change the name of the hamlet to Mortonville, after the Morton family, residents of the Ellison House, never occurred.

=== Historic sites ===
- Knox's Headquarters
- New Windsor Cantonment
- Edmonston House
- Vails Gate Methodist Church and Cemetery
- Brewster's Forge Memorial

== Geography ==
Vails Gate is located at 41°27′29″N 74°3′13″W (41.457943, -74.053484).

According to the United States Census Bureau, the CDP has a total area of 1.0 square mile (2.6 km^{2}), all land.

== Demographics ==
Historical population
Census	Pop.	Note	%±
2000	3,319		—
2010	3,369		1.5%
2020	3,368		0.0%
U.S. Decennial Census

=== 2020 census ===
As of the 2020 census, Vails Gate had a population of 3,368. The median age was 40.8 years. 19.7% of residents were under the age of 18 and 19.4% of residents were 65 years of age or older. For every 100 females there were 91.3 males, and for every 100 females age 18 and over there were 87.0 males age 18 and over.

100.0% of residents lived in urban areas, while 0.0% lived in rural areas.

There were 1,462 households in Vails Gate, of which 26.7% had children under the age of 18 living in them. Of all households, 33.1% were married-couple households, 21.8% were households with a male householder and no spouse or partner present, and 37.1% were households with a female householder and no spouse or partner present. About 36.1% of all households were made up of individuals and 18.2% had someone living alone who was 65 years of age or older.

There were 1,579 housing units, of which 7.4% were vacant. The homeowner vacancy rate was 2.9% and the rental vacancy rate was 6.2%.

Racial composition as of the 2020 census
Race	Number	Percent
White	1,480	43.9%
Black or African American	763	22.7%
American Indian and Alaska Native	45	1.3%
Asian	158	4.7%
Native Hawaiian and Other Pacific Islander	0	0.0%
Some other race	507	15.1%
Two or more races	415	12.3%
Hispanic or Latino (of any race)	1,139	33.8%

=== 2000 census ===
As of the 2000 census, there were 3,319 people residing in the CDP. The population density was 3,330.5 inhabitants per square mile (1,285.9/km^{2}). There were 1,459 housing units at an average density of 1,464.1 per square mile (565.3/km^{2}). The racial makeup of the CDP was 72.34% White, 11.87% African American, 0.39% Native American, 4.19% Asian, 7.17% from other races, and 4.04% from two or more races. Hispanic or Latino of any race were 19.31% of the population.

There were 1,421 households, out of which 28.2% had children under the age of 18 living with them, 43.4% were married couples living together, 11.7% had a female householder with no husband present, and 39.4% were non-families. 32.4% of all households were made up of individuals, and 12.5% had someone living alone who was 65 years of age or older. The average household size was 2.34 and the average family size was 2.98.

In the CDP, the population was spread out, with 23.0% under the age of 18, 6.9% from 18 to 24, 31.2% from 25 to 44, 22.7% from 45 to 64, and 16.2% who were 65 years of age or older. The median age was 38 years. For every 100 females, there were 91.6 males. For every 100 females age 18 and over, there were 88.6 males.

The median income for a household in the CDP was $39,851, and the median income for a family was $44,485. Males had a median income of $38,636 versus $31,019 for females. The per capita income for the CDP was $22,967. About 7.8% of families and 10.4% of the population were below the poverty line, including 12.3% of those under age 18 and 1.9% of those age 65 or over.

== Education ==
The school district is Newburgh City School District.
