= Chicken nugget =

Breaded deboned chicken meat pieces

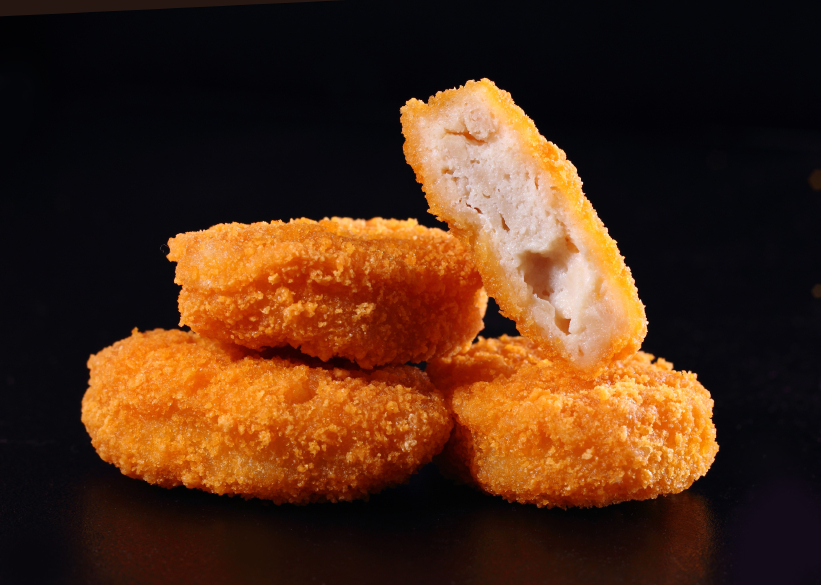
- Place of origin: United States
- Created by: Robert C. Baker
- Invented: 1950s
- Serving temperature: Hot
- Main ingredients: Chicken meat or plant-based ingredients
- Ingredients generally used: Breadcrumbs or batter
- Similar dishes: Fried chicken; Chicken fingers

A chicken nugget is a food product consisting of a small piece of deboned chicken meat that is breaded or battered, then deep-fried or baked. Developed in the 1950s by finding a way to make a coating adhere, chicken nuggets have become a popular fast food restaurant item, and are widely sold frozen for home use. There are also vegetarian "chicken" versions made from meat alternatives that are coated in bread as the standard ones are.

== History ==
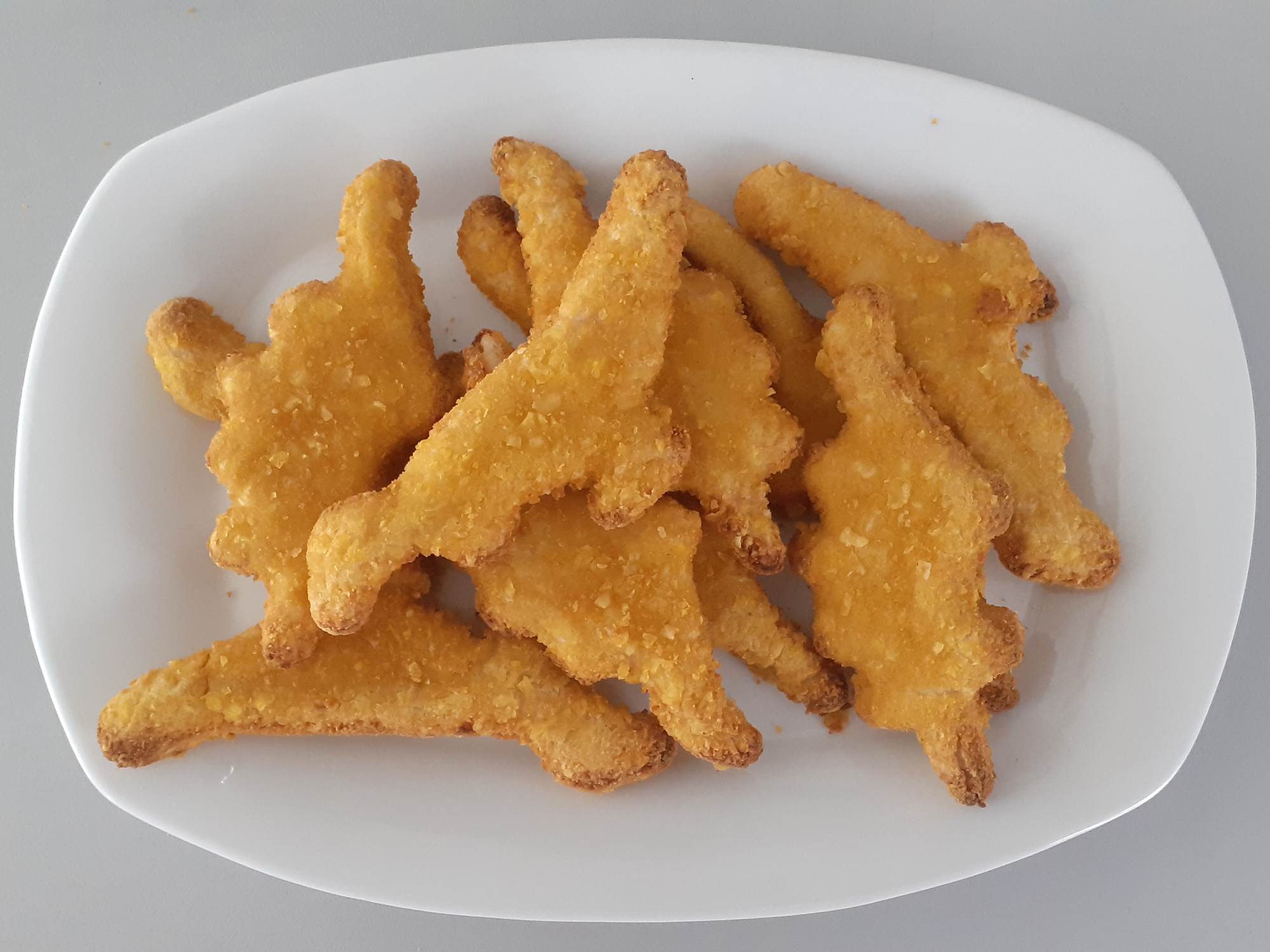
Plate of dinosaur-shaped chicken nuggets

The chicken nugget was developed in the 1950s by Robert C. Baker, a food science professor at Cornell University, and published as unpatented academic work. Bite-sized pieces of chicken, coated in batter and then deep fried, were called "Chicken Crispies" by Baker and his associates. Two problems the meat industry was facing at the time were being able to clump ground meat without a skin and producing a batter coating that could be both deep-fried and frozen without becoming detached. Baker's innovations solved these problems and made it possible to form chicken nuggets in any shape by first coating the meat in vinegar, salt, grains, and milk powder to make it hold together and then using an egg- and grain-based batter that could be fried as well as frozen.

Dinosaur-shaped (or simply dino) chicken nuggets were first trademarked by Perdue Farms in 1991, and its rise in popularity was possibly assisted by the success of the Jurassic Park franchise.

== Nutritional information ==
Chicken nuggets are generally regarded as a fatty, unhealthy food. A study published in the American Journal of Medicine analyzed the composition of chicken nuggets from two American fast food chains. It found that less than half of the material was skeletal muscle, with fat occurring in an equal or greater proportion. Other components included epithelial tissue, bone, nervous tissue and connective tissue.

== Manufacturing ==
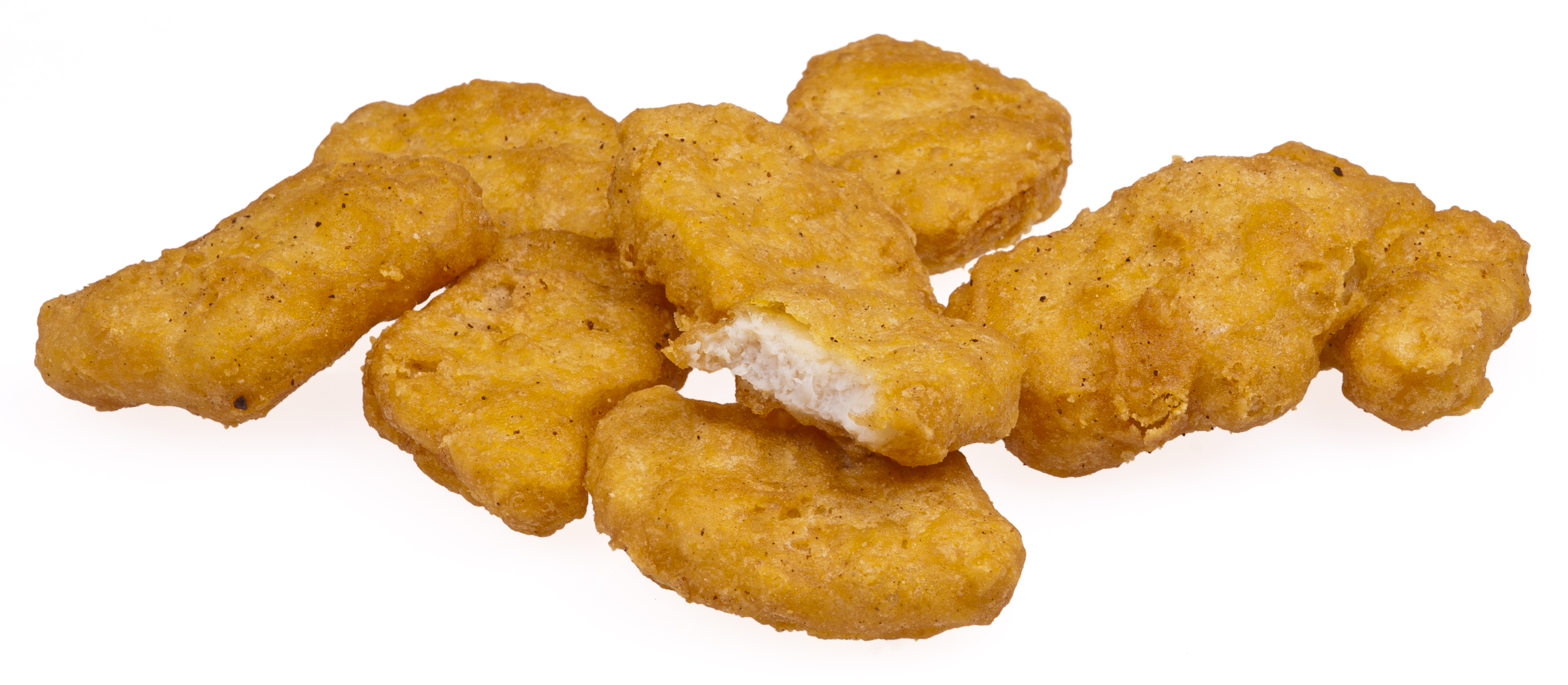
Fast food Chicken McNuggets from McDonald's

The processing required for making chicken nuggets begins with deboning. The chicken is cut and shaped to the correct size. This is done either manually, or by a series of automatic blades, or by a process called grinding (a method of deboning in which the softer parts of the chicken carcass are forced through a mesh, leaving behind the more solid pieces, resulting in a meat paste. If used, this paste is then shaped before battering). The pieces are battered and breaded in a large cylindrical drum that rotates, evenly coating all of the pieces in the desired spices and breading. The pieces are then fried in oil until the batter has set and the outside reaches the desired color. Finally, the nuggets are packaged, frozen and stored for shipping. While specific ingredients and production methods may vary between manufacturers, the above practices hold true for most of the industry.

== In popular culture ==
Chicken nuggets have been the subject of food challenges, social media phenomena, and many more forms of public notoriety. The dish has inspired gourmet restaurants, exercise routines, and even feature-length productions, including Cooties, a movie about a grade school child who eats a chicken nugget infected with a virus that turns prepubescent children into zombies. Thomas Welborn holds the world record for eating the most chicken nuggets in three minutes (746 grams, or approximately 42 chicken nuggets).

On Twitter, the most retweeted tweet of 2017 was made by Carter Wilkerson who asked Wendy's what it would take for them to offer him a year of free nuggets. The tweet generated over 3.5 million retweets.

The largest recorded chicken nugget weighed 51.1 pounds (23.2 kg) and was 3.25 feet (0.99 m) long and 2 feet (0.61 m) wide and was created by Empire Kosher. It was unveiled at Kosherfest in Secaucus, New Jersey on October 29, 2013.

== Vegan nuggets ==
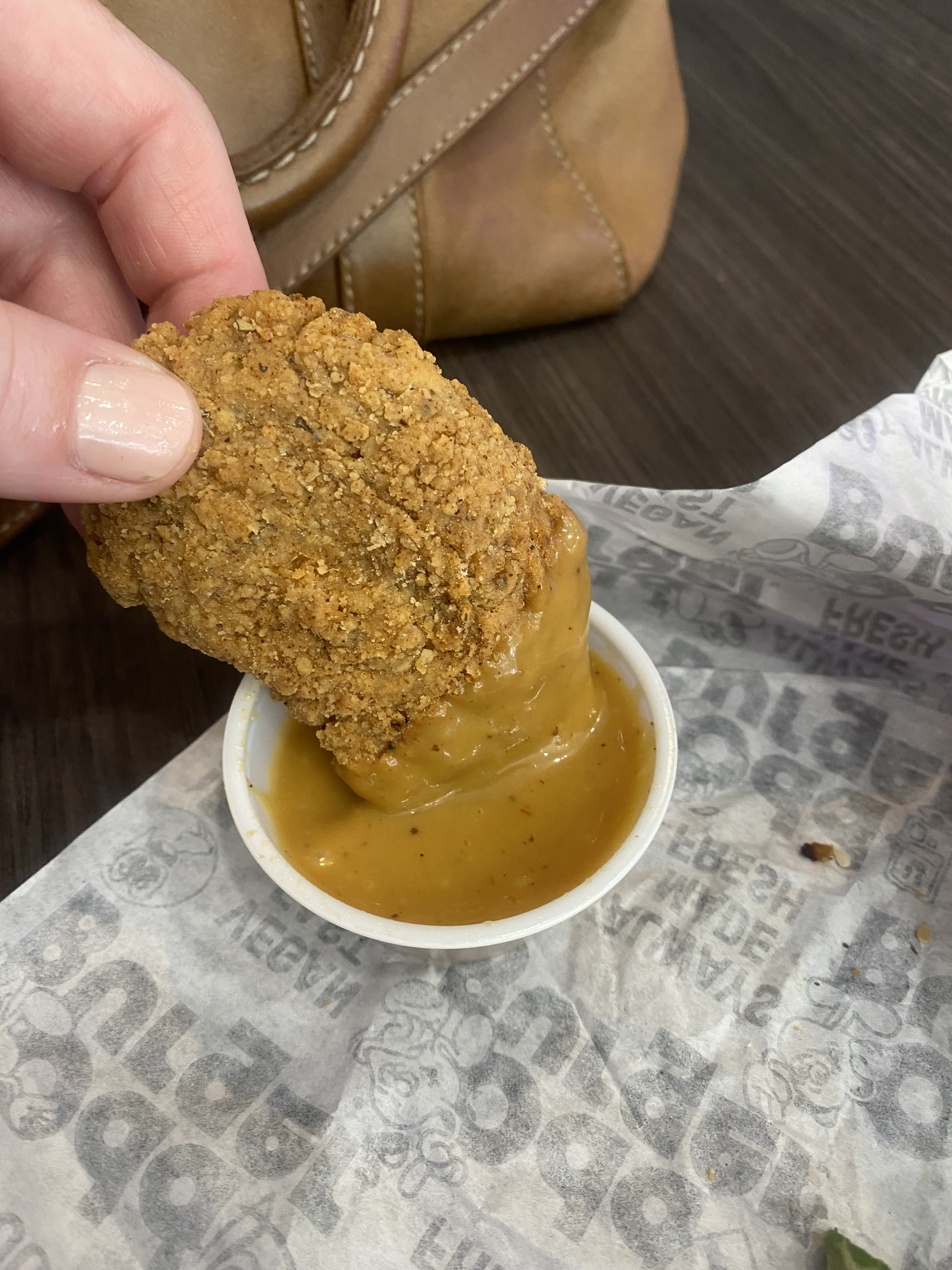
A vegan "ChickUn" nugget from Odd Burger in Ontario, Canada

Vegan "chicken" nuggets, made with plant-based ingredients, have entered the market in recent years. They are sold by major retailers as vegan chicken nuggets and made from ingredients that include pea protein, soy protein, textured vegetable protein, and wheat gluten. Companies such as Beyond Meat, Impossible Foods, Morningstar Farms, and Simulate sell vegan chicken nuggets. In 2019, McDonald's trialed vegan McNuggets made of chickpeas and potatoes in Norway. Swedish fast food restaurant Max Hamburgare offers a dish containing nuggets made of falafel. Quorn also supplies vegetarian chicken-like nuggets derived from fungus. In 2022, KFC began serving vegan chicken nuggets at its 4,000 U.S. locations.

In 2022, Michele Simon wrote in Forbes that there were more than 20 brands selling vegan chicken nuggets. In 2022, Avery Yale Kamila said in the Portland Press Herald that because young people are the most interested in vegan food, it was not surprising that "vegan foods associated with childhood, such as hot dogs and chicken nuggets, would be the first to partner with youth-oriented TV shows and movies." Vegan "chicken" nuggets have been taste-tested, for example in 2021 by Culture Map Dallas and in 2022 by Bon Appétit.

Research suggests plant-based alternatives to chicken nuggets generally have lower environmental impact – including greenhouse gas emissions, land use, and water use – than conventional chicken-based products. Studies also indicate they differ in nutrition, with plant-based alternatives typically containing less saturated fat, and that replacing meat with plant-based alternatives may lower LDL and total cholesterol.

== See also ==
- Chicken McNuggets
- Chicken tenders
- Fried chicken
- Popcorn chicken
