= New Windsor, New York =

- Town
- Town of New Windsor
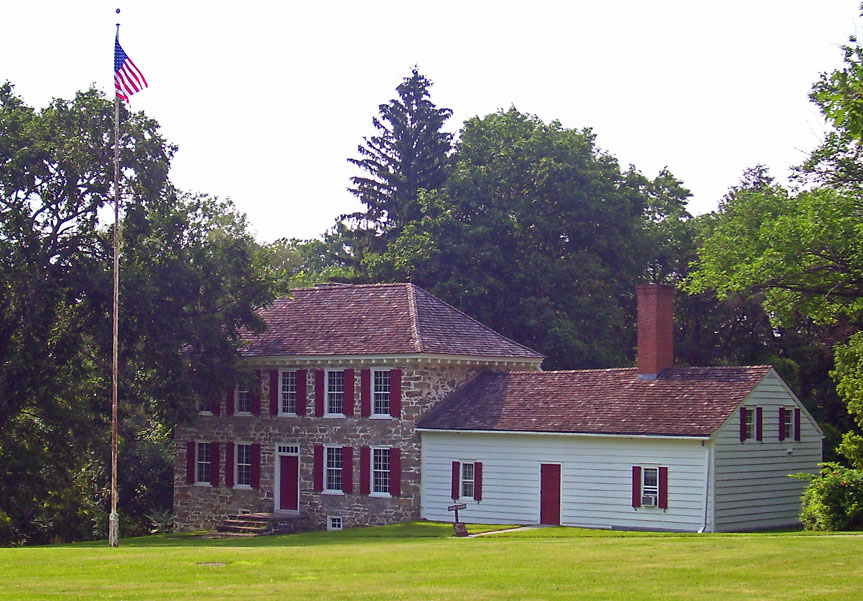
- Knox's Headquarters Historic Site

- Seal

- Location in Orange County and the state of New York.

- Location within the state of New York
- Coordinates: 41°28′36.3″N 74°01′25.5″W
- Country: United States
- State: New York
- County: Orange
- Founded: April 5, 1763 (263 years ago)
- Founder: General Assembly of New York
- Named for: Windsor, England

Area
  - Total: 37.06 sq mi (95.99 km^{2})
  - Land: 34.08 sq mi (88.26 km^{2})
  - Water: 2.98 sq mi (7.73 km^{2})
- Elevation: 512 ft (156 m)

Population (2020)
  - Total: 27,805
  - Density: 815.9/sq mi (315.0/km^{2})
- Time zone: UTC-5 (Eastern (EST))
  - Summer (DST): UTC-4 (EDT)
- ZIP code: 12553
- Area code: 845
- FIPS code: 36-50848
- GNIS feature ID: 0979274
- Major airport: Stewart Airport (SWF)
- Website: newwindsor-ny.gov

New Windsor is a town in Orange County, New York, United States. The population was 27,805 at the 2020 census. It is located on the eastern side of the county and is adjacent to the Hudson River and the City of Newburgh.

== History ==
The region was originally inhabited by the Munsee people, part of the Lenape confederation. The first European settlers were colonists from Scotland who arrived in 1685. New Windsor was founded by the General Assembly of New York on April 5, 1763.

=== European Settlements ===
Settlement rights in the area that now encompasses the town were obtained from the Munsee by Governor Thomas Dongan, who encouraged the settlement of a party of Scottish colonists led by David Toshack, the Laird of Monzievaird, and his brother-in-law Major Patrick McGregorie. They arrived in 1685 and settled in the area overlooking the Hudson River near Moodna Creek. McGregorie is said to have built a cabin north of the creek on Conwanham's Hill at Plum Point, while Toshack set up a trading post south of the creek on Sloop Hill. In June 1685, Governor Dongan appointed McGregorie Muster-Master of Militia for the City and province of New York.

A rival claim was obtained in 1694 by Captain John Evans of HMS Richmond, who was granted powers and privileges as lord of the manor. The next governor, the Earl of Bellomont, decided that this was unfair to the settlers, and had the Evans grant annulled in 1699. An additional patent of 1,000 acres was issued in 1709 to William Chambers and William Southerland. Around 1709, the portion of the town nearest the Hudson River was organized under the Precinct of the Highlands (Ulster County), remaining thus until 1743. In 1762, separate precincts were created for the Town of New Windsor and Newburgh.

The name of the town is from Windsor, England, with the New being prefixed. By whom this was conferred cannot be ascertained, but first appears in 1728 records of the London "Society for the Propagation of the Gospel in Foreign Parts". Among the earliest roads was the King's Highway, later known as "the Goshen Road", which ran north and south. Among the early residents of the town was William Ellison, who, as early as 1732 kept a store and owned sloops that sailed from New Windsor to New York. Captains James and William Jackson also owned their own sloops.

=== American Revolutionary War ===
During much of the Revolutionary War, New Windsor served as the major depot for the Continental Army and Army Medical Dept. The majority of town residents supported the war efforts and its leaders.

In October 1782, the troops began to arrive and set up tents, while they began building their huts. This encampment or cantonment covered 1600 acres (6.5 km^{2}) and quartered 6000–8000 men, women and children from New York, New Jersey, New Hampshire, Massachusetts and Maryland. Here this army built a log city of over 700 huts for the soldiers and many other outbuildings, guardhouses, blacksmith shops, a stable, kitchens, and a hospital. In addition, a long building called the "Temple" was constructed. It was proposed by Rev. Israel Evans, Chaplain to the Army, that a structure be built for religious services. The building also served a general meeting hall. Upon its completion, the officers held a ball.

In order to reward the fidelity and faithfulness of soldiers, Gen. Washington ordered the establishment of an honor, the Badge of Military Merit, to be bestowed on them. Today, this honor is known as the Purple Heart. The National Purple Heart Hall of Honor is located New Windsor.

In an effort to preserve this encampment, the town of New Windsor acquired a 167-acre (0.68 km^{2}) tract consisting of much of the former hut sites. Since 1936, the town of New Windsor and the membership of the National Temple Hill Association have striven to ensure the preservation of this, the final winter encampment.

=== Post-Revolution ===
The Little Britain Presbyterian Church was organized by Irish and Scottish immigrants. The first church building was constructed in 1765 and used by the Continentals as a hospital. This was subsequently destroyed by fire and a new structure was erected in 1807.

In 1814, the town was divided into nine school districts. The first school was a one-room schoolhouse built on Quassaick Avenue in 1841. Epiphany Apostolic College was founded in 1925. The site is now owned by the Newburgh Enlarged City School District.

Circa 1858 to 1859, the Palmer and Longking company operated on the Quassaick Creek the first large scale factory for the manufacture of "bellows-box" daguerreotype cameras. The factory, on the site of Sterrit's former pin factory, had approximately thirty-five employees. The building was later converted to a flour mill and subsequently burned down.

== Historical sites ==
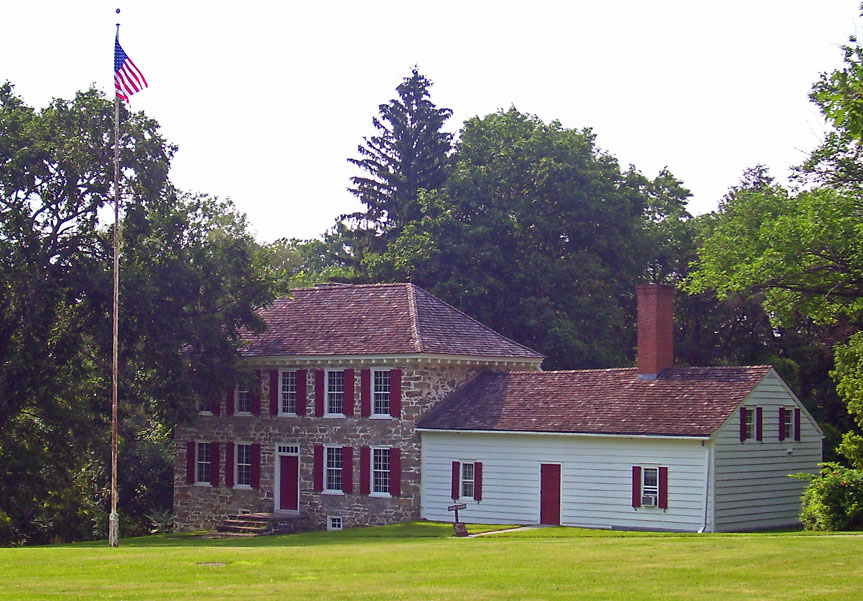
Knox's Headquarters

- Knox's Headquarters: In 1724 Thomas Ellison purchased the Vincent Matthews property at Vails Gate. In 1754 Thomas Ellison Jr. had noted stonemason William Bull of Hamptonburgh build a stone mansion and mill off Forge Hill Road. The property later passed to his son, John Ellison. Grain from as far west as Montgomery was ground and sold at this mill. The house later served during the Revolutionary War as a Continental Army's headquarters for generals Nathanael Greene, Horatio Gates and subsequently by Henry Knox.
- New Windsor Cantonment State Historic Site: A patent was granted to Colonel John Haskell in 1719 of 2,000 acres and another 2,000 acres in 1721 upon which he settled in 1726. He erected a log manor on what was known as the Dusenberry farm, upon which the army erected the Temple when encamped there. In addition to the Last Encampment of the Continental Army hut sites owned by the town of New Windsor, the temple site is operated by the state of New York, known as the New Windsor Cantonment. Located there is the Mountainville Hut, believed to be a survivor from the encampment.

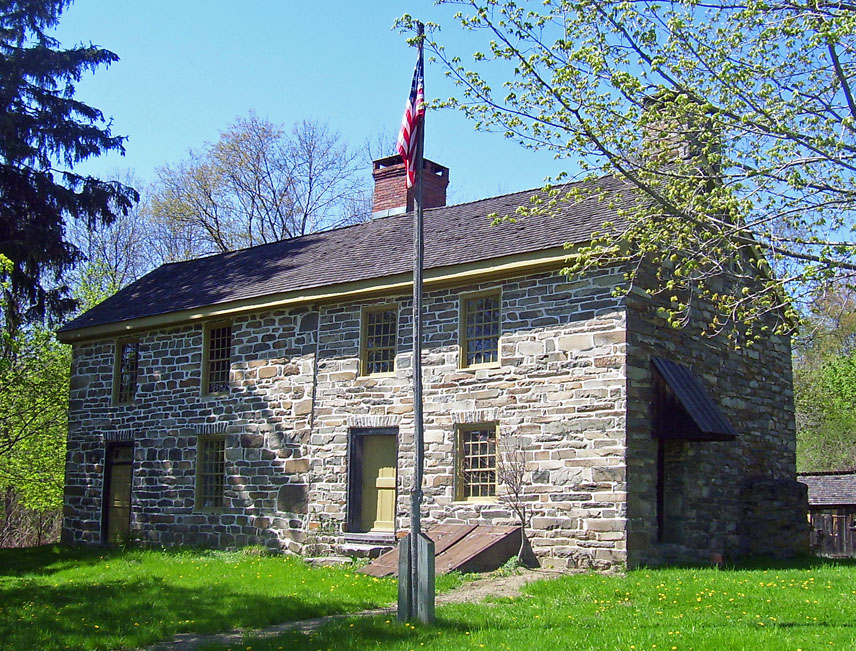
Edmonston House

- Squire Patton House: A farmhouse owned by the Patton family built in the 1790s with subsequent exterior additions and interior embellishments. A synthesis of English and Dutch vernacular styles prevalent among colonial houses in the Hudson Valley.
- Edmonston House: James Edmonston came from County Tipperary, Ireland in 1720. For time his log cabin was the only house between New Windsor and what would become Washingtonville. A stone house located on Route 94 was built by James' son William in 1755 to replace the log cabin.
- The Thomas McDowell House, located on Lake Road in the Little Britain section of the town was built around 1770 by McDowell, an early settler of the area. It was added to the National Register of Historic Places in 2004.
- The Brewster House: Samuel Brewster and his brother Henry came to New Windsor about 1743 and had been among the first proprietors of the township in 1749. The Brewster House was built in 1762 as a simple fieldstone house. Brewster was a member of the Committee of Safety during the American Revolution. He is mainly remembered in local history as the owner of a saw-mill, forge and anchor shop and assisted in forging the chain which was stretched across the Hudson River in the hope of checking the movement of British vessels up that stream. The building now houses Schlesinger's Steak House.

== Churches ==
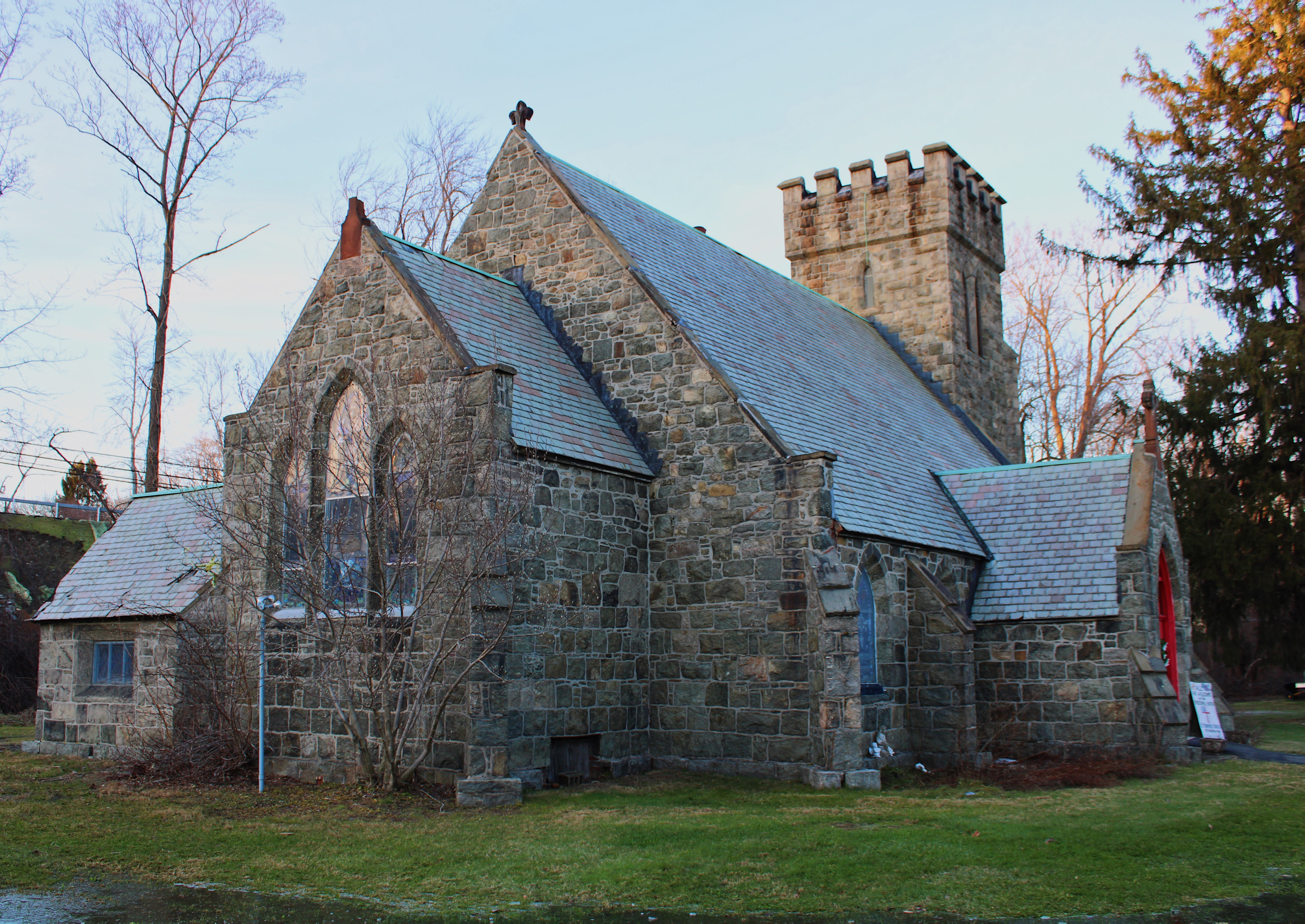
- St. Thomas Episcopal Church
  The Vails Gate United Methodist Church (originally the New Windsor Methodist Church) was founded in 1789. The congregation met in John Ellison's store until 1807 when a church was built on land donated by Ellison. It was the first Methodist Church built in Orange County.
- St. Thomas Episcopal Church is located on River Road in New Windsor, New York, a short distance off US 9W. It was established in 1818 on land bequeathed by Thomas Ellison. It is a small stone building listed on the National Register of Historic Places in 2006.
- St. Joseph Roman Catholic Church began as a mission church on Coffey Avenue in 1880. In August 2015 St. Joseph's parish merged with the parish of St. Thomas of Canterbury in Cornwall-on-Hudson.
- Ridgecrest Baptist Church on Blooming Grove Turnpike was begun in 1962.

== Geography ==
According to the United States Census Bureau, the town has a total area of 37.0 square miles (95.9 km^{2}), of which 34.8 square miles (90.1 km^{2}) is land and 2 square miles (5.2 km^{2}) (6.03%) is water.

The eastern town line, marked by the Hudson River, is the border of Dutchess County. Part of the northern town line borders the city of Newburgh. The remainder of the northern town boundary is with the towns of Newburgh and Montgomery.

Interstate 87, the New York State Thruway, is a major north–south highway. NY-207 is an east–west state highway.

== Communities and locations ==
- Beaver Dam Lake – a hamlet along the southern town line. It is also located in the towns of Blooming Grove and Cornwall
- Beaverdam Lake – a lake at the southern town line. It is surrounded by the hamlet of Beaver Dam Lake.
- Bulls Siding – a location between Rock Tavern and Little Britain (also called Bulls Switch)
- Clancyville – Quassaick Bridge – late 19th-century community built around once-thriving manufacturing mills located on the Quassaick Creek. Established by many Polish, Italian and other immigrants who built small homes, enlarging them as they prospered. The area was built on the early farm of John J. Clancy, who subdivided it into small building lots. Sometimes referred to as Ducktown by local residents, whose practice was to keep ducks and other poultry about their homes.
- Denniston – a hamlet north of Beaverdam Lake
- Firthcliffe Heights – a hamlet at the town line near the Cornwall Line
- Little Britain – a hamlet in the western part of the town on NY-207, first settled around 1724
- Machin's Battery – Capt. Thomas Machin was entrusted with the construction of fortifications on the Hudson River to prevent the British advance up the Hudson River. Machin's Battery of Twelve Guns, was Placed on the South End of Plum Point, to Support the Cheveaux-de-frize to Polopel's Island, 1777; however, this did not stop the British advance north to burn Kingston.
- Moodna – a historic location in the town
- Moodna Creek – (Murderer's Creek) – legend tells of a massacre of the Stacy family at Moodna Creek, also known as Murderer's Creek
- The National Purple Heart Hall of Honor is located on Route 300 in the town.
- New Windsor - The hamlet and census-designated place of the same name as the town.
- Plum Point – (Kowawese Unique Area) – a park, opened in the fall of 1996, located directly on the shore of the Hudson River. From this vantage exquisite views of the Newburgh Bay to the North and Cornwall bay to the south can be seen. Plum Point was an almost always occupied site from pre-historic man to the present.
- Rock Tavern – a hamlet near the western town line on NY-207. Rock Tavern is named for early landmark that was a gathering place for many years. The Tavern, owned and operated by John Humphrey in 1740, was located near the intersection of present-day Forrester Road. The tavern derives its name from a large boulder which formed its foundation. It was here that the plans were made for the organization of the present Orange County. Rock Tavern has its own post office (zip code 12575) with home delivery to the western portion of the Town of New Windsor and the southwestern corner of the town of Newburgh.
- Vails Gate – a hamlet south of the City of Newburgh. Formerly Mortinville and Tookers Gate, it was a site at which all major roads crossed. The roads were part of the early private turnpike system, which was served by a toll gate to collect tolls. Remnants of the former 19th century business community still exist including Lewis Hall on Rt 94 which served for many years as town hall meeting place prior to construction of 244 Union Ave., the old town hall. Vails Gate has its own post office (zip code 12584) with post office boxes, but no home delivery.
- Washington Lake – (1) a suburb of Newburgh located near (2) a small lake of the same name

== Demographics ==
Historical population
Census	Pop.	Note	%±
1790	1,819		—
1800	2,001		10.0%
1810	2,331		16.5%
1820	2,425		4.0%
1830	2,310		−4.7%
1840	2,482		7.4%
1850	2,457		−1.0%
1860	2,452		−0.2%
1870	2,482		1.2%
1880	2,576		3.8%
1890	2,621		1.7%
1900	2,392		−8.7%
1910	2,667		11.5%
1920	2,984		11.9%
1930	3,126		4.8%
1940	3,765		20.4%
1950	5,100		35.5%
1960	11,908		133.5%
1970	16,650		39.8%
1980	19,534		17.3%
1990	22,937		17.4%
2000	27,568		20.2%
2010	25,244		−8.4%
2020	27,805		10.1%
U.S. Decennial Census

As of the census of 2000, there were 22,866 people, 8,396 households, and 6,078 families residing in the town. The population density was 657.4 inhabitants per square mile (253.8/km^{2}). There were 8,759 housing units at an average density of 97.2 persons/km^{2} (251.8 persons/sq mi). The racial makeup of the town was 84.72% white, 6.76% African American, .27% Native American, 1.73% Asian, .05% Pacific Islander, 4.17% from other races, and 2.3% from two or more races. 11.1% of the population were Hispanic or Latino of any race.

There were 8,396 households, out of which 36.1% had children under the age of 18 living with them, 57.7% were married couples living together, 10.2% have a woman whose husband does not live with her, and 27.6% were non-families. 22.4% of all households were made up of individuals, and 8.7% had someone living alone who was 65 years of age or older. The average household size was 2.69 and the average family size was 3.19.

In the town, the population was spread out, with 26.5% under the age of 18, 7.1% from 18 to 24, 31.2% from 25 to 44, 22.7% from 45 to 64, and 12.5% who were 65 years of age or older. The median age was 37 years. For every 100 females, there were 97.6 males. For every 100 females age 18 and over, there were 93.8 males.

The median income for a household in the town was $51,113, and the median income for a family was $58,292. Males had a median income of $34,283 versus $30,044 for females. The per capita income for the town was $22,806. 5.9% of the population and 1.03% of families were below the poverty line. Out of the total people living in poverty, 52.8% are under the age of 18 and 7.5% are 65 or older.

== Climate ==
New Windsor has a Dfa Köppen climate classification (humid continental: hot summer subtype). It is situated in the temperate region of the northern hemisphere and has four distinct seasons.

== Education ==
Four school districts cover sections of New Windsor town: Newburgh City School District, Washingtonville Central School District, Cornwall Central School District, and Valley Central School District (Montgomery).

The majority of school-age children attend Newburgh schools, with a split in the subdivisions near Vails Gate (Butterhill, Forest Glen, The Reserve) between Newburgh and Cornwall. Far-southwestern New Windsor is served by Washingtonville.

Children in the New Windsor area attend a number of schools, including: Butterhill Day School (PK–K), Children S Country School (private, PK–4), Cornwall Central High School (public, 9–12), Newburgh Free Academy (public, 9–12), Heritage Junior High School (public, 6–8), Little Britain Elementary School (public, K–5), Little Harvard School (private, PK–K), McQuade Children's Services Kaplan Campus School (private, 2–11), New Windsor School (public, K–5), St. Joseph School (private, K–8), Temple Hill School (public, K–8), Vails Gate High Technology Magnet School (public, K–5), Windsor Academy (private, PK–3), Willow Avenue Elementary School (public, K–4), Lee Road (public, K–4), Cornwall Central Middle School (public, 5–8) and Woodland Montessori School (private, PK–8). Yeshiva Ohr Naftoli (private, 9–12 and undergraduate) is located in town, but the student body is from out of town, housed in a dormitory.

== Transportation ==
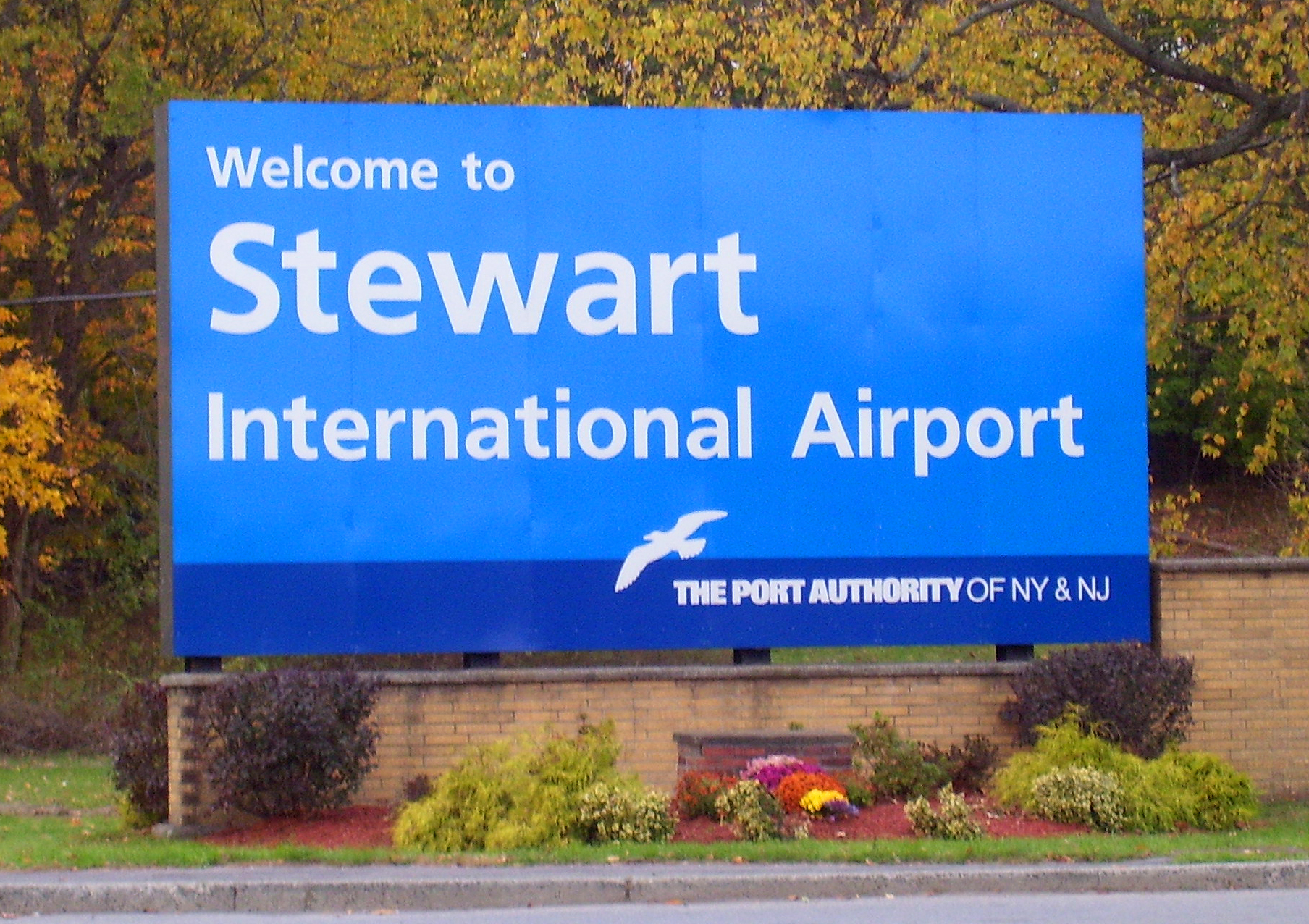
Stewart International Airport

Little Britain Road is one of the oldest in the town.

Stewart International Airport is located partially in New Windsor and partially in the town of Newburgh. Formerly Stewart Air Force Base, the airport is named after Capt. Lachlan Stewart, who skippered schooners and other sailing vessels about 1850–1870. Stewart was also a lumber merchant and later retired to a dairy farm. In 1930, his grandson, Thomas Archibald ("Archie") Stewart, persuaded his uncle, Samuel L. Stewart, to donate land at "Stoney Lonesome", to the city of Newburgh for an airport.

Stewart continued as part of the Strategic Air Command until the late 1960s or early 1970s when the Air Force turned the base over to the MTA for use as a cargo facility. The grand plan to create a jetport lead to the acquisition of over 8000 acres (32 km^{2}) of the present day buffer zone and the loss of many early farms and structures. During the late 1980s, through the efforts of the late State Senator Schermerhorn, the airport passed into the hands of the NY State Dept. of Transportation. Today, Stewart International in addition to its civilian capability, is the home base of the NY Air National Guard and United States Marine Corps Reserve MAG-49 Detachment Bravo.

There is a new entrance to Stewart International Airport, via New York State Route 747. Now for the first time, the airport can be accessed directly from the Interstates without encountering local traffic on the state roads.

== Notable people ==
- John Alsop (1724–1794) born in New Windsor, delegate to the Continental Congress
- Dr. Thomas Young (1731–1799) – born in Little Britain, member of the Boston Committee of Correspondence
- Dr. Joseph Young (1733–1797) – born in Little Britain, brother of Thomas, and writer of the first medical textbook in United States
- Col. Charles Clinton (1690–1773) – Lt. Col. of NY Militia during the French & Indian War, commanding a regiment at the assault on Fort Frontenac.
- Gen. James Clinton (1736–1812) – son of Col. Charles Clinton, James Clinton was with Gen Montgomery in command of NY Troops in the 1775 assault on Quebec 1775; in command of construction of Forts in the Hudson Highlands; member of NY legislature and Constitutional Convention
- Governor George Clinton (1739–1812) – son of Col. Charles Clinton, George Clinton served in the Continental Congress (1775), was a Brigadier General in the Continental Army (1776), was Governor of New York (1777), and vice-president of United States under Presidents Jefferson and Madison.
- Governor DeWitt Clinton (1769–1828) – son of Gen. James Clinton, NY Assembly 1798, mayor of New York City 1803, 1808–1809, 1811–1815; NYS Senate 1799–1802,1806–1811, Canal Commissioner 1816–1822, Governor 1817, 1820, 1824, 1826, Dewitt is best known for the Erie Canal and the NY State Canal System.
- Fletcher Mathews, Loyalist neighbor of Governor Clinton and brother of David Mathews, Mayor of New York City during its occupation by the British. Fletcher Mathews was ordered arrested by George Washington around the same time in June 1776 for suspicion of a "Scheme of Inlisting Men for the Kings Service". No evidence was found, and he was subsequently released. He was permitted to stay in the country upon the end of the war due both to his relationship from childhood to Governor George Clinton and to his wife Sarah Woodhull being the sister of General Nathaniel Woodhull who died in 1776 from wounds resulting from his capture by the British.
- John Trumbull (1756–1843) was an American artist of the early independence period, notable for his historical paintings of the American Revolutionary War, he lived in New Windsor in 1782-1783 helping the army.
- Edward Payson Roe (1838–1888) – novelist, Presbyterian minister and horticulturist who became one of the most popular writers of the early Gilded Age, selling nearly a million copies.
- William James Roe II (1843–1921) – novelist, essayist, poet and painter.
- Lee Woodward Zeigler (1868–1952) – painter and illustrator for various novels and short stories, including work by Sir Arthur Conan Doyle. He spent much of his life between his home in Baltimore and the Hudson Valley, painting many murals in both places, including two at Newburgh Free Academy. His eighteen-panel mural depicting "The Faerie Queene" at the Enoch Pratt Free Library was the largest library mural at its completion in 1945.
- Rev. Charles Uncles (1859–1933) – the first Black Catholic priest to be ordained in the United States. Born and raised in Baltimore. Worked and died at Epiphany Apostolic College.

== Industries ==
- ENAP is a lumber and building materials cooperative, offering sales support services to independent lumber dealers, headquartered in New Windsor.
- Devitt's Nursey & Supply on Route 32 hosts Eggbert, a talking animatronic egg the appears during the Christmas season from Black Friday until Christmas Eve
