= National Purple Heart Hall of Honor =

Site honoring Purple Heart recipients

Coordinates: 41°28′18″N 74°03′31″W

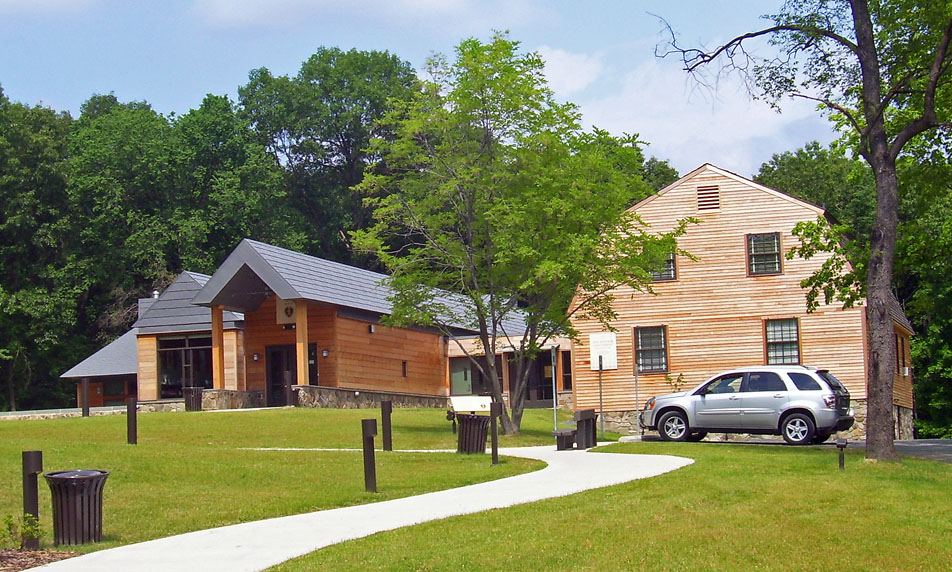
The National Purple Heart Hall of Honor

The National Purple Heart Hall of Honor is located along New York State Route 300 in the town of New Windsor, New York, United States. It is less than two miles south of the Town of Newburgh line and not far from the City of Newburgh. It is a Purple Heart national registry of military personnel that have been injured or killed during combat. In 1782, at Washington's Headquarters State Historic Site, his headquarters in the City of Newburgh, George Washington created the Badge of Military Merit to be given to enlisted men and non-commissioned officers for meritorious action. The museum is located at the New Windsor Cantonment State Historic Site, the last encampment of the Continental Army. It is the first and currently only museum dedicated to a U.S. military medal.

== Establishment of museum ==
On May 12, 1995, an article appeared in a Newburgh, N.Y. newspaper about the intent to build a Purple Heart museum in Enfield, CT. The article prompted Cornwall, N.Y. resident Patric Morrison to write a letter-to-the-editor, explaining why the museum should be located in the Newburgh area. Morrison contended that events at historic Washington's Headquarters/New Windsor Cantonment justified development of a Purple Heart facility at that site. Everett Smith, Publisher of the New Windsor Sentinel newspaper, agreed and became an advocate for the project.

On August 7, 1782, while at his Newburgh headquarters, Gen. George Washington created the Badge of Military Merit. This award was to recognize "singularly meritorious action" by enlisted soldiers, marking the first time that soldiers below the rank of officer were so honored. Sergeant Elijah Churchill of the 2nd Continental Dragoons, Sergeant William Brown of the 5th Connecticut Continental Line Infantry, and Sergeant Daniel Bissel of the 2nd Connecticut Line Infantry were summoned to Washington's Headquarters in the spring of 1783 to be awarded the Badge. After the Revolutionary War, the Badge fell into disuse until 1932 when it was revived, redesigned, and renamed the Purple Heart by Gen. Douglas MacArthur to honor the memory of George Washington on his 200th birthday. On May 28, 1932, one-hundred-thirty-seven World War I Army veterans who had served meritoriously received the first Purple Hearts at the New Windsor Cantonment, the final encampment of the Continental Army. In 1942, by Executive Order, President Franklin Roosevelt expanded award of the Purple Heart to include all branches of military service, and approved posthumous award for any military service member killed in combat on or after December 6, 1941. The Purple Heart now honors any member of U. S. military forces wounded, killed, or who died of wounds while serving under competent military authority in any capacity, retroactive to April 5, 1917.

Mr. Morrison's letter, and the Sentinel newspaper article, caused the Palisades Interstate Park Commission (PIPC) to pursue development of an appropriate facility at New Windsor Cantonment to commemorate the history of the Purple Heart and to recognize all recipients. The name, Purple Heart Hall of Honor, was chosen. The commission's Deputy Director, Kenneth Krieser, who had been awarded a Purple Heart as a result of combat duty in Vietnam, presented the PIPC plan at an annual conference of the Military Order of the Purple Heart in Norfolk, VA, winning support of its members and affirming that the name would become the "National" Purple Heart Hall of Honor.

Sentinel newspaper Publisher Everett Smith, Lt. Gen. James D. Hughes, USAF (ret.), New York State Senator William J. Larkin, and Veterans advocate Joseph Farina formed The Genesis Group in support of developing the Hall of Honor. Together, they worked for eleven years to help achieve this worthy goal.

On May 24, 2002, U.S. Senator Hillary Clinton (New York) announced that she had introduced a resolution (S. Con. Res. 113) to support efforts to create a National Purple Heart Hall of Honor.

New York State committed $4.1 million toward the planning, design, and construction of the Hall of Honor. Other financial support included $500,000 from the Military Order of the Purple Heart, $402,000 in federal HUD/VA funds, and many donations from veterans and their families. The Hall of Honor was dedicated by NY Governor George Pataki on November 10, 2006. Subsequently in 2019, $17 million in additional funds were provided to improve and expand the National Purple Heart Hall of Honor. This effort was spearheaded by Genesis Group member and New York State Senator William J. Larkin. Construction began soon after and the NPHHOH re-opened on Veterans Day in 2020.

== Mission ==
The mission of the Hall of Honor is to collect and preserve the stories of Purple Heart recipients from all branches of service and across generations in an attempt to ensure that all recipients are represented. Their stories are preserved and shared through a series of exhibits, live and videotaped interviews with veterans themselves, and the Roll of Honor, an interactive computer program detailing the stories of each individual.

== 2022 commemorative coins ==
In December 2020, the United States Congress passed Public Law 116-247, "To require the Secretary of the Treasury to mint coins in commemoration of the National Purple Heart Hall of Honor." The law provides for the minting of up to 50,000 gold $5 coins, 400,000 silver dollar coins, and 750,000 clad half-dollar coins combined in proof and uncirculated versions. Any profits raised from the sales of these coins will be donated to the National Purple Heart Honor Mission, Inc. to further its mission.

== See also ==
- Robert O. Binnewies
