= New Windsor Cantonment State Historic Site =

- New Windsor Cantonment
- U.S. National Register of Historic Places
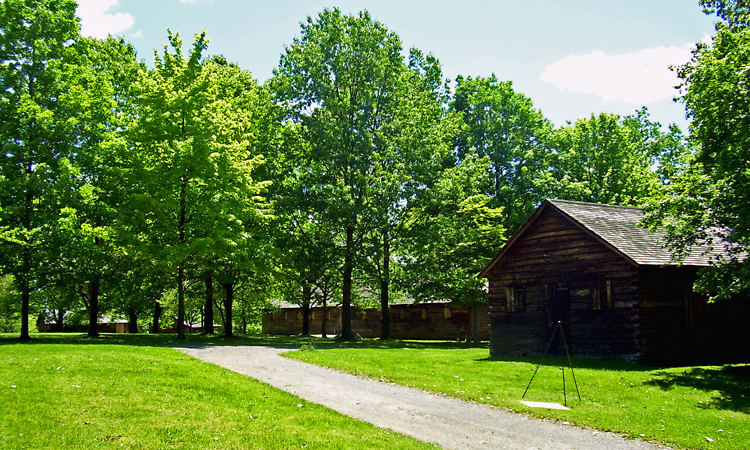
- Reconstructions of the Temple and another building.

- Location within New York Location within the United States
- Location: Temple Hill Rd., Vails Gate, NY
- Nearest city: Newburgh
- Coordinates: 41°28′22″N 74°03′36″W
- Area: 2,275 acres (921 ha)
- Built: 1782
- NRHP reference No.: 72000898
- Added to NRHP: July 31, 1972

The New Windsor Cantonment State Historic Site, also known as New Windsor Cantonment, is located along NY 300, north one mile of Vails Gate, in the Town of New Windsor, Orange County, New York. The site features a reconstruction of the Continental Army's final military encampment.

== 1780s ==
Between June 1782 and October 1783 7,000 troops were boarded here in 600 log huts, over 1,600 acres (650 ha). Although the Siege of Yorktown had ended most hostilities the year before, the British still occupied New York City and other ports, and George Washington believed that there was still strong sentiment in Britain for restarting the war and taking the colonies back. Thus it was necessary to keep the army here, within striking distance of New York and next to the vital Hudson River, until all the British forces were withdrawn. On April 19, 1783, Washington issued a cease fire order, officially ending the war for the Army.

== Newburgh Conspiracy ==
They were still uncertain times, however, as the Newburgh Conspiracy, where Washington persuaded his officers not to march on the Continental Congress and demand back pay at gunpoint, would demonstrate. The Temple, where he made his famous speech revealing his vision problems for the first time, is among the reconstructed buildings.

== Awards presented ==
The Purple Heart was first awarded here, and the National Purple Heart Hall of Honor was opened November 10, 2006 in recognition of that history.

== Post-war ==
After the war, the vacated huts were sold. Some of the stone walls on the site may be made from stones that came from the fireplaces of the original buildings. In 1963 the town acquired 167 acres (68 ha) of the original site, which it runs on the opposite side of Route 300 as the Last Encampment, and along with the National Temple Hill Association has kept it up as a monument. The Temple itself and its vicinity are owned by the New York State Office of Parks, Recreation and Historic Preservation but operated by the Palisades Interstate Park Commission.

== Site info ==
The site is open Wednesdays through Sunday from mid-April through October. Admission is free. Activities and events with reenactors in period costume are scheduled frequently.

== See also ==
- Knox's Headquarters State Historic Site
- Washington's Headquarters State Historic Site
