= New York metropolitan area =

- Megacity and metropolitan region
- New York–Newark–Jersey City, NY–NJ metropolitan statistical area New York–Newark, NY–NJ–CT–PA combined statistical area
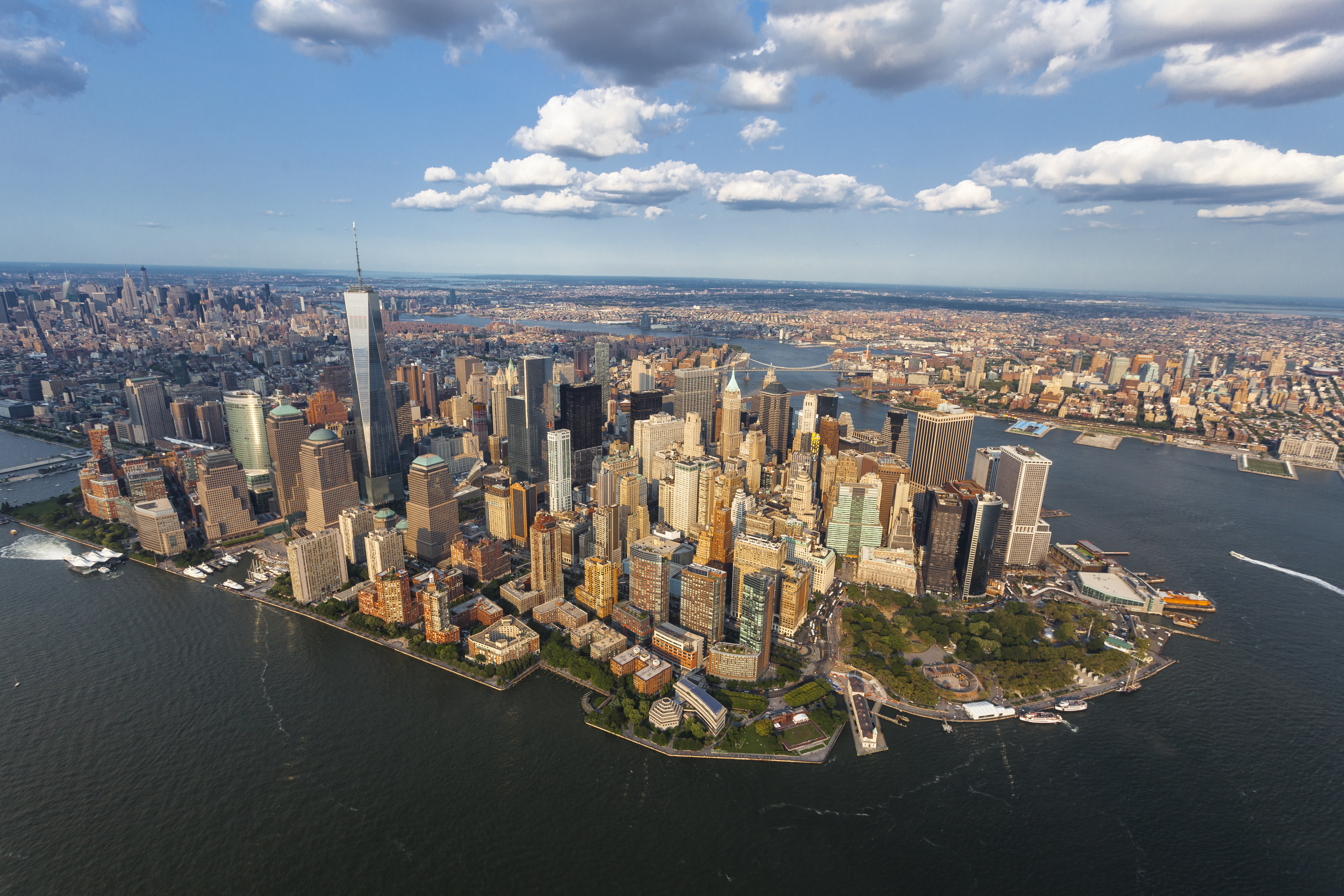
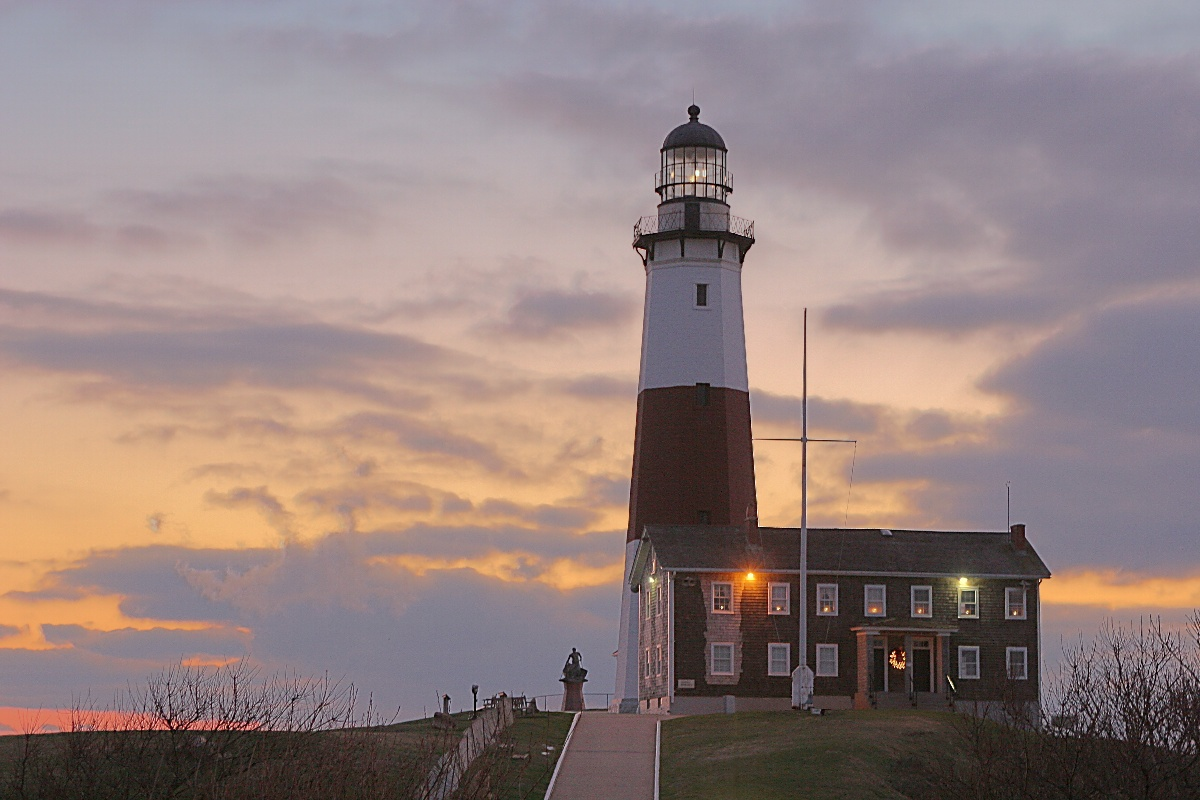
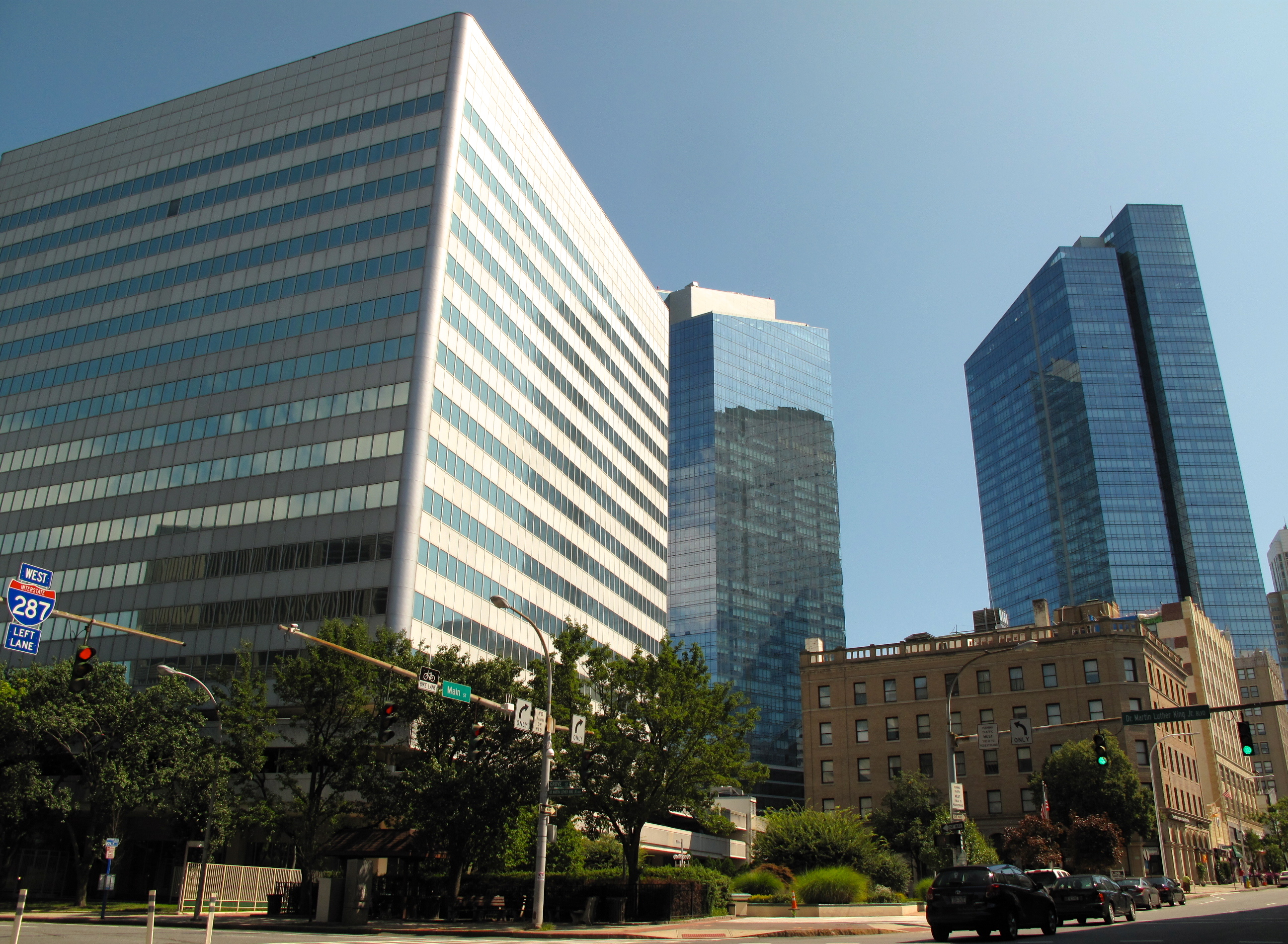
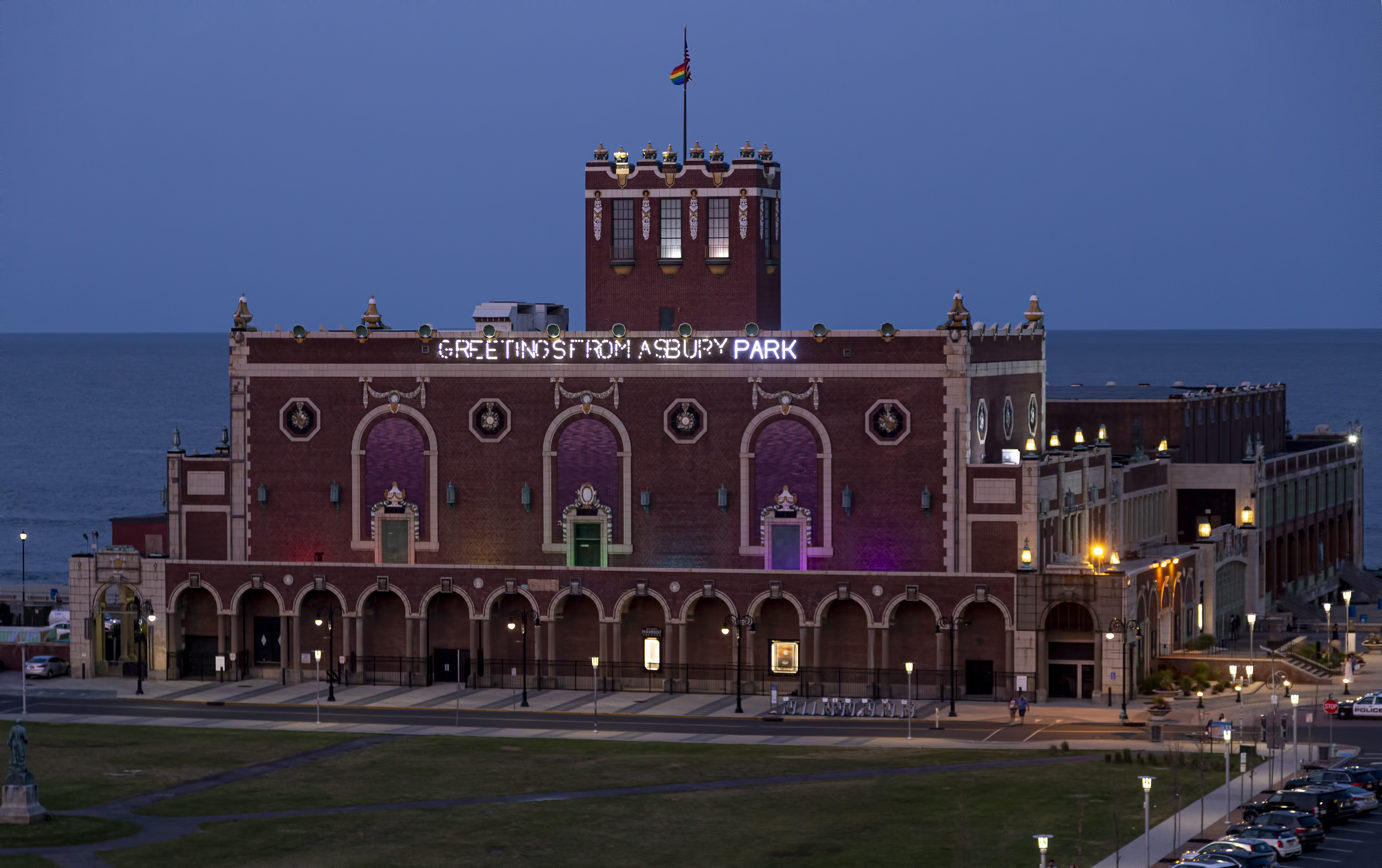
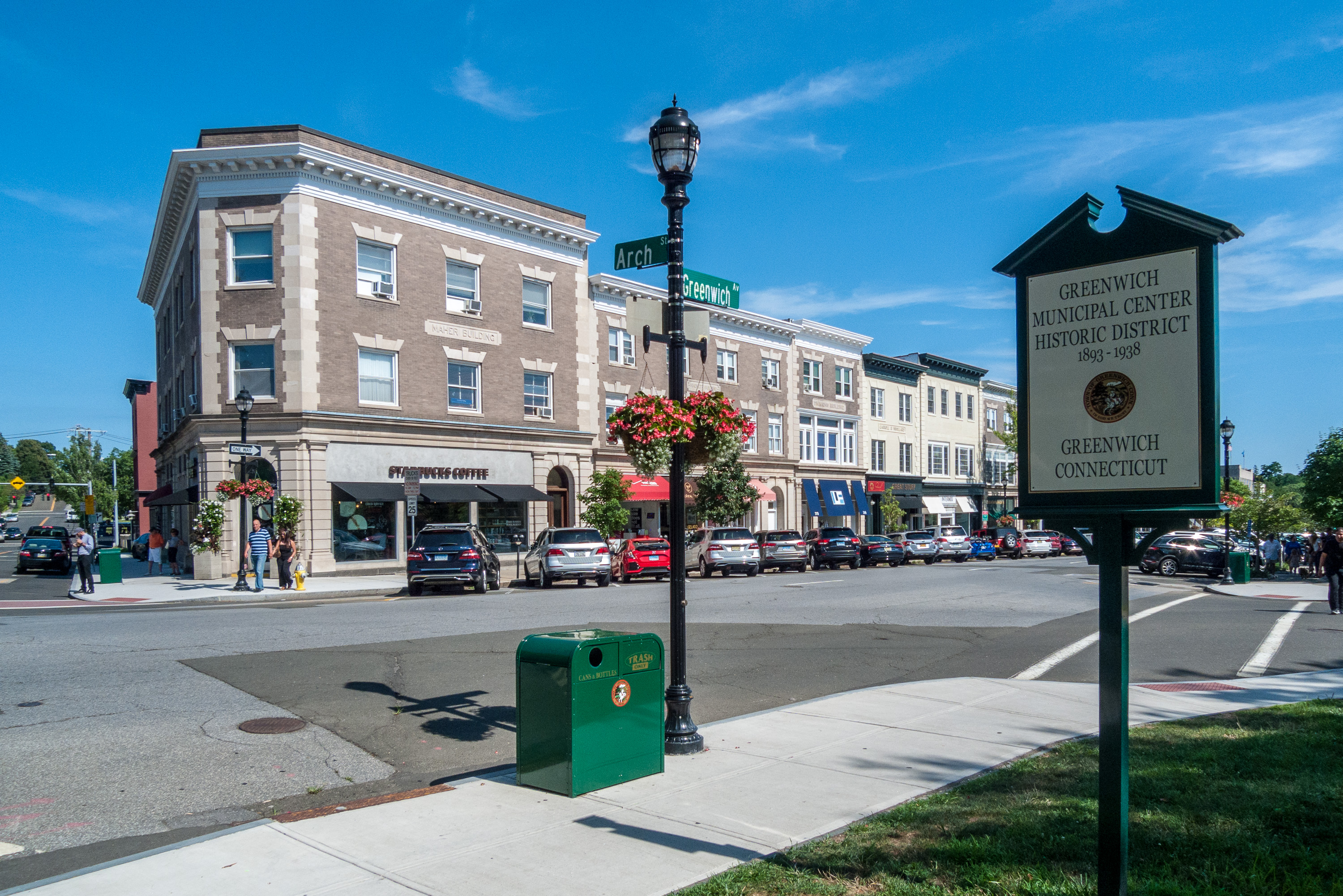
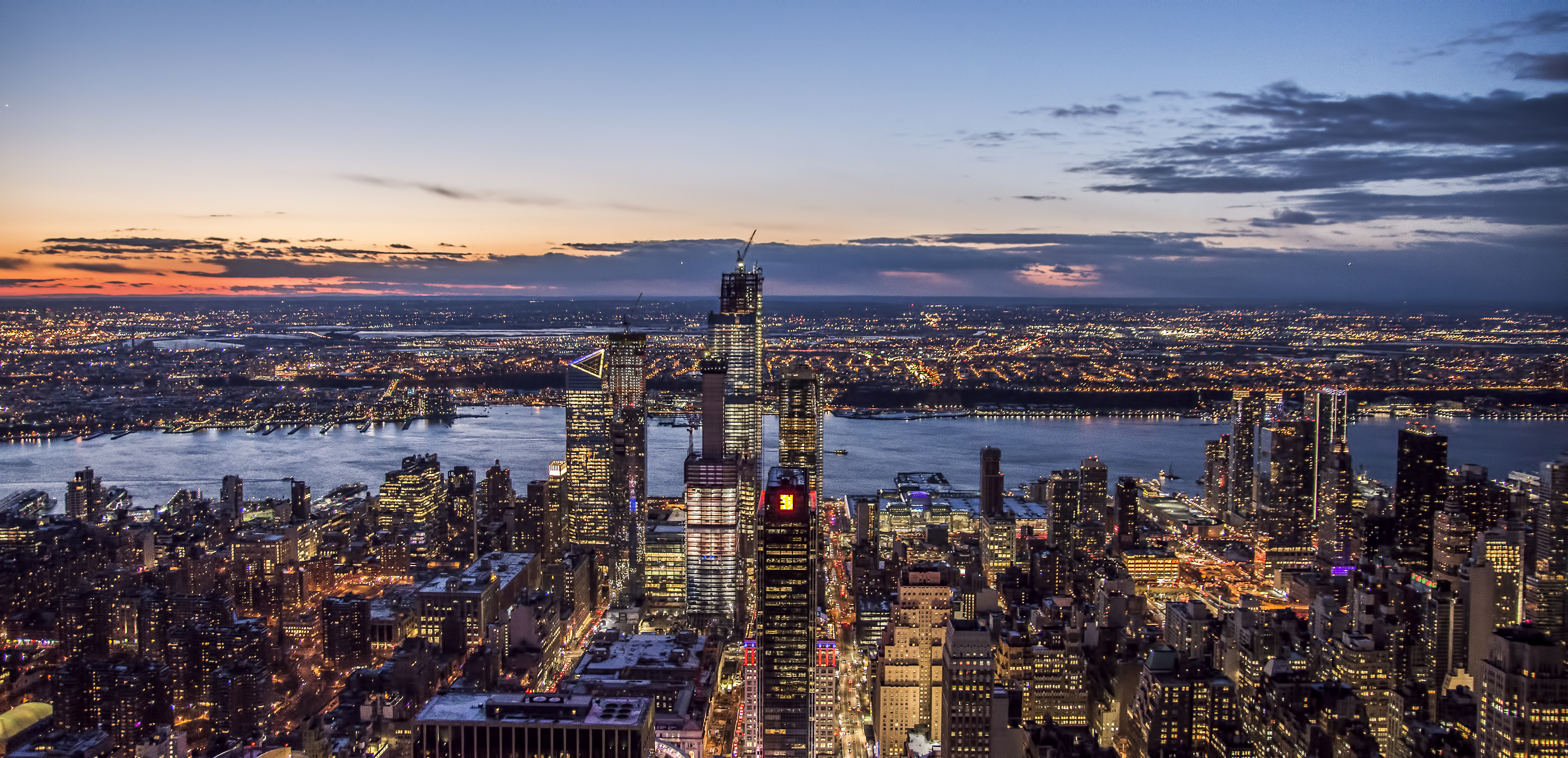
- From top, left to right: The Financial District of Lower Manhattan, the world's principal financial center; Montauk Point Light, on the East End of Long Island at sunrise; Downtown White Plains, in the Hudson Valley region; the Paramount Theatre, at Asbury Park Convention Hall at nightfall on the Jersey Shore; Greenwich, on Connecticut's Gold Coast, home to many wealthy financiers and hedge funds; and Midtown Manhattan overlooking Hudson County, New Jersey toward the west, across the Hudson River

Map of the metropolitan divisions (MDs) of the New York metropolitan area and the additional counties that make up the New York–Newark, NY–NJ–CT–PA Combined Statistical Area (CSA), as defined by the U.S. Census Bureau in 2021
New York–Jersey City–White Plains, NY–NJ MD
Nassau County–Suffolk County, NY MD
Newark, NJ–PA MD
New Brunswick–Lakewood, NJ MD
Rest of the New York–Newark, NY–NJ–CT–PA CSA
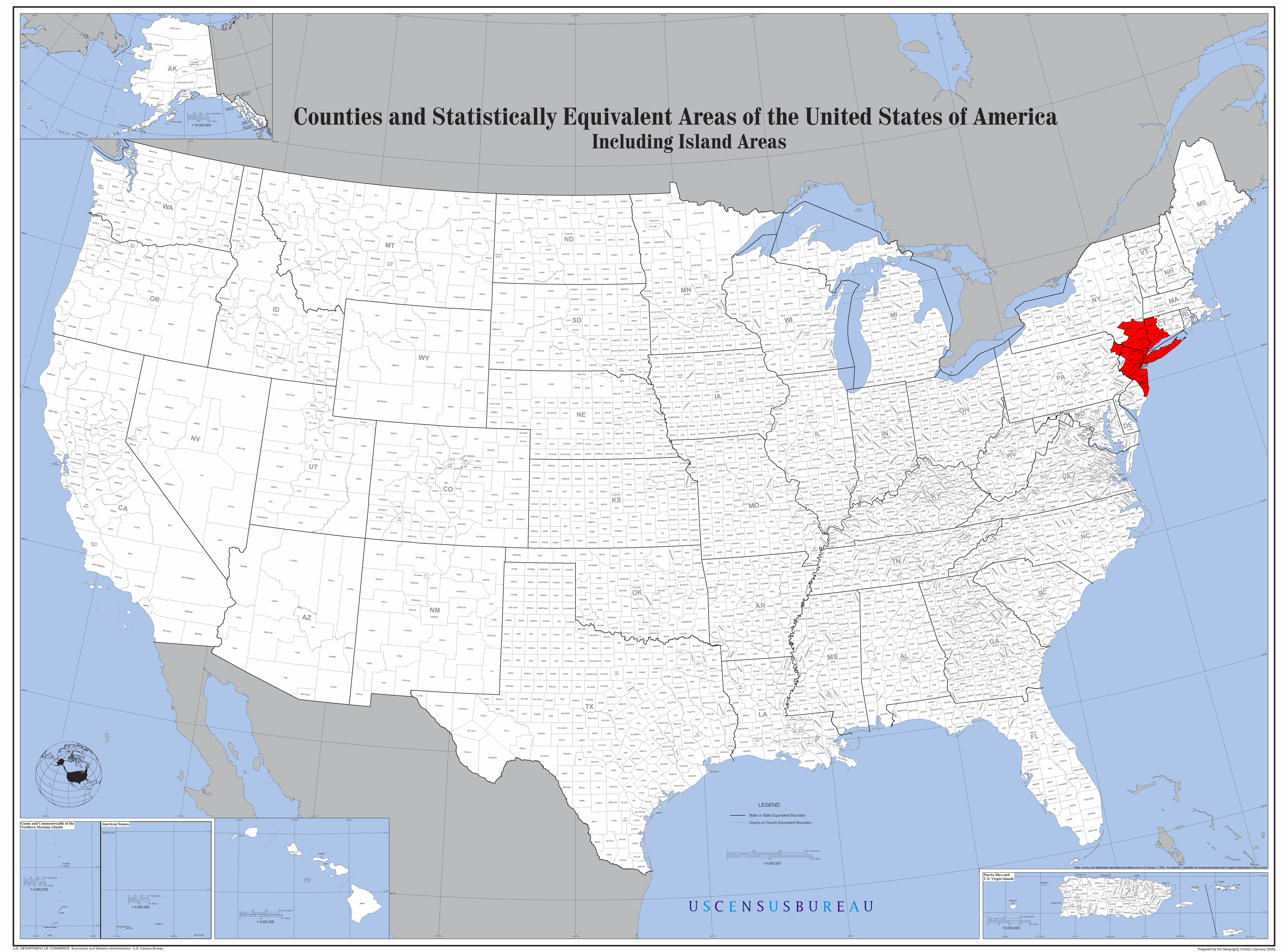
- Country: United States
- States: New York; New Jersey; Connecticut; Pennsylvania
- Core city: New York
- Satellite cities: List of satellite cities: Alpine; Asbury Park; Babylon; Basking Ridge; Bayonne; Beacon; Bedford; Brick; Bridgeport; Bridgewater; Brookfield; Brookhaven; Carmel; Clifton; Cortlandt; Danbury; Darien; Deerpark; Denville; Edison; Elizabeth; Englewood Cliffs; Fairfield; Flemington; Fort Lee; Franklin Lakes; Freehold; Glen Cove; Greenwich; Hackensack; Hamilton; Hawthorne; Hempstead; Hopewell Junction; Huntington; Islip; Jackson; Jersey City; Kent; Kingston; Lake Success; Lakewood; Long Beach; Long Branch; Mahopac; Mahwah; Mamaroneck; Marbletown; Middletown, NJ; Middletown, NY; Milford; Millbrook; Montauk; Montclair; Morristown; Mount Kisco; Mount Vernon; New Brunswick; New Haven; New Paltz; New Rochelle; Newark; Newburgh; Newtown; North Bergen; North Hempstead; North Salem; Norwalk; Nyack; Old Bridge; Orangeburg; Ossining; Oyster Bay; Paramus; Parsippany–Troy Hills; Paterson; Pawling; Peekskill; Perth Amboy; Plainfield; Pleasantville; Pleasant valley; Port Chester; Port Jervis; Poughkeepsie; Princeton; Putnam Valley; Red Bank; Rhinebeck; Ridgewood; Rutherford; Rye; Saugerties; Scarsdale; Sleepy Hollow; Smithtown; Sparkill; Stamford; Stroudsburg; Summit; Toms River; Torrington; Trenton; Union City; Union; Waterbury; Wayne; West New York; West Point; White Plains; Woodbridge; Wyckoff; Yonkers; Yorktown

Area
  - Urban: 3,248.1 sq mi (8,413 km^{2})
  - Metro: 6,139.6 sq mi (15,901 km^{2})

Population
  - Urban (2020): 19,426,449
  - Urban density: 5,980.8/sq mi (2,309.2/km^{2})
  - Metro density: 3,175.8/sq mi (1,226.2/km^{2})
  - Metropolitan statistical area (MSA) (2024): 19,940,274 (1st)
  - Combined statistical area (CSA) (2024): 22,342,624 (1st)
- Demonyms: Metropolitan New Yorker; Tri-Stater; Greater New Yorker

GDP
  - Metropolitan statistical area (MSA) (2024): US$2.443 trillion (2024)
  - Combined statistical area (CSA) (2024): US$2.675 trillion (2024)
- Time zone: UTC−05:00 (EST)
  - Summer (DST): UTC−04:00 (EDT)
- Area codes: 201, 203, 212, 332, 272, 347, 475, 484, 516, 551, 570, 609, 610, 631, 934, 640, 646, 718, 732, 845, 848, 860, 862, 908, 914, 917, 929, 973
- Highest elevation 4,180 ft/1,274 m (Slide Mountain (Ulster County, New York), in the Catskill Mountains). Lowest elevation 0 ft/0 m (sea level) at the Atlantic Ocean, Long Island Sound, and at Hudson River estuary waterways.

The New York metropolitan area, also called the Tri-State area and sometimes referred to as Greater New York or Metro New York, is the largest metropolitan economy in the world, with a gross metropolitan product of over US $2.6 trillion. It is also the largest metropolitan area in the world by urban landmass, encompassing 4,669.0 sq mi (12,093 km^{2}). Among the most populous metro areas in the world, New York is the largest metropolitan statistical area in the United States and the only one with more than 20 million residents, according to the 2020 U.S. Census.

The core of this vast area, the New York metropolitan statistical area, includes New York City and much of Downstate New York (Long Island as well as the lower Hudson Valley), northern and central New Jersey (including that state's eleven largest municipalities), and Southwestern Connecticut. Broader definitions of the metropolitan area include the satellite cities of Poughkeepsie, New York; Trenton, New Jersey; and New Haven, Connecticut and their suburbs. The urban region's combined statistical area also includes portions of Northeastern Pennsylvania. The New York metropolitan area's coastline constitutes one of the fastest-warming urban ocean shorelines in the world.

The New York metropolitan statistical area was in 2020 the most populous in the United States, with 20.1 million residents, or slightly over 6% of the nation's total population. The combined statistical area includes 23.6 million residents as of 2020. It is one of the largest urban agglomerations in the world. The New York metropolitan area continues to be the premier gateway for legal immigration to the United States, having the largest foreign-born population of any metropolitan region in the world, and is home to the largest Asian population outside Asia, at 2.6 million. The metropolitan statistical area covers 6,140 sq mi (15,903 km^{2}) while the combined statistical area is 13,318 sq mi (34,493 km^{2}), encompassing an ethnically and geographically diverse region. The New York metropolitan area's population is larger than that of the state of New York, and the metropolitan airspace accommodated over 130 million passengers in 2016.

Greater New York, known as the financial capital of the world, is also the hub of several industries, including health care, pharmaceuticals, and scientific output in life sciences, international trade, publishing, real estate, education, fashion, entertainment, tourism, law, and manufacturing; and if the New York metropolitan area were an independent sovereign state, it would constitute the eighth-largest economy in the world. New York County (Manhattan) is by a significant margin the most expensive U.S. county for the average home price per square foot, and produces the highest U.S. county GDP by both absolute and per capita measures. The New York metropolitan area is widely regarded as the most prominent financial, diplomatic, and media hub in the world. As of 2025, the New York metropolitan area has become the largest tech talent hub in the world.

The New York metropolitan area is known for its varied landscape and natural beauty, and contains five of the top ten richest places in America, according to Bloomberg. These are Scarsdale, New York; Short Hills, New Jersey; Old Greenwich, Connecticut; Bronxville, New York; and Darien, Connecticut. The New York metropolitan region's higher education network comprises hundreds of colleges and universities, including campuses of four Ivy League universities: Columbia, Princeton, Yale, and Cornell (at Cornell Tech and Weill Cornell Medicine); the flagship campuses of public universities systems at Stony Brook (SUNY), Rutgers (New Jersey), New Jersey Institute of Technology; and globally-ranked New York University, Rockefeller University, and Cold Spring Harbor Laboratory.

== Definitions ==
=== Metropolitan statistical area ===
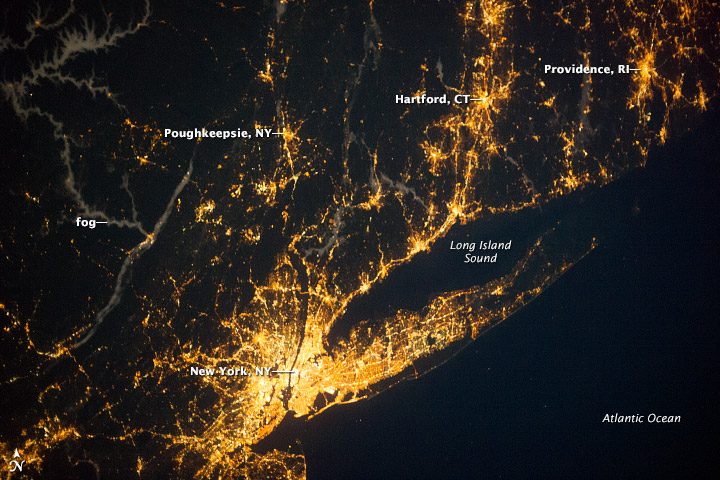
A nighttime view of the New York metropolitan area, with Long Island extending 120 miles (190 km) eastward from Manhattan, the area's central core

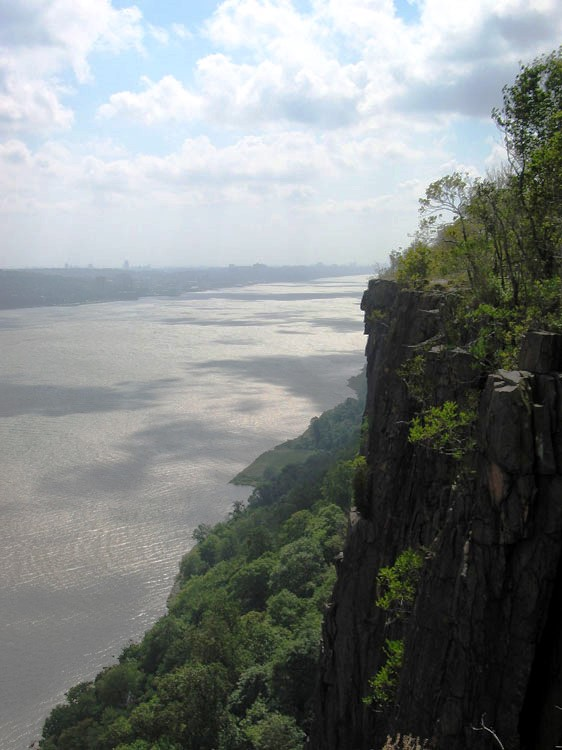
Part of the Palisades Interstate Park, the cliffs of the New Jersey Palisades in Bergen County, New Jersey, overlooking the Hudson River, The Bronx, and Upper Manhattan in New York City

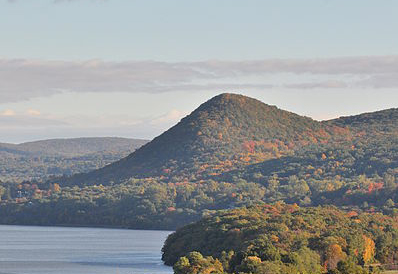
Sugarloaf Hill in Putnam County, from Bear Mountain Bridge

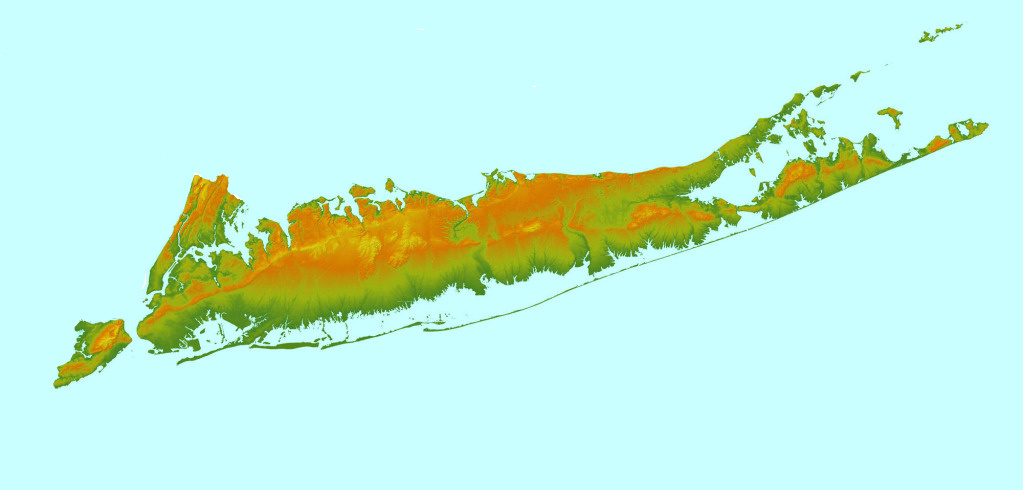
Enveloped by the Atlantic Ocean and Long Island Sound, New York City and Long Island are home to approximately 11 million residents combined

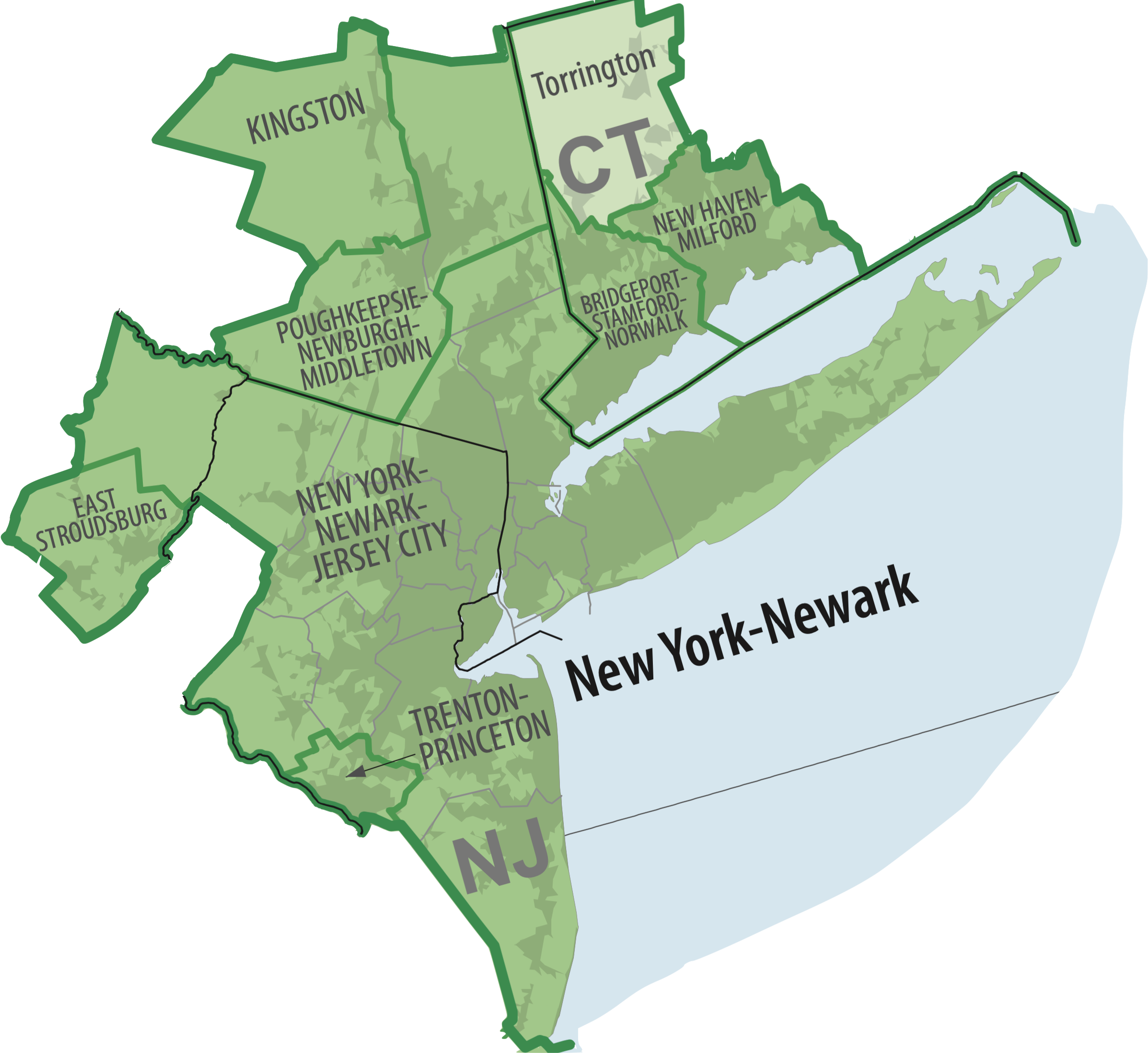
The New York-Newark, NY-NJ-CT-PA Combined Statistical Area as of March 2020

The U.S. Office of Management and Budget utilizes two definitions of the urbanized area: the metropolitan statistical area (MSA), and the combined statistical area (CSA). The MSA definition is titled the New York–Newark–Jersey City, NY–NJ Metropolitan Statistical Area, and includes a population of 19.9 million people by 2024 Census estimates, roughly 1 in 17 Americans and over 7 million more than the second-place Los Angeles Metro Area in the United States. The metropolitan statistical area is further subdivided into four metropolitan divisions. The 23-county metropolitan statistical area includes 10 counties in New York State (coextensive with the five boroughs of New York, the two remaining counties of Long Island, and three counties in the Lower Hudson Valley) and 12 counties in Northern and Central New Jersey. The largest urbanized area in the United States is at the heart of the metropolitan area, the New York–Jersey City–Newark, NY–NJ Urban Area, which had a land area of 3,248 square miles in 2020 according to the 2020 census. The New York State portion of the metropolitan area, which includes the five boroughs of New York City, the lower Hudson Valley, and Long Island, accounts for over 65 percent of the state's population.

The counties and county groupings constituting the New York metropolitan area are listed below, with 2024 Census estimates:

New York–Newark–Jersey City, NY–NJ Metropolitan Statistical Area (19,940,274)

- New York–Jersey City–White Plains, NY–NJ Metropolitan Division (12,172,495)
  - Kings County, NY (the borough of Brooklyn in NYC)
  - Queens County, NY (the borough of Queens in NYC)
  - New York County, NY (the borough of Manhattan in NYC)
  - Bronx County, NY (the borough of The Bronx in NYC)
  - Richmond County, NY (the borough of Staten Island in NYC)
  - Westchester County, NY
  - Bergen County, NJ
  - Hudson County, NJ
  - Passaic County, NJ
  - Rockland County, NY
  - Putnam County, NY
- Nassau County–Suffolk County, NY Metropolitan Division (2,928,347)
  - Suffolk County, NY
  - Nassau County, NY
- New Brunswick–Lakewood, NJ Metropolitan Division (2,561,540)
  - Middlesex County, NJ
  - Monmouth County, NJ
  - Ocean County, NJ
  - Somerset County, NJ
- Newark, NJ Metropolitan Division (2,277,892)
  - Essex County, NJ
  - Union County, NJ
  - Morris County, NJ
  - Sussex County, NJ
  - Hunterdon County, NJ
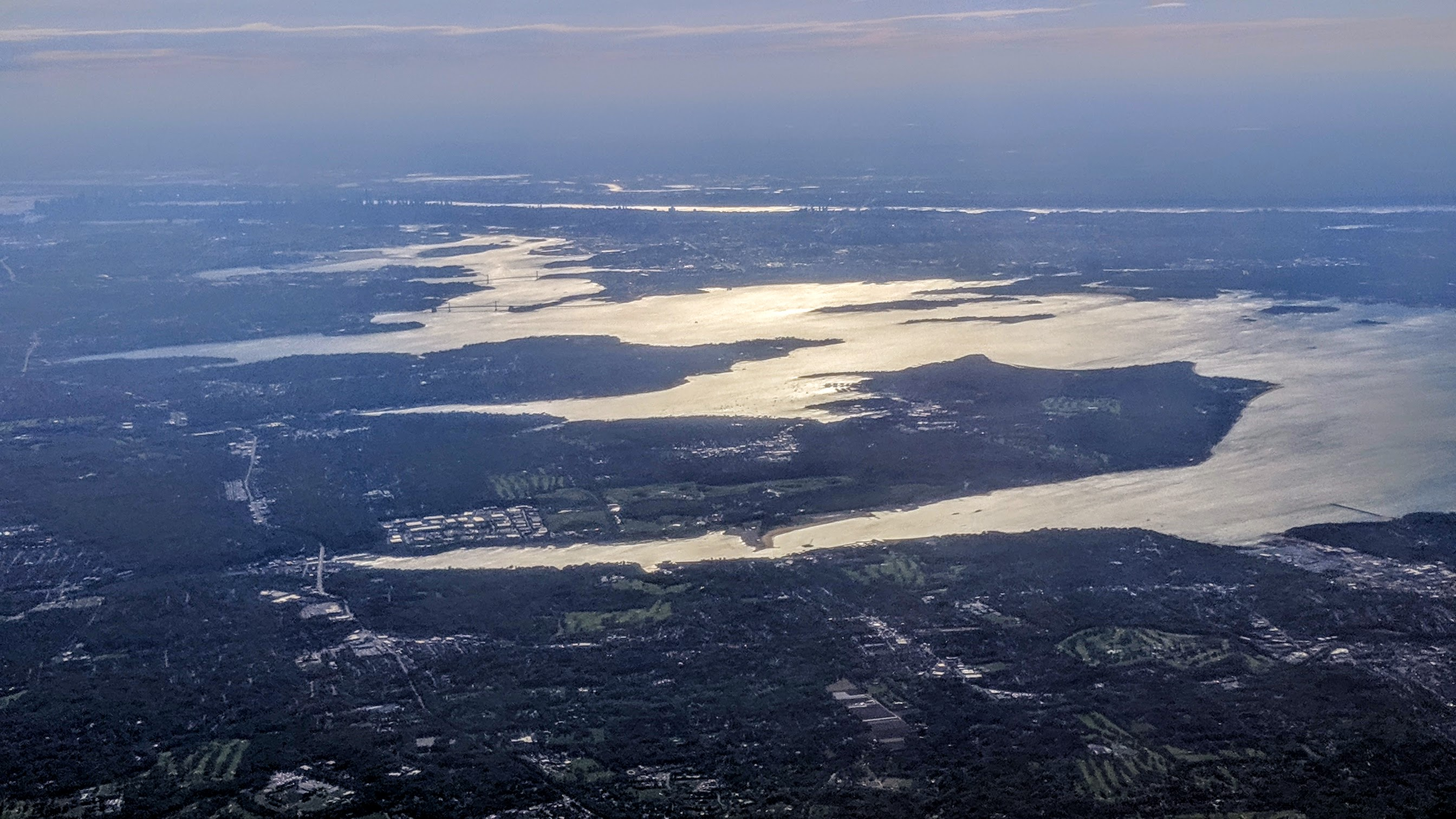

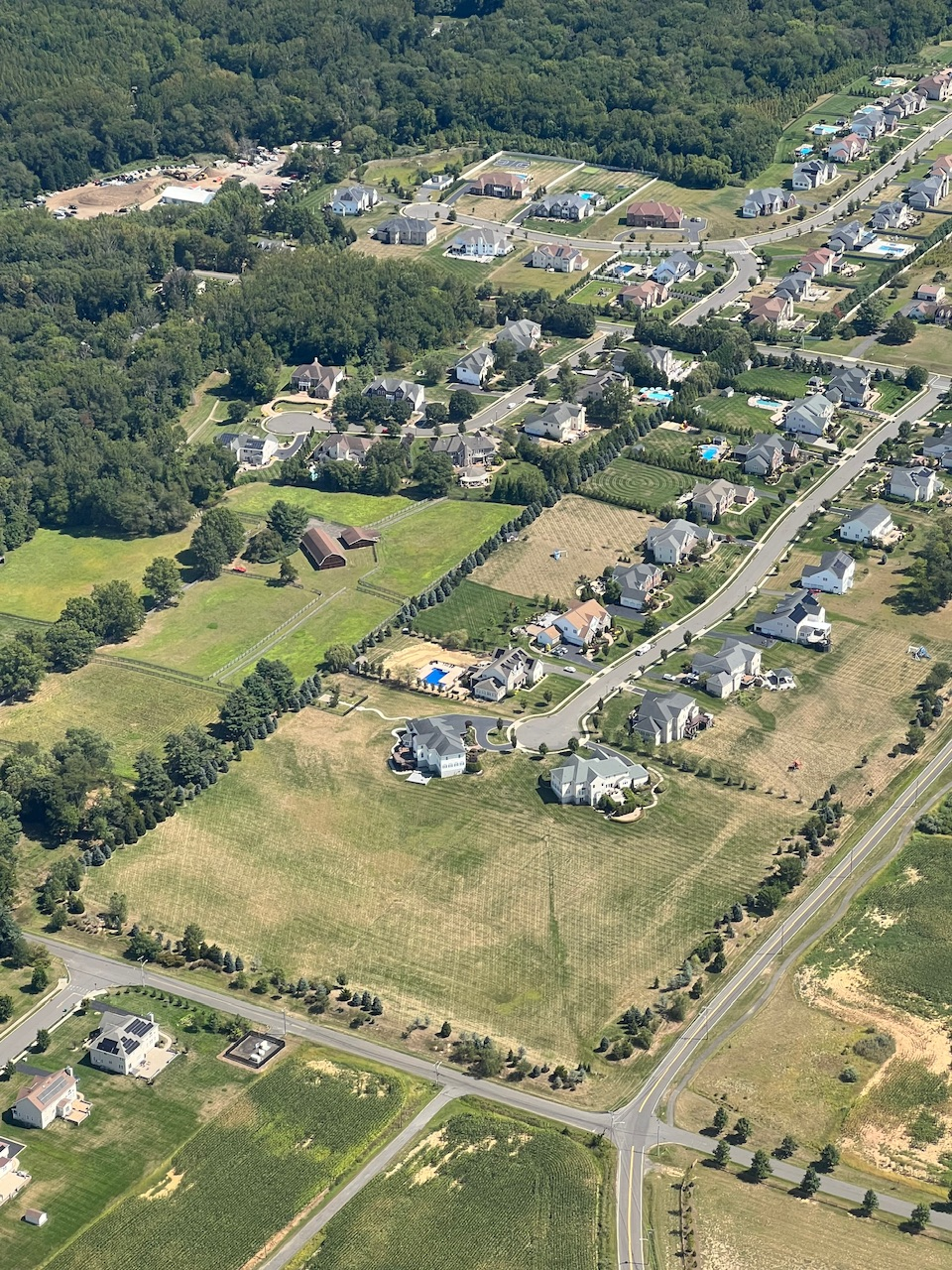
Nassau County on Long Island (top) is emblematic of the continuous sprawl making up the inner suburbs of New York City, in contrast with Monroe Township, Middlesex County, New Jersey (below), characteristic of an outer suburb, or exurb, of New York City, with a lower population density.

=== Combined statistical area ===
Combined statistical areas (CSAs) group together adjacent core-based statistical areas with a high degree of economic interconnection. The New York–Newark, NY–NJ–CT–PA Combined Statistical Area had an estimated population of 22.3 million as of 2024. About one out of every fifteen Americans resides in this region, which includes six additional counties in New York, New Jersey, and Pennsylvania and two planning regions in Connecticut. This area, less the Pennsylvania portion, is often referred to as the tri-state area and less commonly the tri-state region. The New York City television designated market area (DMA) includes Pike County, Pennsylvania, which is also included in the CSA.

In addition to the New York–Newark–Jersey City, NY–NJ metropolitan statistical area (MSA), the following core-based statistical areas are also included in the New York–Newark, NY–NJ–CT–PA CSA:

- Bridgeport–Stamford–Danbury, CT MSA (972,679)
  - Greater Bridgeport Planning Region
  - Western Connecticut Planning Region
- Hemlock Farms, PA μSA (62,376)
  - Pike County
- Kingston, NY MSA (182,977)
  - Ulster County
- Kiryas Joel–Poughkeepsie–Newburgh, NY MSA (711,730)
  - Dutchess County
  - Orange County
- Monticello, NY μSA (80,450)
  - Sullivan County
- Trenton–Princeton, NJ MSA (392,138)
  - Mercer County

== Geography ==
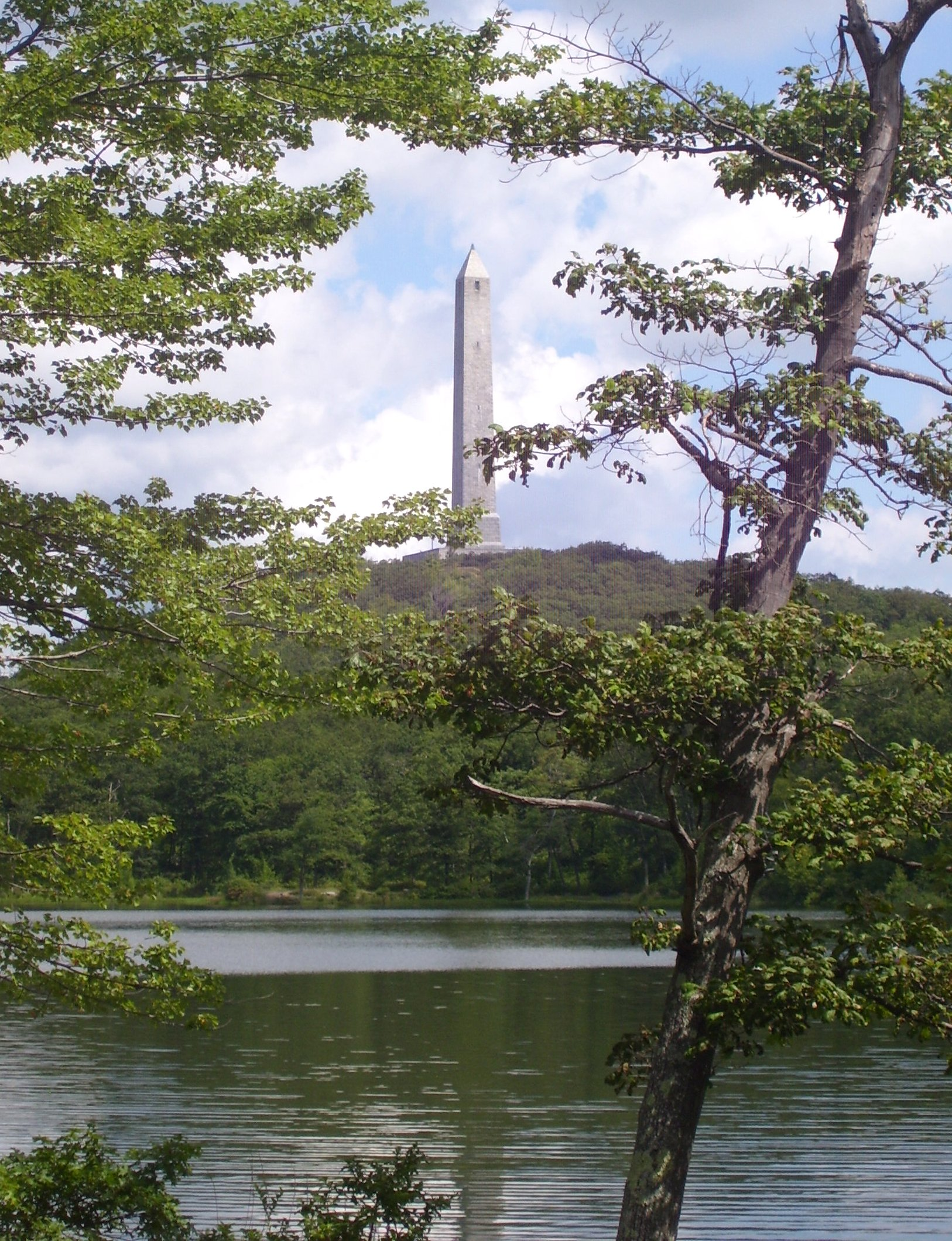
High Point Monument seen from Lake Marcia at High Point in Sussex County, New Jersey, the highest elevation in New Jersey at 1,803 feet (550 m) above sea level.

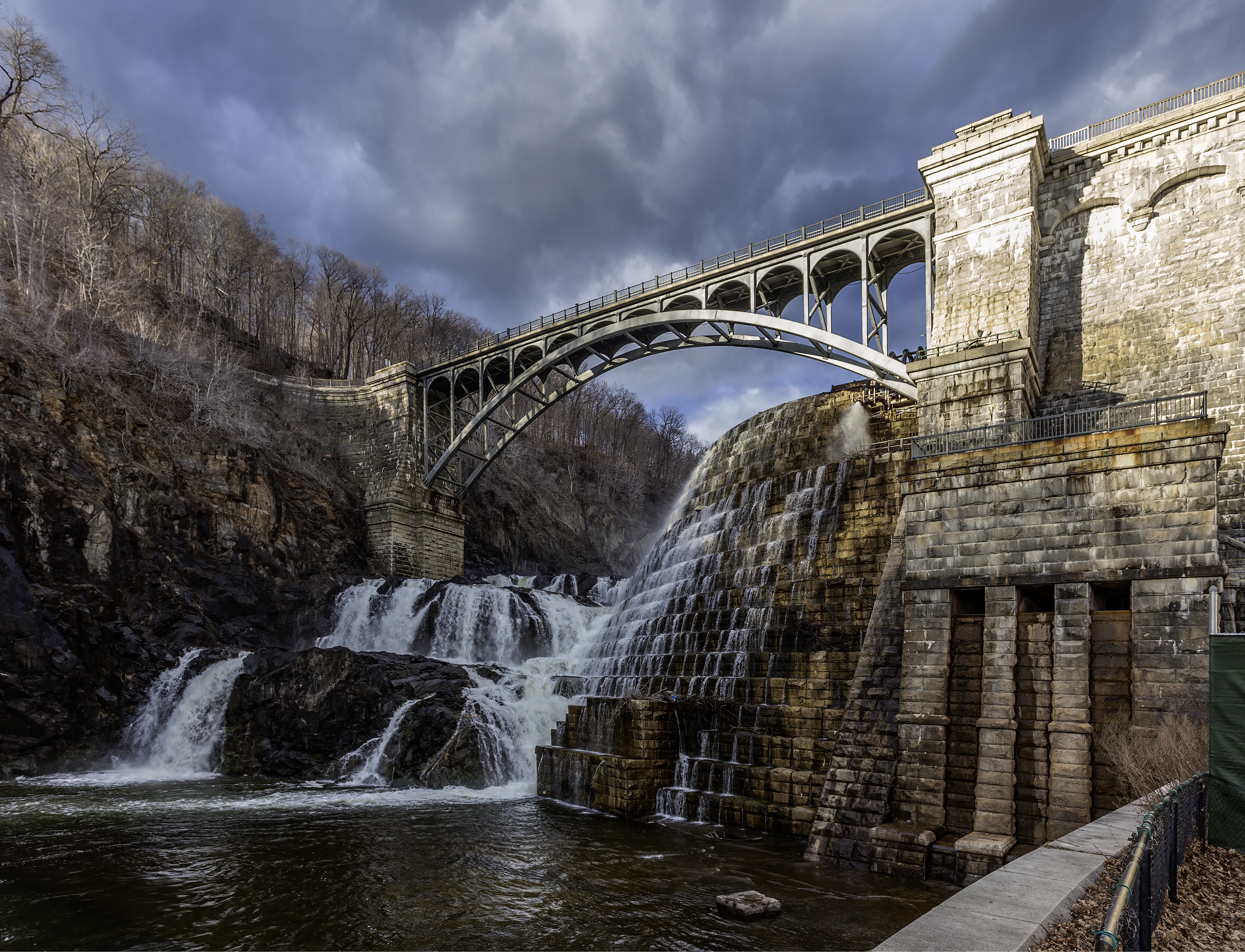
The New Croton Reservoir in Westchester County, provides fresh drinking water to New York City, via the New Croton Aqueduct. It is located approximately 22 miles (35 km) north of New York City, collecting water from all reservoirs in the Croton Watershed.

New York City Area Municipalities

The area is commonly divided into the following subregions:

- New York City (the primary urban center of the metropolitan region, comprising five boroughs, one of which is Manhattan, the geographical, cultural, and economic core of the entire metropolitan area)
- Central and eastern Long Island (Nassau and Suffolk Counties – separated by water from the rest of the region except New York City; not including Queens County or Kings County), which are concurrent with two of New York's five boroughs)
- North Jersey (northern portion of New Jersey)
- Central Jersey (middle portion of New Jersey)
- Hudson Valley (Lower Hudson Valley suburbs of Westchester, Putnam, and Rockland Counties; and Mid-Hudson exurbs of Dutchess, Sullivan, Orange, and Ulster Counties)
- Western Connecticut (Only Fairfield, New Haven, and Litchfield Counties are part of the region and separated by the state line)
- Southern and Eastern Poconos (Monroe, Pike and Wayne Counties in Pennsylvania)

All eight subregions are often further subdivided. For instance, Long Island can be divided into its South and North Shores (usually when speaking about Nassau County and western Suffolk County) and the East End. The Hudson Valley and Connecticut are sometimes grouped together and referred to as the Northern Suburbs, largely because of the shared usage of the Metro-North Railroad system.

=== Climate ===
Under the Köppen climate classification, New York City, western (and parts of eastern) Long Island, and the Jersey Shore experience a humid subtropical climate (Cfa), and New York is thus the northernmost major city on the North American continent with this climate type.

Much of the remainder of the metropolitan area lies in the transition zone from a humid subtropical (Cfa) to a humid continental climate (Dfa), and it is only the inland, more exurban areas far to the north and west such as Sussex County, New Jersey, that have a January daily average of 27 °F (−3 °C) or below and are fully humid continental; the Dfb (warm summer subtype) regime is only found inland at a higher elevation, and receives greater snowfall than the Dfa region. Much of Monroe and most of Pike County in Pennsylvania also have a fully humid continental climate.

Summers in the area are typically hot and humid. Nighttime conditions in and around the five boroughs of New York are often exacerbated by the urban heat island phenomenon, and temperatures exceed 90 °F (32 °C) on average of 7–8 days (on the immediate Long Island Sound and Atlantic coasts), up to in excess of 27 days (inland suburbs in New Jersey) each summer and may exceed 100 °F (38 °C). Normally, warm to hot temperatures begin in mid-May, and last through early October. Summers also feature passing thundershowers which build in the heat of the day and then drop brief, but intense, rainfall.

Winters are cold with a mix of rain and snow. Although prevailing winds in winter are offshore, and temper the moderating effects of the Atlantic Ocean, the Atlantic and the partial shielding by the Appalachians from colder air keep the New York area warmer in the winter than inland North American metropolitan areas located at similar or lesser latitudes including Pittsburgh, Cincinnati, and Indianapolis. Warm periods with 50 °F (10 °C)+ temperatures may occasionally occur during winter as well. The hardiness zone in the New York metropolitan area varies over a wide range from 5a in the highest areas of Dutchess, Monroe, and Ulster Counties to 7b in most of NYC as well as Hudson County from Bayonne up the east side of the Palisades to Route 495, the majority of Nassau County, the north coast of Monmouth County, and Copiague Harbor, Lindenhurst, and Montauk in Suffolk County.

Almost all of the metropolitan area receives at least 42 inches (1,070 mm) of precipitation annually, which is relatively evenly spread throughout the year, and many areas receive upwards of 50 in (1,270 mm). Average winter snowfall for 1981 to 2010 ranges from just under 25 inches (64 cm) along the coast of Long Island to more than 50 in (127 cm) in some inland areas, but this usually varies considerably from year to year. Hurricanes and tropical storms have impacted the Tri-State area in the past, though a direct hit is rare. Several areas on Long Island, New Jersey, and the Connecticut coast have been impacted by serious storm surges in the past. Inland areas have been impacted by heavy rain and flooding from tropical cyclones.

The New York metropolitan area averages 234 days with at least some sunshine and 59% of possible sunlight annually, accumulating 2,400 to 2,800 hours of sunshine per annum.

Climate data for New York (Belvedere Castle, Central Park), 1991–2020 normals, (Note: Mean monthly maxima and minima (i.e. the expected highest and lowest temperature readings at any point during the year or given month) calculated based on data at said location from 1991 to 2020.) extremes 1869–present (Note: Official weather observations for Central Park were conducted at the Arsenal at Fifth Avenue and 64th Street from 1869 to 1919, and at Belvedere Castle since 1919.)
Month	Jan	Feb	Mar	Apr	May	Jun	Jul	Aug	Sep	Oct	Nov	Dec	Year
Record high °F (°C)	72 (22)	78 (26)	86 (30)	96 (36)	99 (37)	101 (38)	106 (41)	104 (40)	102 (39)	94 (34)	84 (29)	75 (24)	106 (41)
Mean maximum °F (°C)	60.4 (15.8)	60.7 (15.9)	70.3 (21.3)	82.9 (28.3)	88.5 (31.4)	92.1 (33.4)	95.7 (35.4)	93.4 (34.1)	89.0 (31.7)	79.7 (26.5)	70.7 (21.5)	62.9 (17.2)	97.0 (36.1)
Mean daily maximum °F (°C)	39.5 (4.2)	42.2 (5.7)	49.9 (9.9)	61.8 (16.6)	71.4 (21.9)	79.7 (26.5)	84.9 (29.4)	83.3 (28.5)	76.2 (24.6)	64.5 (18.1)	54.0 (12.2)	44.3 (6.8)	62.6 (17.0)
Daily mean °F (°C)	33.7 (0.9)	35.9 (2.2)	42.8 (6.0)	53.7 (12.1)	63.2 (17.3)	72.0 (22.2)	77.5 (25.3)	76.1 (24.5)	69.2 (20.7)	57.9 (14.4)	48.0 (8.9)	39.1 (3.9)	55.8 (13.2)
Mean daily minimum °F (°C)	27.9 (−2.3)	29.5 (−1.4)	35.8 (2.1)	45.5 (7.5)	55.0 (12.8)	64.4 (18.0)	70.1 (21.2)	68.9 (20.5)	62.3 (16.8)	51.4 (10.8)	42.0 (5.6)	33.8 (1.0)	48.9 (9.4)
Mean minimum °F (°C)	9.8 (−12.3)	12.7 (−10.7)	19.7 (−6.8)	32.8 (0.4)	43.9 (6.6)	52.7 (11.5)	61.8 (16.6)	60.3 (15.7)	50.2 (10.1)	38.4 (3.6)	27.7 (−2.4)	18.0 (−7.8)	7.7 (−13.5)
Record low °F (°C)	−6 (−21)	−15 (−26)	3 (−16)	12 (−11)	32 (0)	44 (7)	52 (11)	50 (10)	39 (4)	28 (−2)	5 (−15)	−13 (−25)	−15 (−26)
Average precipitation inches (mm)	3.64 (92)	3.19 (81)	4.29 (109)	4.09 (104)	3.96 (101)	4.54 (115)	4.60 (117)	4.56 (116)	4.31 (109)	4.38 (111)	3.58 (91)	4.38 (111)	49.52 (1,258)
Average snowfall inches (cm)	8.8 (22)	10.1 (26)	5.0 (13)	0.4 (1.0)	0.0 (0.0)	0.0 (0.0)	0.0 (0.0)	0.0 (0.0)	0.0 (0.0)	0.1 (0.25)	0.5 (1.3)	4.9 (12)	29.8 (76)
Average extreme snow depth inches (cm)	5.8 (15)	7.9 (20)	4.4 (11)	0.4 (1.0)	0.0 (0.0)	0.0 (0.0)	0.0 (0.0)	0.0 (0.0)	0.0 (0.0)	0.0 (0.0)	0.4 (1.0)	3.7 (9.4)	12.3 (31)
Average precipitation days (≥ 0.01 in)	10.8	10.0	11.1	11.4	11.5	11.2	10.5	10.0	8.8	9.5	9.2	11.4	125.4
Average snowy days (≥ 0.1 in)	3.7	3.2	2.0	0.2	0.0	0.0	0.0	0.0	0.0	0.0	0.2	2.1	11.4
Average relative humidity (%)	61.5	60.2	58.5	55.3	62.7	65.2	64.2	66.0	67.8	65.6	64.6	64.1	63.0
Average dew point °F (°C)	18.0 (−7.8)	19.0 (−7.2)	25.9 (−3.4)	34.0 (1.1)	47.3 (8.5)	57.4 (14.1)	61.9 (16.6)	62.1 (16.7)	55.6 (13.1)	44.1 (6.7)	34.0 (1.1)	24.6 (−4.1)	40.3 (4.6)
Mean monthly sunshine hours	162.7	163.1	212.5	225.6	256.6	257.3	268.2	268.2	219.3	211.2	151.0	139.0	2,534.7
Percentage possible sunshine	54	55	57	57	57	57	59	63	59	61	51	48	57
Average ultraviolet index	2	3	4	6	7	8	8	8	6	4	2	1	5
Source 1: NOAA (relative humidity and sun 1961–1990; dew point 1965–1984)
Source 2: Weather Atlas.

Sea temperature data for New York
Month	Jan	Feb	Mar	Apr	May	Jun	Jul	Aug	Sep	Oct	Nov	Dec	Year
Average sea temperature °F (°C)	41.7 (5.4)	39.7 (4.3)	40.2 (4.5)	45.1 (7.3)	52.5 (11.4)	64.5 (18.1)	72.1 (22.3)	74.1 (23.4)	70.1 (21.2)	63.0 (17.2)	54.3 (12.4)	47.2 (8.4)	55.4 (13.0)

Climate data for White Plains, New York (Westchester Co. Airport)
Month	Jan	Feb	Mar	Apr	May	Jun	Jul	Aug	Sep	Oct	Nov	Dec	Year
Mean daily maximum °F (°C)	35.4 (1.9)	38.8 (3.8)	46.8 (8.2)	58.0 (14.4)	68.0 (20.0)	77.0 (25.0)	81.6 (27.6)	79.9 (26.6)	72.5 (22.5)	61.5 (16.4)	51.4 (10.8)	40.4 (4.7)	59.4 (15.2)
Mean daily minimum °F (°C)	21.1 (−6.1)	22.9 (−5.1)	29.3 (−1.5)	39.3 (4.1)	48.6 (9.2)	58.9 (14.9)	63.9 (17.7)	62.9 (17.2)	55.1 (12.8)	43.7 (6.5)	36.0 (2.2)	26.8 (−2.9)	42.5 (5.8)
Average precipitation inches (mm)	3.78 (96)	2.99 (76)	4.52 (115)	4.40 (112)	4.12 (105)	4.25 (108)	3.71 (94)	4.16 (106)	4.72 (120)	4.41 (112)	3.97 (101)	4.32 (110)	49.35 (1,255)
Average snowfall inches (cm)	8.9 (23)	8.8 (22)	5.4 (14)	1.0 (2.5)	0 (0)	0 (0)	0 (0)	0 (0)	0 (0)	0 (0)	.3 (0.76)	5.5 (14)	29.9 (76.26)
Average precipitation days (≥ 0.01 inch)	9.3	8.5	10.3	10.3	10.9	9.9	9.0	9.5	8.7	9.0	9.9	10.4	115.7
Average snowy days (≥ 0.1 inch)	3.6	2.7	2.0	.3	0	0	0	0	0	0	.3	2.3	11.2
Source: NOAA (1981–2010 normals)

Climate data for West Point, New York
Month	Jan	Feb	Mar	Apr	May	Jun	Jul	Aug	Sep	Oct	Nov	Dec	Year
Record high °F (°C)	71 (22)	72 (22)	86 (30)	96 (36)	97 (36)	102 (39)	106 (41)	105 (41)	105 (41)	92 (33)	82 (28)	72 (22)	106 (41)
Mean daily maximum °F (°C)	34.8 (1.6)	38.6 (3.7)	47.7 (8.7)	60.6 (15.9)	71.3 (21.8)	79.8 (26.6)	84.5 (29.2)	82.5 (28.1)	74.8 (23.8)	62.5 (16.9)	51.3 (10.7)	39.6 (4.2)	60.7 (15.9)
Mean daily minimum °F (°C)	20.1 (−6.6)	22.4 (−5.3)	29.4 (−1.4)	40.1 (4.5)	49.8 (9.9)	59.1 (15.1)	63.7 (17.6)	63.0 (17.2)	55.2 (12.9)	44.5 (6.9)	35.8 (2.1)	26.2 (−3.2)	42.4 (5.8)
Record low °F (°C)	−15 (−26)	−17 (−27)	−2 (−19)	12 (−11)	25 (−4)	39 (4)	40 (4)	35 (2)	28 (−2)	20 (−7)	5 (−15)	−16 (−27)	−17 (−27)
Average precipitation inches (mm)	3.73 (95)	2.97 (75)	3.93 (100)	4.00 (102)	4.15 (105)	4.59 (117)	4.59 (117)	4.54 (115)	4.47 (114)	4.99 (127)	4.33 (110)	4.27 (108)	50.55 (1,284)
Average snowfall inches (cm)	12.2 (31)	11.2 (28)	5.6 (14)	.2 (0.51)	0 (0)	0 (0)	0 (0)	0 (0)	0 (0)	0 (0)	.6 (1.5)	5.5 (14)	35.3 (89.01)
Average precipitation days (≥ 0.01 inch)	9.8	7.8	9.2	10.6	11.4	11.3	10.2	9.3	8.2	8.8	9.4	10.0	115.9
Average snowy days (≥ 0.1 inch)	5.1	3.1	1.6	.1	0	0	0	0	0	0	.3	1.7	11.9
Source: NOAA (1981–2010 normals)

Climate data for Bridgehampton, New York
Month	Jan	Feb	Mar	Apr	May	Jun	Jul	Aug	Sep	Oct	Nov	Dec	Year
Record high °F (°C)	67 (19)	63 (17)	79 (26)	92 (33)	93 (34)	95 (35)	102 (39)	100 (38)	94 (34)	88 (31)	75 (24)	70 (21)	102 (39)
Mean daily maximum °F (°C)	38.9 (3.8)	40.5 (4.7)	47.0 (8.3)	56.3 (13.5)	66.1 (18.9)	75.2 (24.0)	81.0 (27.2)	80.2 (26.8)	73.5 (23.1)	63.2 (17.3)	53.7 (12.1)	43.8 (6.6)	60.0 (15.6)
Mean daily minimum °F (°C)	23.8 (−4.6)	25.5 (−3.6)	31.0 (−0.6)	39.6 (4.2)	48.2 (9.0)	58.3 (14.6)	64.0 (17.8)	63.2 (17.3)	56.0 (13.3)	45.1 (7.3)	37.5 (3.1)	28.6 (−1.9)	43.4 (6.3)
Record low °F (°C)	−11 (−24)	−12 (−24)	6 (−14)	14 (−10)	29 (−2)	36 (2)	46 (8)	41 (5)	35 (2)	22 (−6)	10 (−12)	−6 (−21)	−12 (−24)
Average precipitation inches (mm)	4.00 (102)	3.72 (94)	5.07 (129)	4.52 (115)	3.78 (96)	4.12 (105)	3.45 (88)	3.92 (100)	4.60 (117)	4.20 (107)	4.37 (111)	4.38 (111)	50.13 (1,275)
Average snowfall inches (cm)	7.8 (20)	8.4 (21)	5.0 (13)	.9 (2.3)	0 (0)	0 (0)	0 (0)	0 (0)	0 (0)	0 (0)	.7 (1.8)	3.9 (9.9)	26.7 (68)
Average precipitation days (≥ 0.01 inch)	9.9	8.9	10.2	10.5	10.7	8.8	7.9	7.7	8.1	8.4	9.5	10.0	110.6
Average snowy days (≥ 0.1 inch)	3.2	3.0	1.9	.3	0	0	0	0	0	0	.2	1.7	10.3
Source: NOAA (1981–2010 normals)

Climate data for Newark, New Jersey (Newark Liberty Int'l)
Month	Jan	Feb	Mar	Apr	May	Jun	Jul	Aug	Sep	Oct	Nov	Dec	Year
Record high °F (°C)	74 (23)	76 (24)	89 (32)	97 (36)	99 (37)	102 (39)	108 (42)	105 (41)	105 (41)	93 (34)	85 (29)	76 (24)	108 (42)
Mean daily maximum °F (°C)	38.8 (3.8)	42.3 (5.7)	50.7 (10.4)	62.0 (16.7)	72.1 (22.3)	81.5 (27.5)	86.0 (30.0)	84.0 (28.9)	76.7 (24.8)	65.3 (18.5)	54.6 (12.6)	43.5 (6.4)	63.1 (17.3)
Mean daily minimum °F (°C)	24.5 (−4.2)	26.9 (−2.8)	33.6 (0.9)	43.7 (6.5)	53.3 (11.8)	63.3 (17.4)	68.7 (20.4)	67.5 (19.7)	59.7 (15.4)	48.0 (8.9)	39.0 (3.9)	29.6 (−1.3)	46.5 (8.1)
Record low °F (°C)	−8 (−22)	−14 (−26)	6 (−14)	16 (−9)	33 (1)	41 (5)	51 (11)	45 (7)	35 (2)	25 (−4)	12 (−11)	−8 (−22)	−14 (−26)
Average precipitation inches (mm)	3.53 (90)	2.88 (73)	4.18 (106)	4.20 (107)	4.09 (104)	4.02 (102)	4.76 (121)	3.70 (94)	3.82 (97)	3.60 (91)	3.65 (93)	3.80 (97)	46.24 (1,174)
Average snowfall inches (cm)	8.9 (23)	9.5 (24)	4.4 (11)	.9 (2.3)	0 (0)	0 (0)	0 (0)	0 (0)	0 (0)	0 (0)	.4 (1.0)	5.4 (14)	29.5 (75.3)
Average precipitation days (≥ 0.01 inch)	10.4	9.8	11.0	11.5	11.3	11.0	10.1	9.7	8.6	8.7	9.5	10.6	122.1
Average snowy days (≥ 0.1 inch)	5.0	3.7	2.4	.4	0	0	0	0	0	0	.4	2.9	14.7
Source: NOAA (1981–2010 normals)

Climate data for Morristown, New Jersey
Month	Jan	Feb	Mar	Apr	May	Jun	Jul	Aug	Sep	Oct	Nov	Dec	Year
Mean daily maximum °F (°C)	38 (3)	41 (5)	50 (10)	61 (16)	71 (22)	80 (27)	85 (29)	83 (28)	75 (24)	65 (18)	54 (12)	43 (6)	62 (17)
Mean daily minimum °F (°C)	18 (−8)	19 (−7)	27 (−3)	36 (2)	46 (8)	54 (12)	59 (15)	58 (14)	51 (11)	39 (4)	32 (0)	23 (−5)	39 (4)
Average precipitation inches (mm)	4.50 (114)	3.00 (76)	4.41 (112)	4.64 (118)	5.09 (129)	4.40 (112)	5.29 (134)	4.37 (111)	5.33 (135)	4.17 (106)	4.37 (111)	4.10 (104)	53.67 (1,363)

Climate data for Toms River, New Jersey
Month	Jan	Feb	Mar	Apr	May	Jun	Jul	Aug	Sep	Oct	Nov	Dec	Year
Record high °F (°C)	75 (24)	75 (24)	87 (31)	97 (36)	99 (37)	102 (39)	105 (41)	105 (41)	103 (39)	91 (33)	85 (29)	75 (24)	105 (41)
Mean daily maximum °F (°C)	41 (5)	44 (7)	51 (11)	61 (16)	71 (22)	80 (27)	85 (29)	83 (28)	77 (25)	67 (19)	57 (14)	46 (8)	64 (18)
Mean daily minimum °F (°C)	22 (−6)	24 (−4)	30 (−1)	39 (4)	49 (9)	59 (15)	64 (18)	62 (17)	55 (13)	43 (6)	35 (2)	27 (−3)	42 (6)
Record low °F (°C)	−24 (−31)	−24 (−31)	−4 (−20)	12 (−11)	27 (−3)	37 (3)	43 (6)	38 (3)	31 (−1)	20 (−7)	9 (−13)	−12 (−24)	−24 (−31)
Average precipitation inches (mm)	3.92 (100)	3.30 (84)	4.79 (122)	4.07 (103)	3.73 (95)	3.80 (97)	4.60 (117)	4.69 (119)	3.79 (96)	3.90 (99)	4.11 (104)	4.51 (115)	49.8 (1,260)
Average snowfall inches (cm)	7.01 (17.8)	5.99 (15.2)	5.00 (12.7)	0.98 (2.5)	0 (0)	0 (0)	0 (0)	0 (0)	0 (0)	0 (0)	0.98 (2.5)	4.02 (10.2)	23.98 (60.9)
Average precipitation days	11	10	11	11	11	10	9	9	8	8	10	10	118
Average snowy days	4	3	2	.5	0	0	0	0	0	0	.2	2	11.7
Mean monthly sunshine hours	155.0	155.4	201.5	216.0	244.9	270.0	275.9	260.4	219.0	204.6	156.0	136.4	2,495.1
Source: weather.com

Climate data for Bridgeport, Connecticut (Sikorsky Airport)
Month	Jan	Feb	Mar	Apr	May	Jun	Jul	Aug	Sep	Oct	Nov	Dec	Year
Record high °F (°C)	68 (20)	67 (19)	84 (29)	91 (33)	97 (36)	97 (36)	103 (39)	100 (38)	99 (37)	89 (32)	78 (26)	76 (24)	103 (39)
Mean daily maximum °F (°C)	37.1 (2.8)	39.7 (4.3)	47.2 (8.4)	57.6 (14.2)	67.6 (19.8)	77.0 (25.0)	82.1 (27.8)	80.8 (27.1)	74.0 (23.3)	63.2 (17.3)	53.1 (11.7)	42.3 (5.7)	60.1 (15.6)
Mean daily minimum °F (°C)	23.1 (−4.9)	25.2 (−3.8)	31.4 (−0.3)	41.0 (5.0)	50.5 (10.3)	60.2 (15.7)	66.3 (19.1)	65.6 (18.7)	58.0 (14.4)	46.4 (8.0)	37.9 (3.3)	28.4 (−2.0)	44.5 (6.9)
Record low °F (°C)	−7 (−22)	−5 (−21)	4 (−16)	18 (−8)	31 (−1)	41 (5)	49 (9)	44 (7)	36 (2)	26 (−3)	16 (−9)	−4 (−20)	−7 (−22)
Average precipitation inches (mm)	3.10 (79)	2.79 (71)	4.04 (103)	4.13 (105)	3.80 (97)	3.64 (92)	3.46 (88)	3.96 (101)	3.48 (88)	3.64 (92)	3.39 (86)	3.33 (85)	42.75 (1,086)
Average snowfall inches (cm)	9.2 (23)	8.2 (21)	5.4 (14)	.9 (2.3)	0 (0)	0 (0)	0 (0)	0 (0)	0 (0)	0 (0)	.7 (1.8)	5.5 (14)	30.0 (76)
Average precipitation days (≥ 0.01 inch)	10.9	9.7	11.3	11.0	11.8	11.1	8.9	8.9	8.2	8.8	10.0	11.1	121.7
Average snowy days (≥ 0.1 inch)	5.0	3.6	2.4	.3	0	0	0	0	0	0	.5	3.1	15.0
Source: NOAA (1981–2010 normals)

Climate data for Danbury, Connecticut
Month	Jan	Feb	Mar	Apr	May	Jun	Jul	Aug	Sep	Oct	Nov	Dec	Year
Record high °F (°C)	71 (22)	77 (25)	92 (33)	95 (35)	97 (36)	105 (41)	106 (41)	104 (40)	100 (38)	91 (33)	82 (28)	80 (27)	106 (41)
Mean daily maximum °F (°C)	35.6 (2.0)	39.6 (4.2)	48.7 (9.3)	61.0 (16.1)	71.9 (22.2)	80.8 (27.1)	84.9 (29.4)	82.5 (28.1)	74.5 (23.6)	62.7 (17.1)	51.3 (10.7)	39.9 (4.4)	61.1 (16.2)
Mean daily minimum °F (°C)	19.2 (−7.1)	21.8 (−5.7)	28.6 (−1.9)	38.9 (3.8)	48.4 (9.1)	58.5 (14.7)	63.4 (17.4)	61.8 (16.6)	53.4 (11.9)	41.8 (5.4)	33.6 (0.9)	24.6 (−4.1)	41.2 (5.1)
Record low °F (°C)	−18 (−28)	−16 (−27)	−9 (−23)	14 (−10)	25 (−4)	35 (2)	38 (3)	37 (3)	23 (−5)	16 (−9)	0 (−18)	−11 (−24)	−18 (−28)
Average precipitation inches (mm)	3.76 (96)	3.18 (81)	4.43 (113)	4.36 (111)	4.57 (116)	4.74 (120)	4.99 (127)	4.55 (116)	4.66 (118)	4.89 (124)	4.54 (115)	4.16 (106)	52.83 (1,343)
Average snowfall inches (cm)	14.9 (38)	13.1 (33)	9.7 (25)	1.6 (4.1)	0 (0)	0 (0)	0 (0)	0 (0)	0 (0)	0 (0)	1.2 (3.0)	9.7 (25)	50.2 (128.1)
Average precipitation days (≥ 0.01 inch)	11.5	10.0	11.8	11.5	12.2	12.0	10.4	9.4	9.3	9.2	10.0	11.6	128.9
Average snowy days (≥ 0.1 inch)	7.9	5.4	4.2	.9	0	0	0	0	0	.1	1.0	5.0	24.5
Source: NOAA (1981–2010 normals)

Climate data for Stroudsburg, Pennsylvania
Month	Jan	Feb	Mar	Apr	May	Jun	Jul	Aug	Sep	Oct	Nov	Dec	Year
Record high °F (°C)	72 (22)	74 (23)	87 (31)	96 (36)	97 (36)	110 (43)	104 (40)	103 (39)	106 (41)	95 (35)	98 (37)	72 (22)	110 (43)
Mean daily maximum °F (°C)	35 (2)	39 (4)	49 (9)	61 (16)	72 (22)	80 (27)	85 (29)	83 (28)	75 (24)	64 (18)	51 (11)	40 (4)	61 (16)
Mean daily minimum °F (°C)	16 (−9)	17 (−8)	26 (−3)	36 (2)	46 (8)	55 (13)	59 (15)	58 (14)	50 (10)	38 (3)	30 (−1)	22 (−6)	38 (3)
Record low °F (°C)	−25 (−32)	−21 (−29)	−14 (−26)	10 (−12)	24 (−4)	32 (0)	36 (2)	32 (0)	20 (−7)	14 (−10)	2 (−17)	−14 (−26)	−25 (−32)
Average precipitation inches (mm)	3.98 (101)	3.01 (76)	3.84 (98)	4.00 (102)	5.01 (127)	4.56 (116)	4.42 (112)	4.28 (109)	4.89 (124)	3.81 (97)	4.26 (108)	3.92 (100)	49.98 (1,270)
Source: Weatherbase

== Subregions ==
=== New York City ===
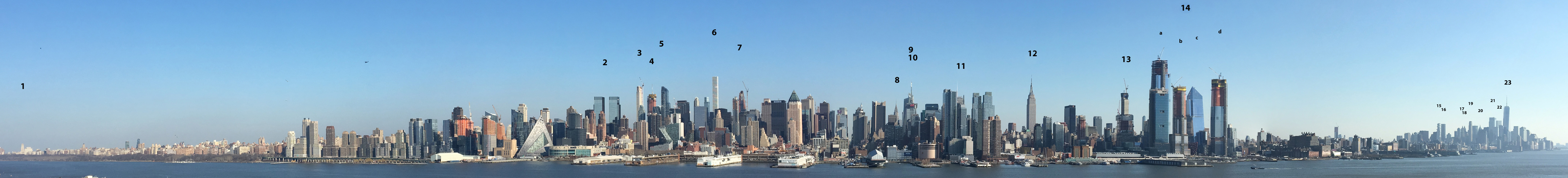
Ten-mile Manhattan skyline panorama (120th St. to the Battery) seen from Weehawken, NJ across the Hudson in February 2018.
1. Riverside Church
2. Deutsche Bank Center
3. 220 Central Park South
4. Central Park Tower
5. One57
6. 432 Park Ave
7. 53W53
8. Chrysler Building
9. Bank of America Tower
10. Conde Nast Building
11. The New York Times Building
12. Empire State Building
13. Manhattan West
14. a: 55 Hudson Yards, b: 35 Hudson Yards, c: 10 Hudson Yards, d: 15 Hudson Yards
15. 56 Leonard St
16. 8 Spruce St
17. Woolworth Building
18. 70 Pine Street
19. 30 Park Pl
20. 40 Wall St
21. 3 World Trade Ctr
22. 4 World Trade Ctr
23. 1 World Trade Ctr

The geographical, cultural, and economic center of the metropolitan area is New York City, the most populous city in the United States and has been described as the capital of the world. The city consists of five boroughs, each of which is coterminous with a county of New York State. The five boroughs – Brooklyn, Queens, Manhattan, the Bronx, and Staten Island – were consolidated into a single city in 1898.

With a Census-estimated population of 8,335,897 in 2022 (8,467,513 in 2021), distributed over a land area of 305 square miles (790 km^{2}), New York is the most densely populated major city in the United States. A global city, New York City exerts a significant impact upon commerce, finance, health care and life sciences, media, dining, art, fashion, research, technology, education, and entertainment.

Home to the headquarters of the United Nations, New York is an important center for international diplomacy. New York is a global city and has been described as the cultural, financial, entertainment, and media capital of the world, as well as the world's most economically powerful city.

=== New York state ===
==== Long Island ====
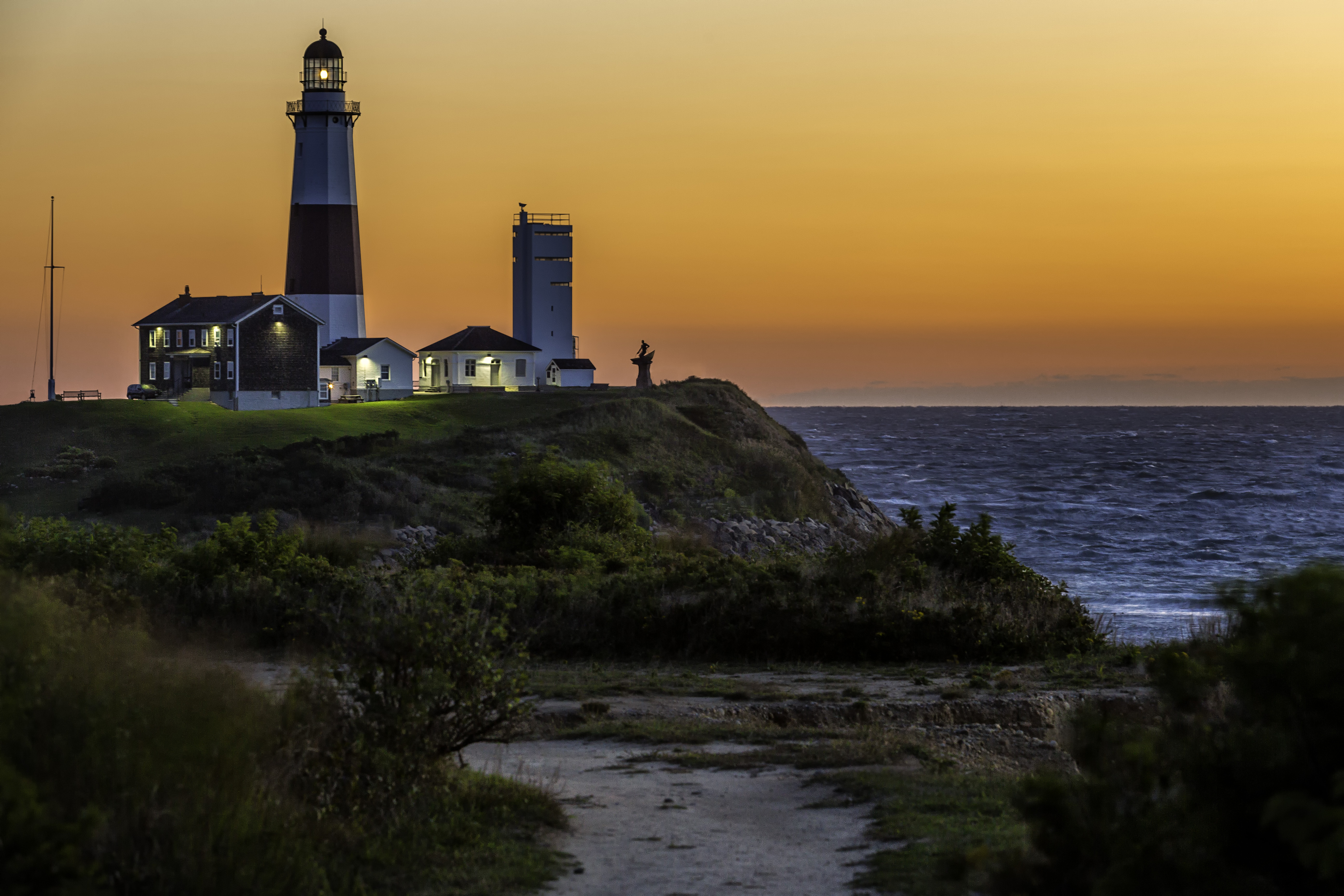
Montauk Point Light is located adjacent to Montauk Point State Park, at the easternmost point of Long Island in Montauk. As the fourth oldest active lighthouse in the United States, it was designated as a National Historic Landmark in 2012 for its significance to New York and international shipping in the early Federal period.

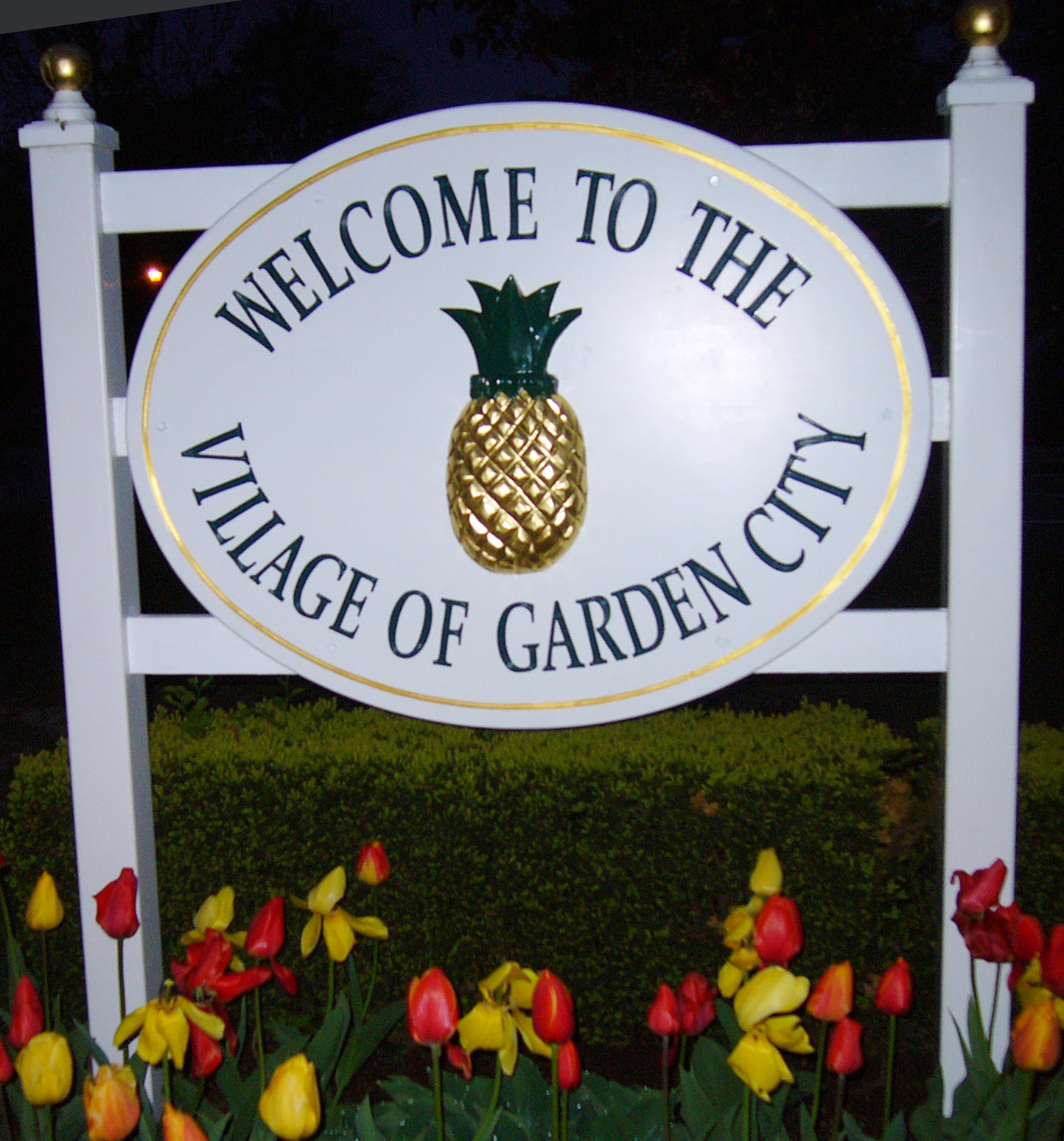
A welcome sign for Garden City in Nassau County

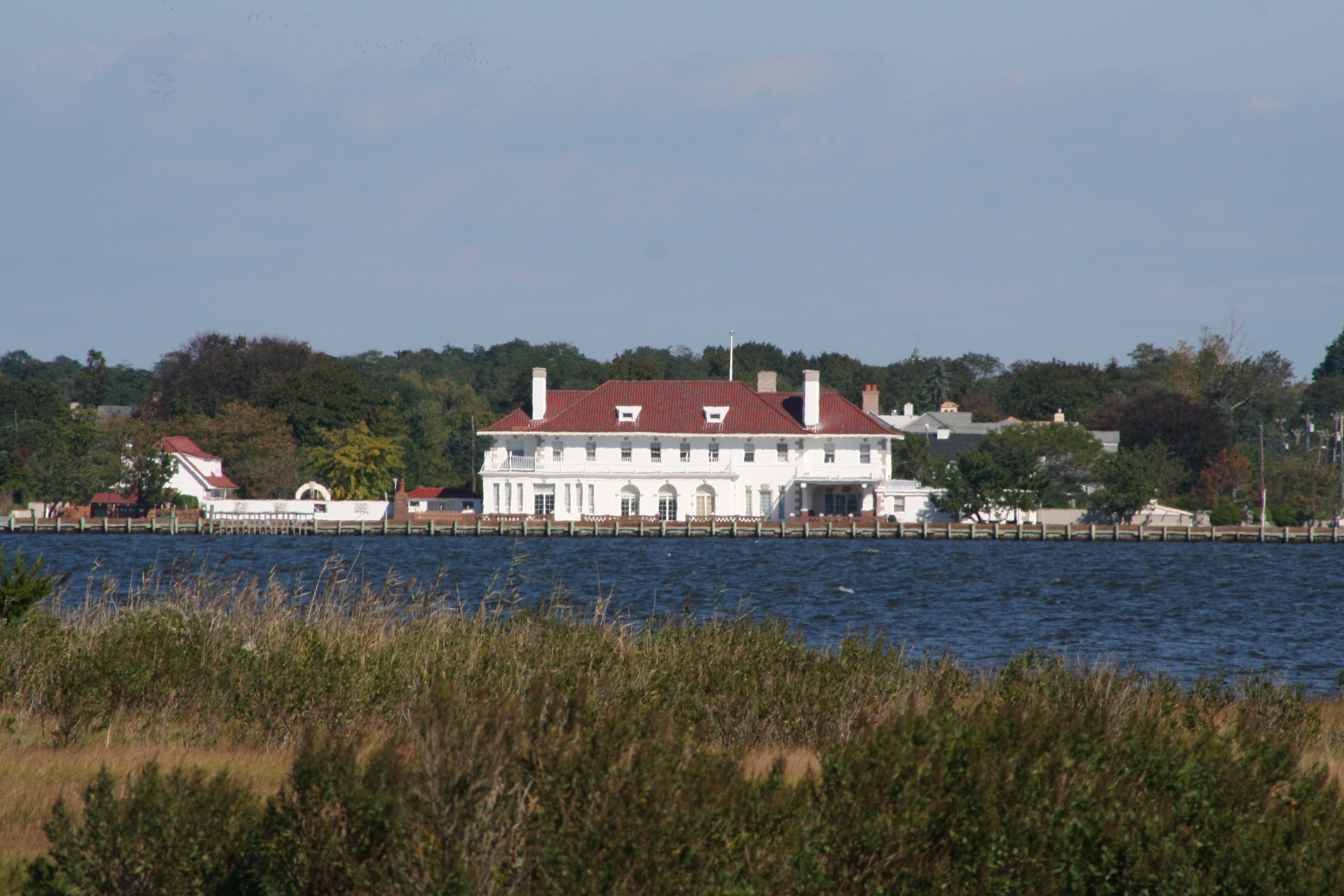
Westhampton, Suffolk County, New York, on the East End of Long Island

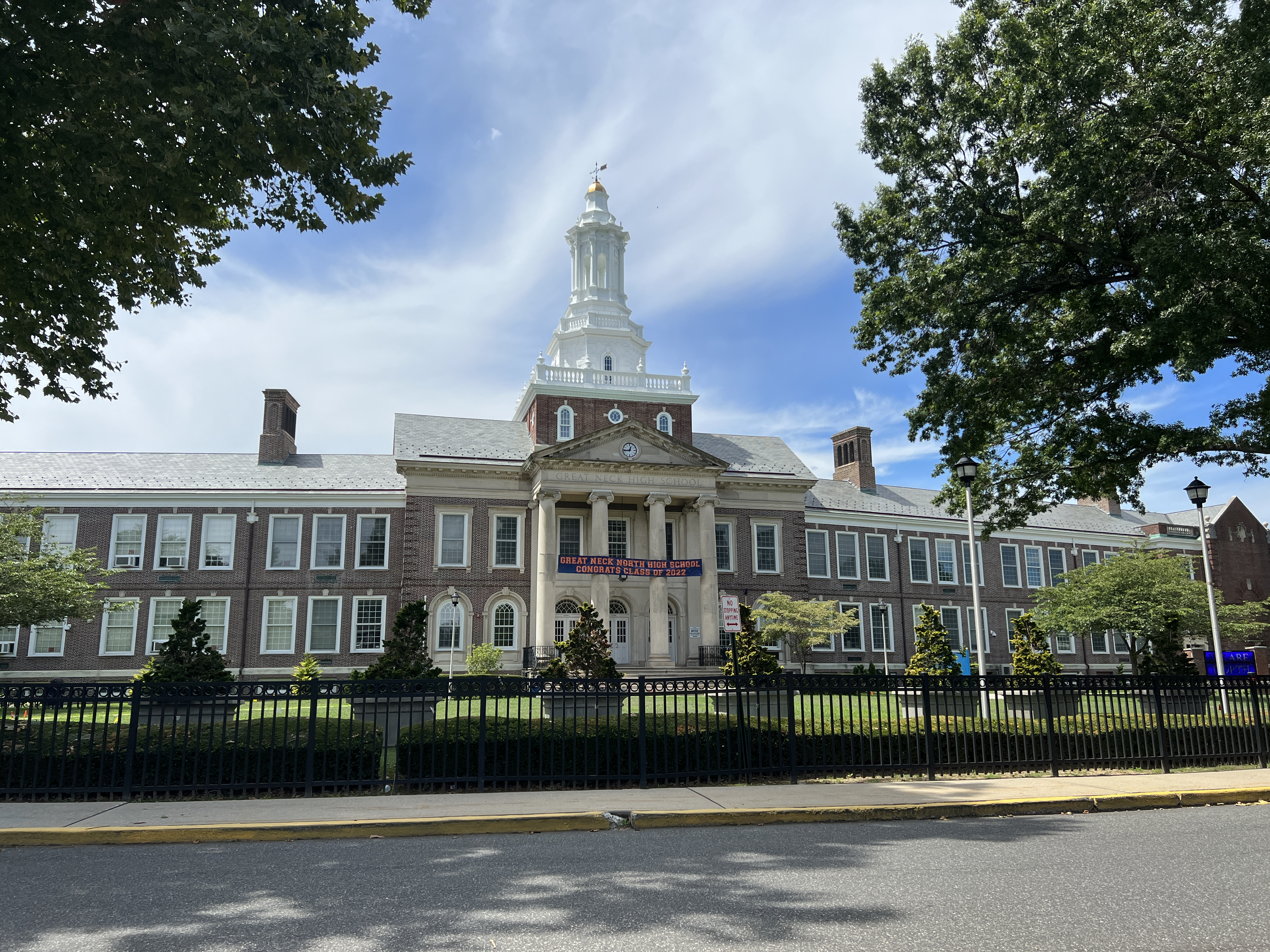
Great Neck North High School in Great Neck, Nassau County

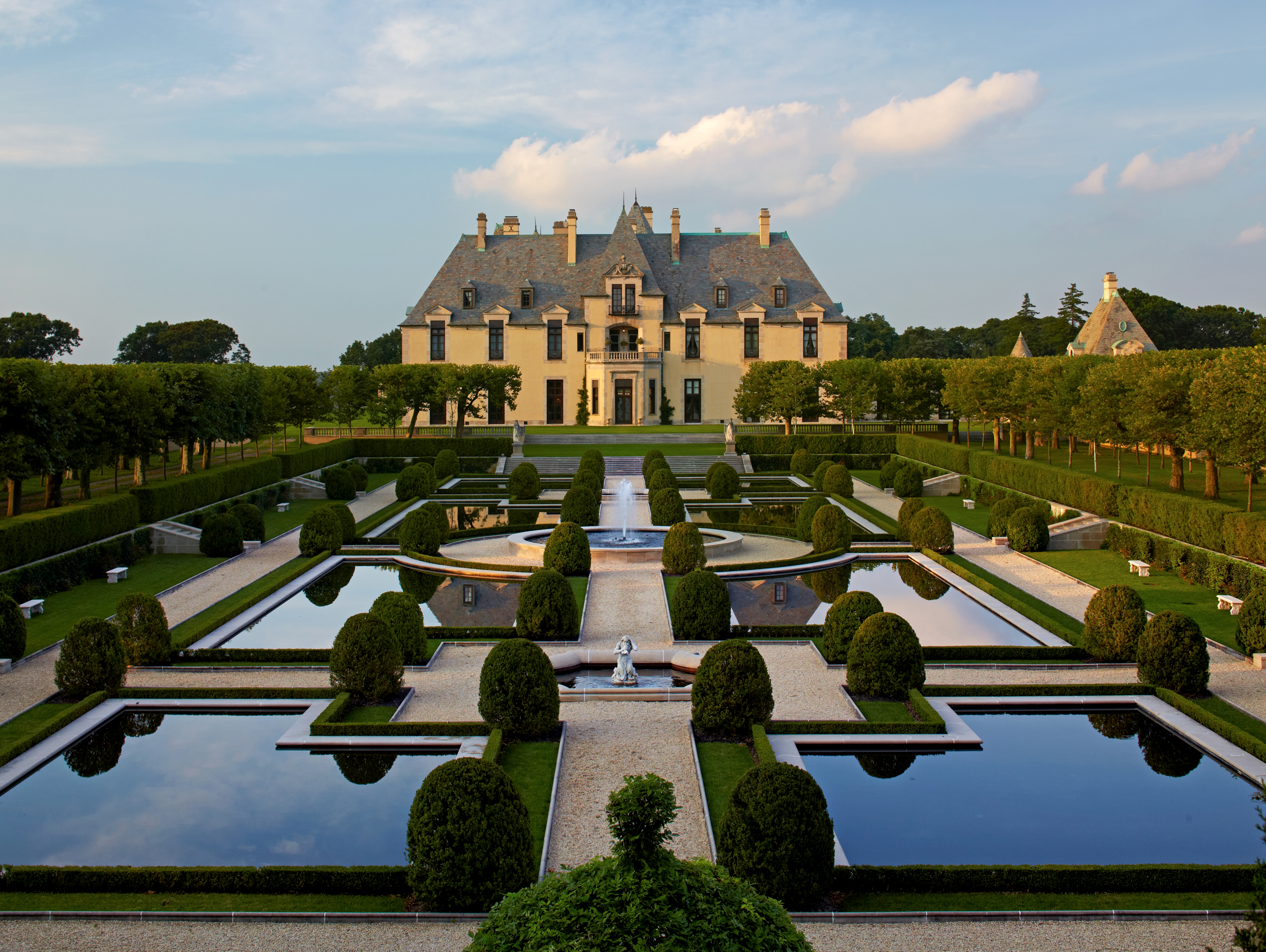
The Otto Kahn Estate on Long Island's historic North Shore. This Gilded Age estate served as partial inspiration for the "Gatsby estate" in F. Scott Fitzgerald's The Great Gatsby.

Long Island, the most populous island in the United States, is located just off the northeast coast of the United States and is a region wholly included within both the U.S. state of New York and the New York metropolitan area. Extending 118 miles east-northeast of Roosevelt Island, Manhattan from New York Harbor into the Atlantic Ocean, the island comprises four counties: Kings and Queens (these form the New York boroughs of Brooklyn and Queens, respectively) to the west; then Nassau and Suffolk to the east. However, most people in the New York metropolitan area (even those living in Queens and Brooklyn) colloquially use the term "Long Island" (or "The Island") exclusively to refer to Nassau County and Suffolk County collectively, which are mainly suburban in character. North of the island is Long Island Sound, across which are the U.S. states of Connecticut and Rhode Island.

With a population of 8,063,232 enumerated at the 2020 U.S. Census, constituting nearly 40% of New York State's population, the majority of New York City residents, 58.4% as of 2020, live on Long Island, namely the estimated 4,896,398 residents living in the New York City boroughs of Brooklyn and Queens. Long Island is the most populated island in any U.S. state or territory, and the 17th-most populous island in the world (ahead of Ireland, Jamaica, and Hokkaidō). Its population density is 5,571 inhabitants per square mile (2,151/km^{2}). If Long Island geographically constituted an independent metropolitan statistical area, it would rank fourth most populous in the United States; while if it were a U.S. state, Long Island would rank 13th in population and first in population density. Queens is the most ethnically diverse urban area in the world. The Town of Hempstead in Nassau County, with an estimated population of 770,367 in 2016, is the most populous municipality in the New York metropolitan area outside of New York City.

Long Island is also the 17th most populous island in the world, but is more prominently known for recreation, boating, and miles of public beaches, including numerous town, county, and state parks, as well as Fire Island National Seashore and wealthy and expensive coastal residential enclaves. Along the north shore, the Gold Coast of Long Island, featured in the film The Great Gatsby, is an upscale section of Nassau and western Suffolk counties that once featured many lavish mansions built and inhabited by wealthy business tycoons in the earlier years of the 20th century, of which only a few remain preserved as historic sites. The East End of Long Island (known as the "Twin Forks" because of its physical shape) boasts open spaces for farmland and wineries. The South Fork, in particular, comprises numerous towns and villages known collectively as "The Hamptons" and has an international reputation as a "playground for the rich and famous", with some of the wealthiest communities in the United States. In 2015, according to Business Insider, the 11962 zip code encompassing Sagaponack, within Southampton, was listed as the most expensive in the U.S. by real estate-listings site Property Shark, with a median home sale price of $5,125,000.

During the summer season, many celebrities and the wealthy visit or reside in mansions and waterfront homes, while others spend weekends enjoying the beaches, gardens, bars, restaurants, and nightclubs.

Long Island is served by a network of parkways and expressways, with the Long Island Expressway, Northern State Parkway, and Southern State Parkway being major east–west routes across significant portions of the island. Commuter rail access is provided by the Metropolitan Transportation Authority (MTA) Long Island Rail Road, one of the largest commuter railroads in the United States. Air travel needs are served by several airports. Within Queens, the island is home to John F. Kennedy International Airport and LaGuardia Airport, two of the three major airline hubs serving the New York area (with Newark Liberty International Airport being the third; all three major airports are operated by The Port Authority of New York & New Jersey). Long Island MacArthur Airport (serving commercial airlines) and Farmingdale/Republic Airport (private and commuter flights) are both located in Suffolk County.

==== Hudson Valley ====
===== Lower Hudson Valley =====
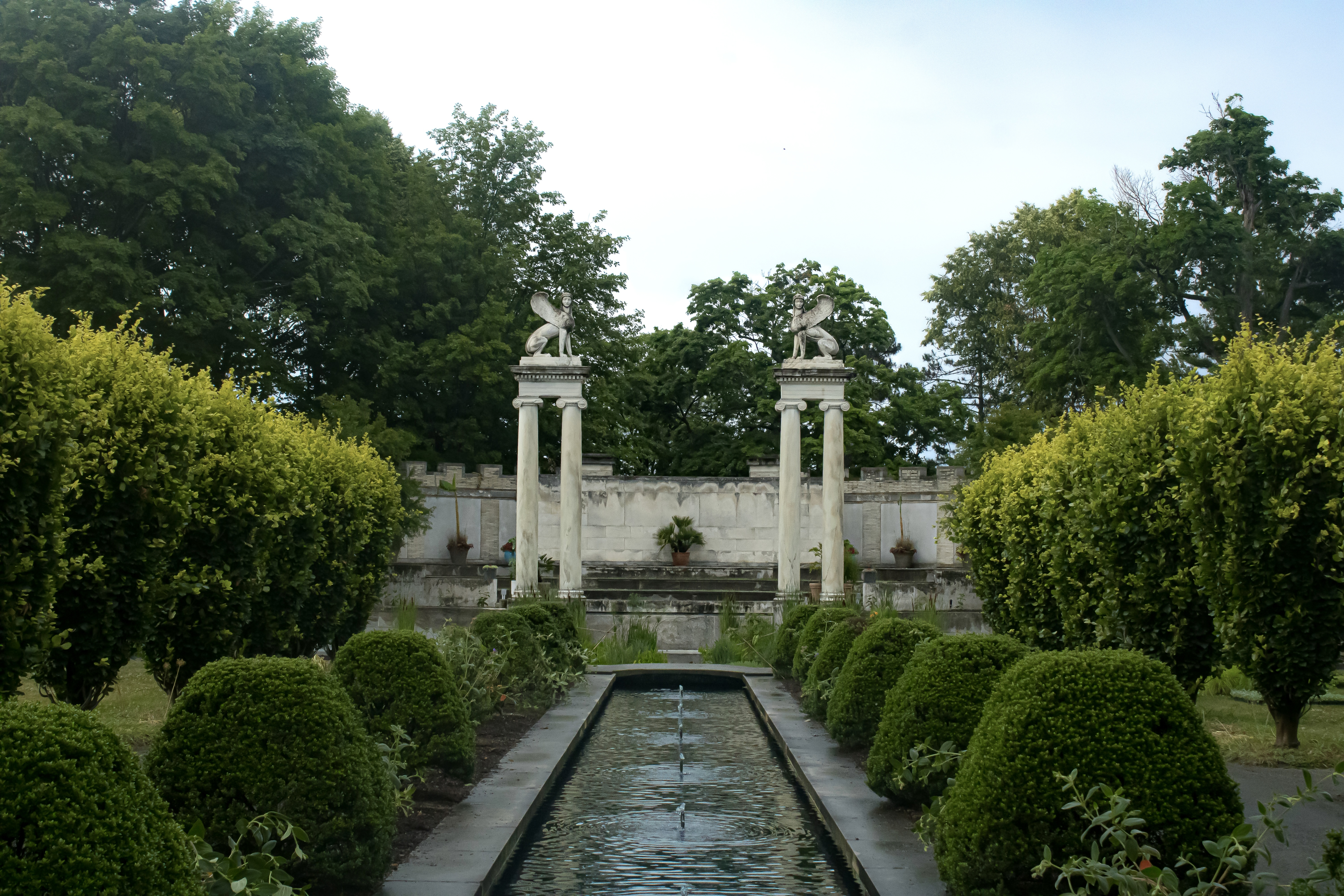
Untermyer Park and Gardens in Westchester County

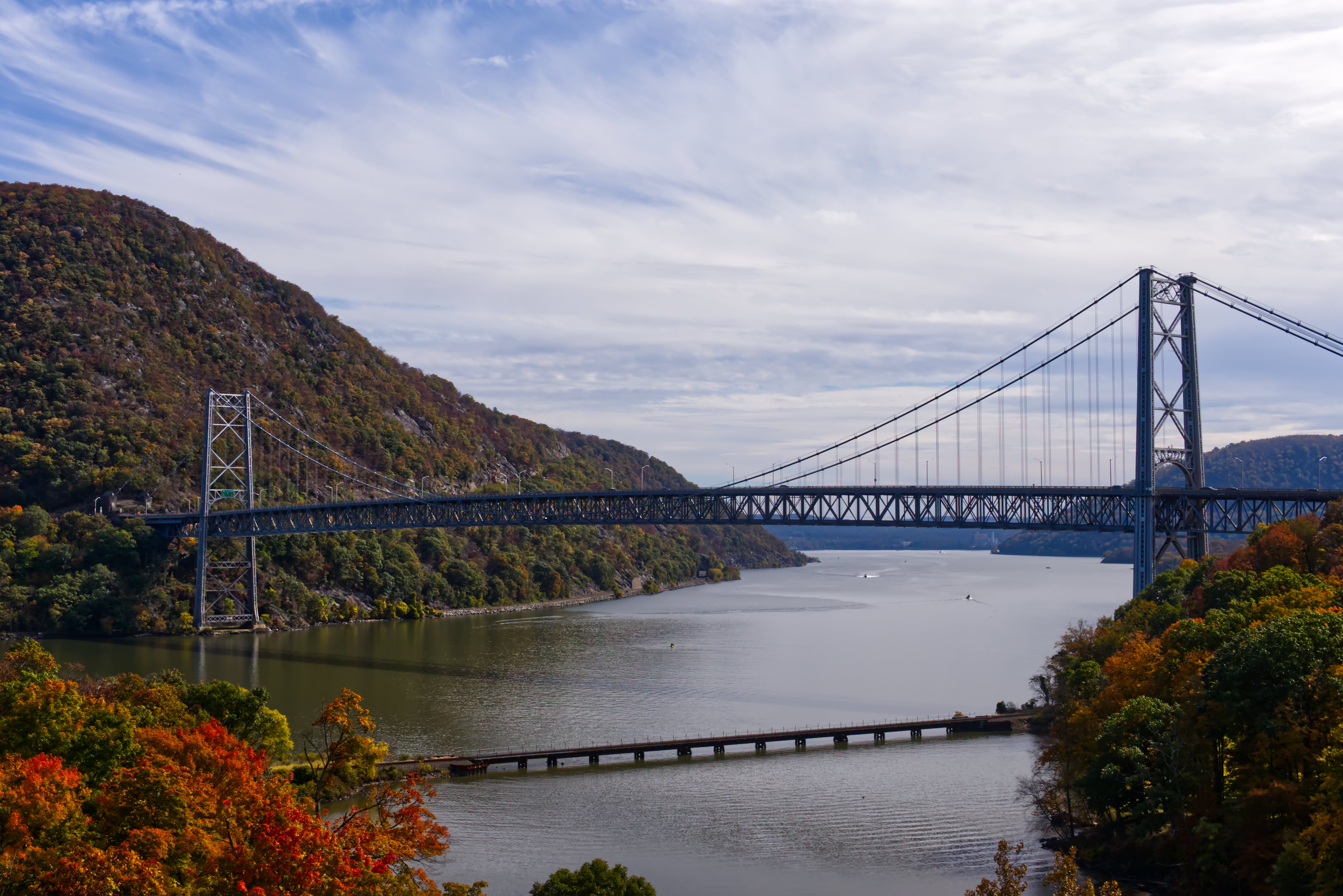
Bear Mountain Bridge, which connects Westchester and Orange counties across the Hudson River

Known for its hilly terrain, picturesque settings, and quaint small towns and villages, the Lower Hudson Valley is centered around the Hudson River north of New York City and lies within New York State. Westchester and Putnam counties are located on the eastern side of the river, and Rockland and Orange counties are located on the western side of the river. Westchester and Rockland counties are connected by the heavily trafficked New Tappan Zee Bridge, as well as by the Bear Mountain Bridge near their northern ends. Several branches of the MTA Metro-North Railroad serve the region's rail commuters. Southern Westchester County contains more densely populated areas and includes the cities of Yonkers, Mount Vernon, New Rochelle, and White Plains. Many of the suburban communities of Westchester are known for their affluence and expense (some examples: Bronxville, Scarsdale, Chappaqua, Armonk, Pound Ridge, Katonah, and Briarcliff Manor). Rockland's river towns along the Hudson, including Nyack and Piermont, are known for their vibrant dining and art scenes. 30% of Rockland's land area is designated parkland with impressive scenery, which attracts many visitors from the tri-state area. In recent years, the high cost of housing in the Lower Hudson Valley, plus increased remote working opportunities, has caused some to move further north into the Mid Hudson Valley.

Historically, the valley was home to many factories, including paper mills, but a significant number have closed. After years of lingering pollution, cleanup efforts to improve the Hudson River water quality are currently planned and will be supervised by the United States Environmental Protection Agency (EPA).

===== Mid-Hudson Valley =====
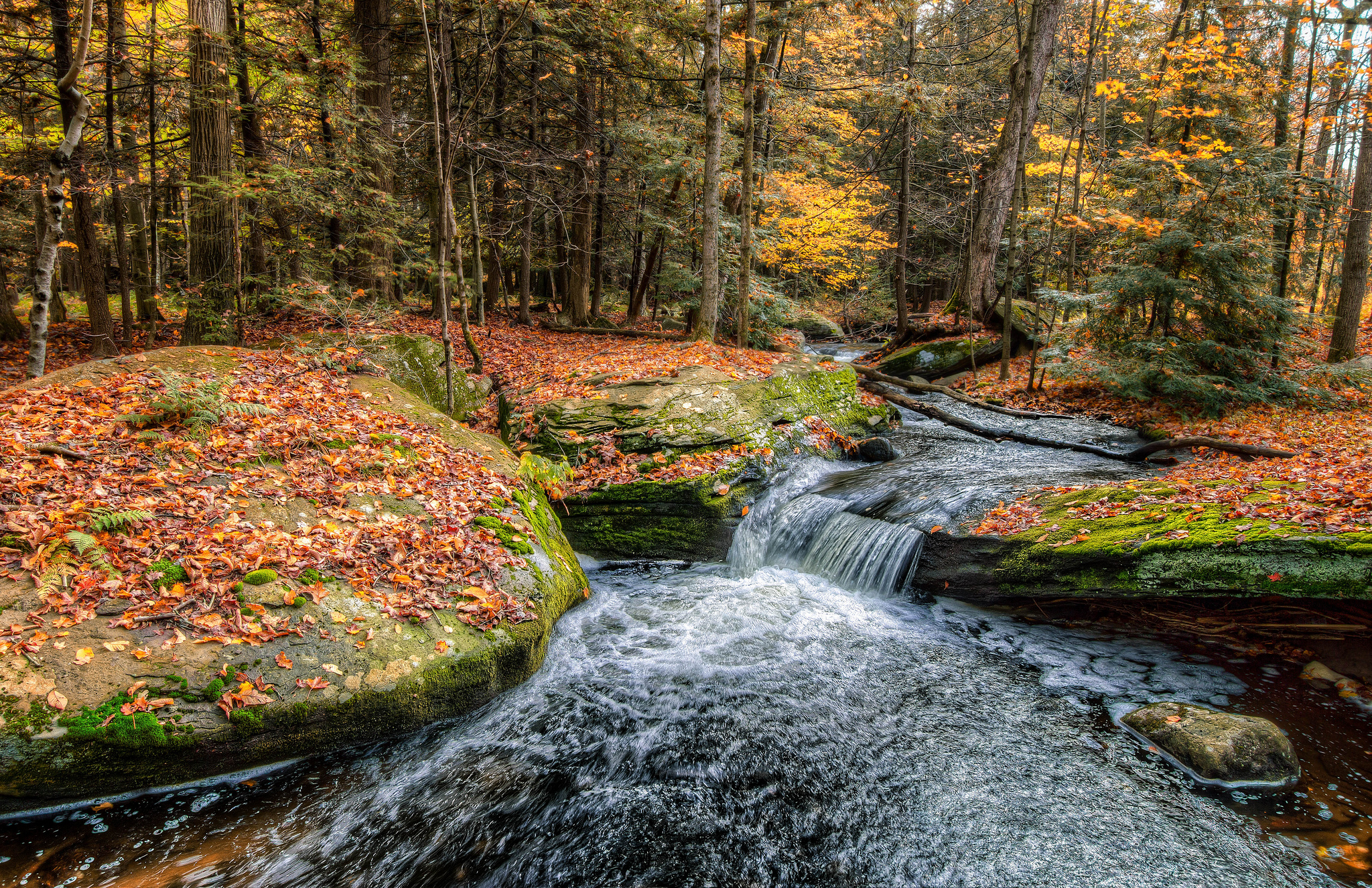
Rock Hill in Sullivan County

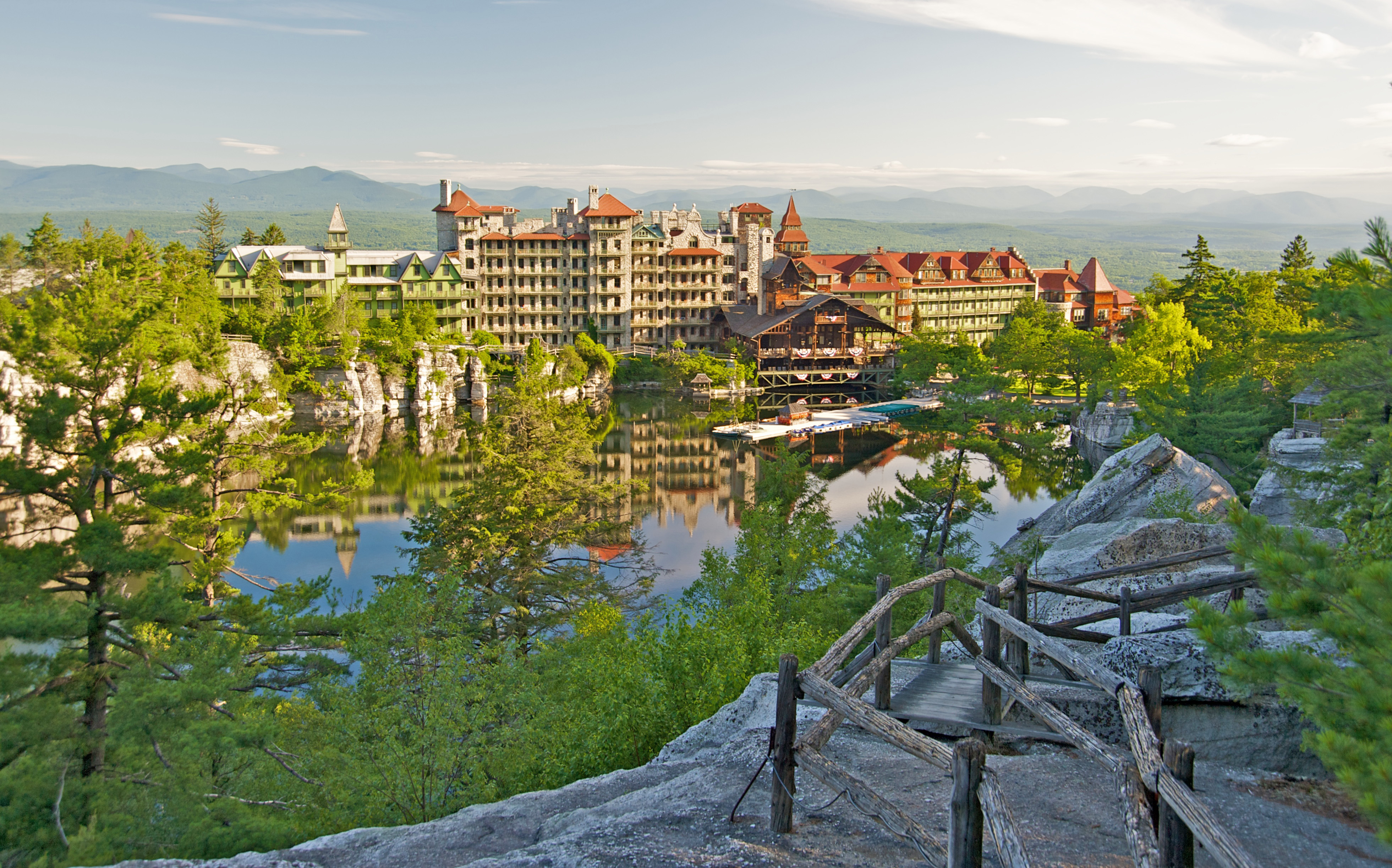
Mohonk Mountain House in Ulster County was designated as a National Historic Landmark in 1986.

The Mid-Hudson Valley region of the State of New York is midway between New York City and the state capital of Albany. The area includes the counties of Dutchess, Ulster, and Sullivan, as well as the northern portions of Orange County, with the region's main cities being Poughkeepsie, Newburgh, Kingston, and Beacon. The Walkway over the Hudson, is the second longest pedestrian footbridge in the world. It crosses the Hudson River connecting Poughkeepsie and Highland. The 13 mile-long Dutchess Rail Trail stretches from Hopewell Junction to the beginning of the Walkway over the Hudson in Poughkeepsie. The area is home to the Wappingers Central School District, which the second-largest school district in the state of New York. The Newburgh Waterfront in the City of Newburgh is home to many high-end restaurants.

U.S. Route 9, I-84, and the Taconic State Parkway all run through Dutchess County. Metro-North Railroad train station, New Hamburg, is located in the Town of Poughkeepsie and runs from Poughkeepsie to Grand Central Terminal in New York City.

=== New Jersey ===
==== Northern New Jersey ====
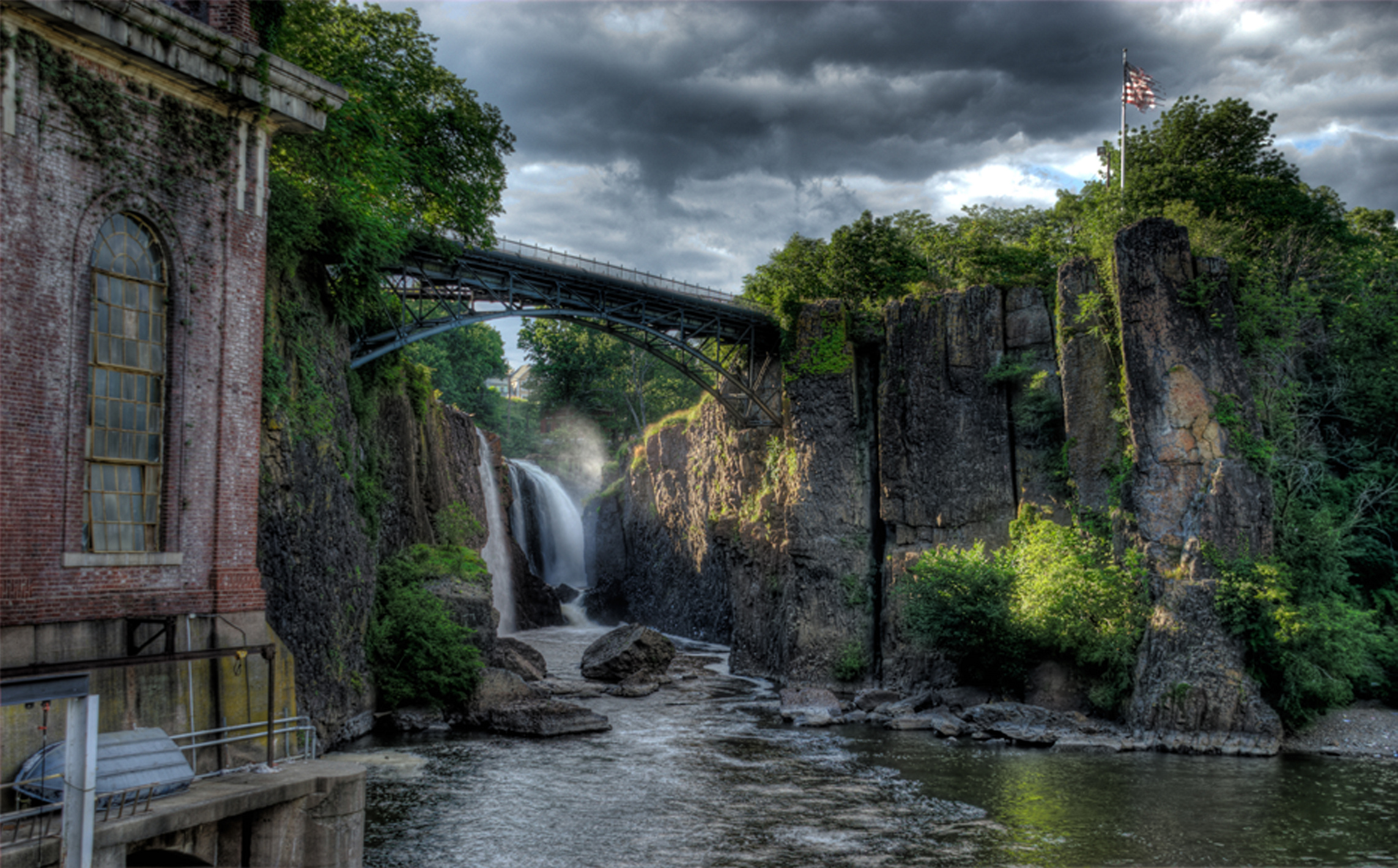
The Great Falls of the Passaic River in Paterson, which was dedicated as a National Historical Park in November 2011, incorporates one of the largest waterfalls on the U.S. East Coast.

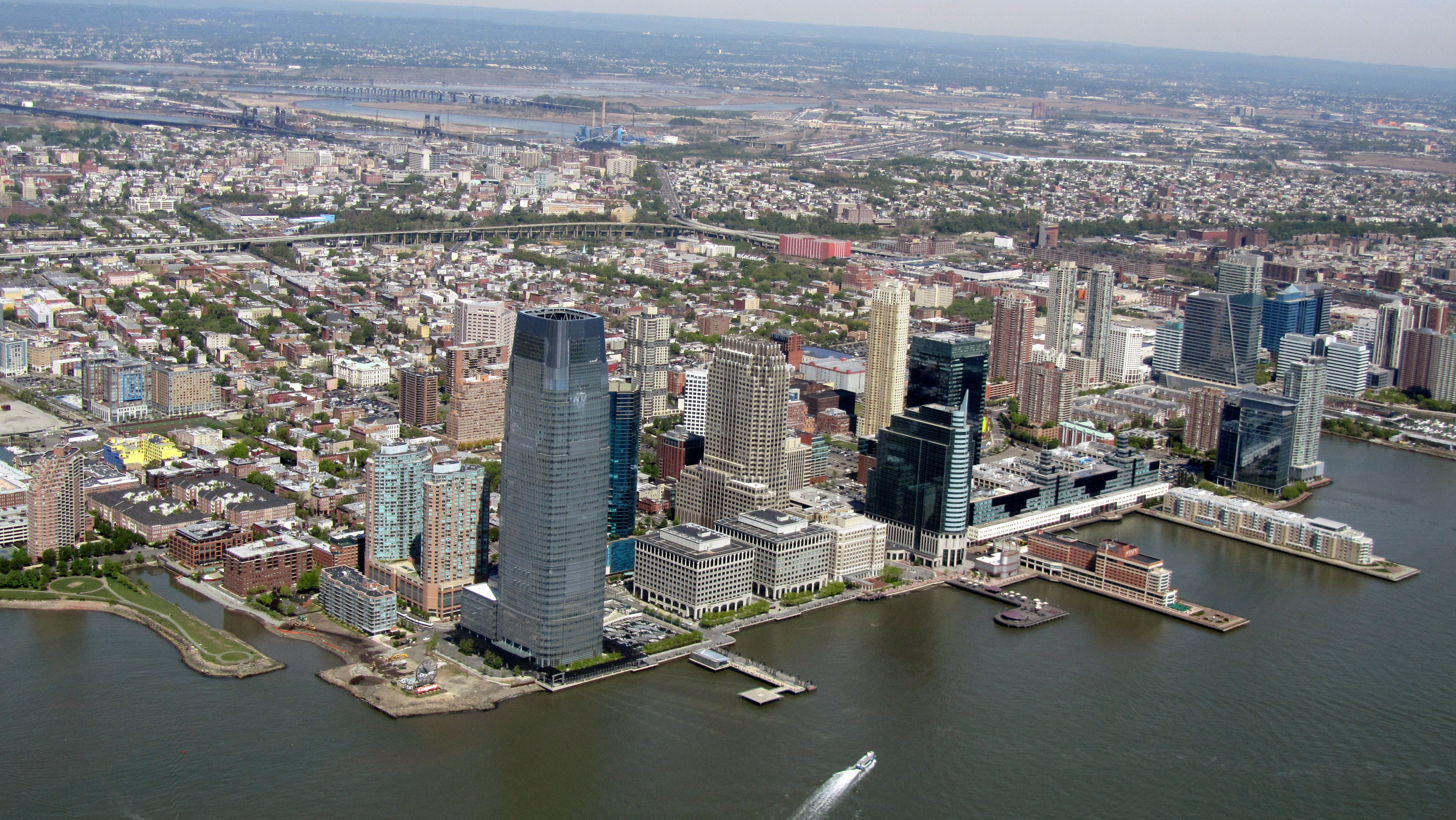
Jersey City, the second-most populous city in New Jersey, after Newark. It is the county seat of Hudson County, located directly across the Hudson River from Lower Manhattan.

Northern New Jersey, also known colloquially as North Jersey, is typically defined as comprising the following counties:

- Bergen County
- Essex County
- Somerset County (anything north of Bridgewater Township)
- Hudson County
- Hunterdon County (anything north of Readington Township)
- Morris County
- Passaic County
- Sussex County
- Union County (anything north of Scotch Plains Township, Clark Township, and Linden)
- Warren County

The New Jersey State Department of Tourism splits North Jersey into the urban Gateway Region and the more rural Skylands Region. Northern New Jersey is home to four of the largest cities of that state: Newark, Jersey City, Paterson, and Elizabeth.

The region is geographically diverse with wetlands, mountains, and valleys throughout the area. It has a large network of expressways and public transportation rail services, mostly operated by New Jersey Transit. Northern New Jersey also contains the second busiest airport in the New York metropolitan area, Newark Liberty International Airport.

Although it is a suburban and rural region of New York, much of the Gateway Region is highly urbanized. The entirety of Hudson County, eastern Essex County, southern Passaic County as well as Elizabeth in Union County are all densely populated areas.

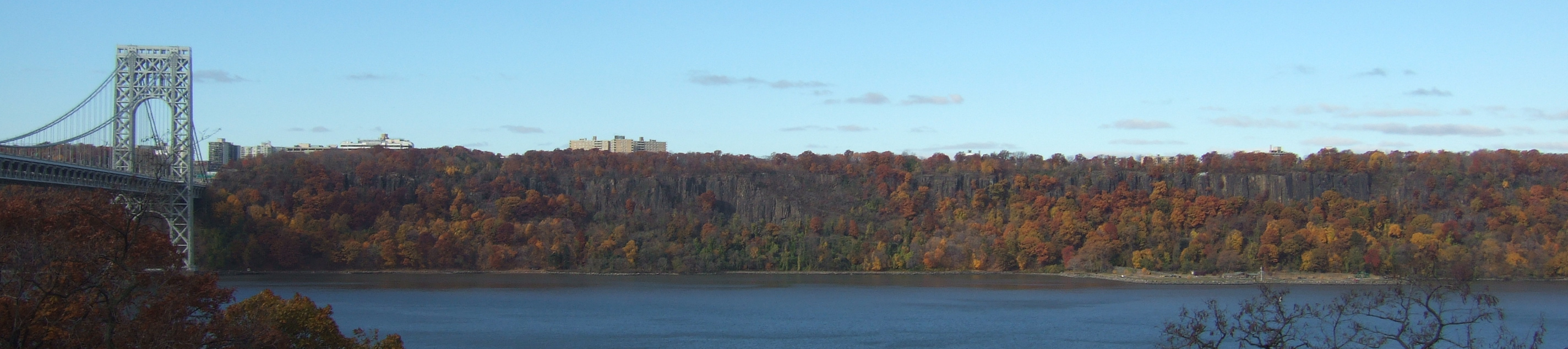
Pictured The Palisades, with the George Washington Bridge on the left. The Palisades are a line of steep cliffs along the west side of the Hudson River in Northeastern New Jersey and Southeastern New York, stretching north from Jersey City, New Jersey to Nyack, New York.

==== Central New Jersey ====
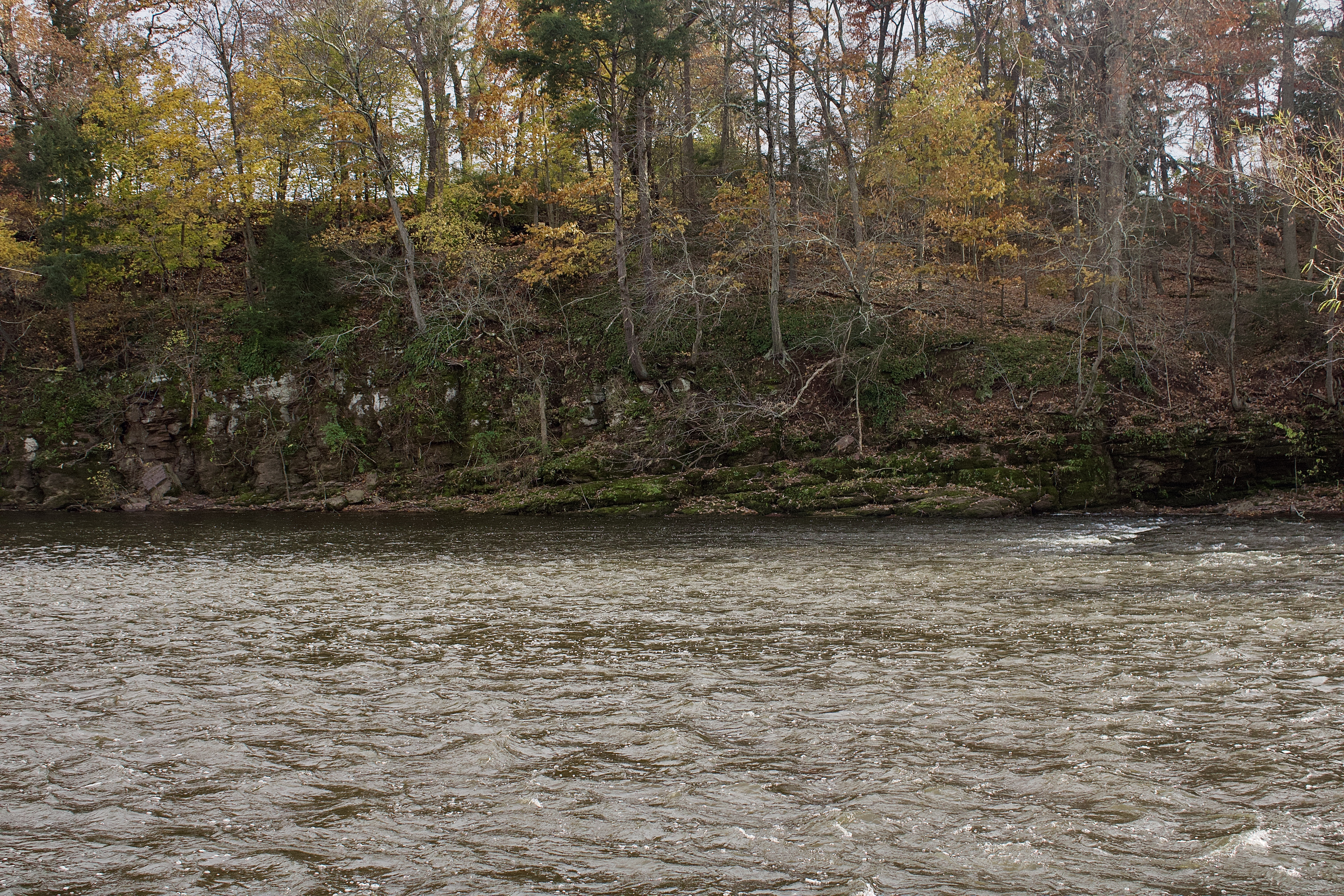
The Raritan River as seen from Bridgewater in Somerset County

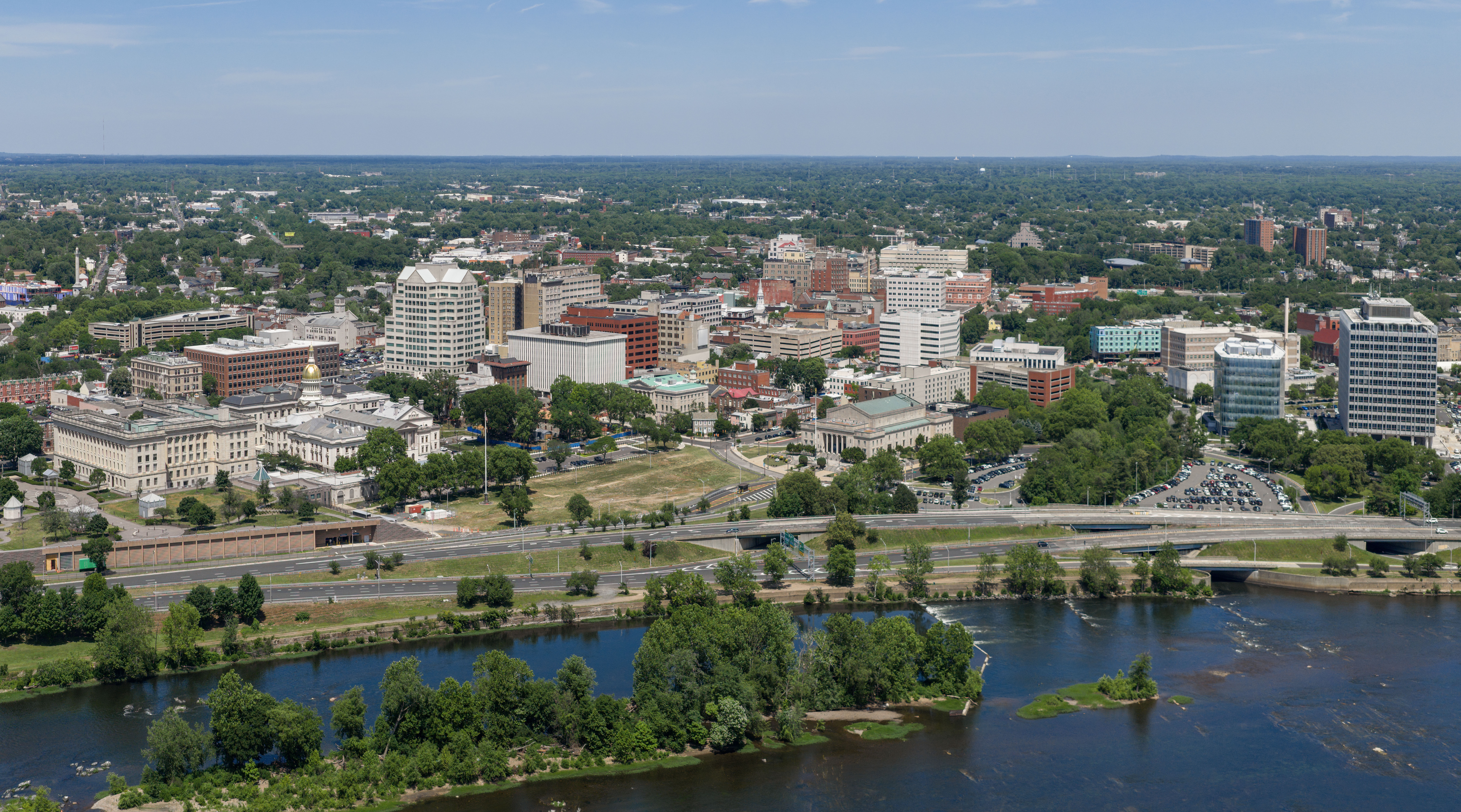
Downtown Trenton in Mercer County, located alongside the Delaware River. It is the only U.S. state capital located in the metropolitan area.

Central Jersey is the middle portion of New Jersey. It generally comprises the following counties:

- Middlesex County
- Mercer County
- Monmouth County
- Ocean County (anything north of Toms River)
- Union County (anything south of Scotch Plains Township, Clark Township, and Linden)
- Hunterdon County (anything south of Readington Township)
- Somerset County (anything south of Bridgewater Township)

Notable municipalities in the region include Trenton (the state capital of New Jersey and the only U.S. state capital within the New York metropolitan area), Princeton (home to the Ivy League Princeton University), New Brunswick (home to Rutgers University's main New Brunswick campus, the largest university campus in New Jersey), Lakewood (home to Beth Medrash Govoha, the largest yeshiva outside of Israel), and Edison (home to Thomas Edison's original research laboratory, located in what is now Edison State Park in Menlo Park, where inventions such as the phonograph, the motion-picture camera, and the incandescent light bulb were developed). The region also encompasses a significant portion of the Jersey Shore, including the cities of Red Bank, Long Branch, and Asbury Park. Major transportation links in Central Jersey include the New Jersey Turnpike, the Garden State Parkway, US 1, US 9, and NJ Transit's North Jersey Coast and Northeast Corridor Lines. All of these aforementioned routes bisect each other in the suburban transit and commercial hub of Woodbridge.

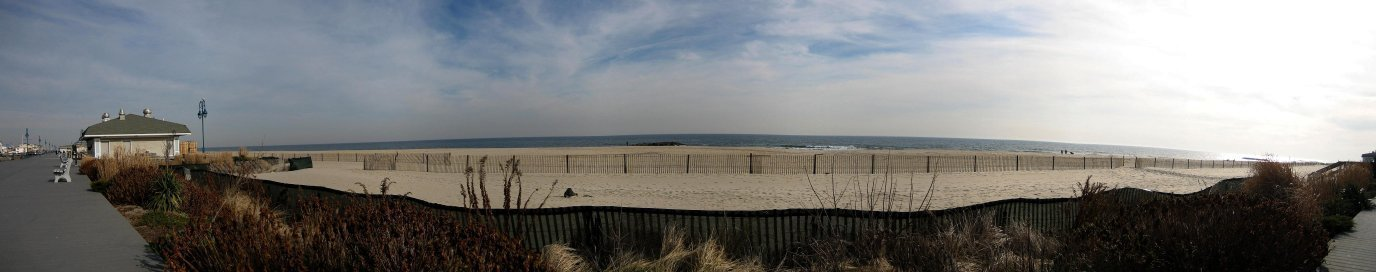
Belmar's beach and boardwalk in Monmouth County, on the Jersey Shore

=== Connecticut ===
==== Western Connecticut ====
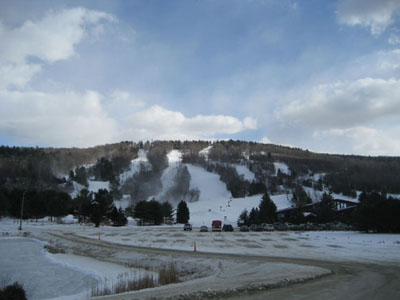
Mohawk Mountain Ski Area in Cornwall, in the Berkshire Mountains

Fairfield, New Haven, and Litchfield counties in western Connecticut (like the state in general) are known for affluence. Large businesses are scattered throughout the area, mostly in Fairfield County. The land is flat along the coast with low hills eventually giving way to larger hills such as The Berkshires further inland, to the Massachusetts border. Most of the largest cities in the state are in New Haven County (home to Yale University) and Fairfield County.

Candlewood Lake is the largest recreational lake in the New York metropolitan area. The lake is located within the Greater Danbury region, and is home to many second homes of New York City residents.

=== Pennsylvania ===
==== Pike County, Pennsylvania ====
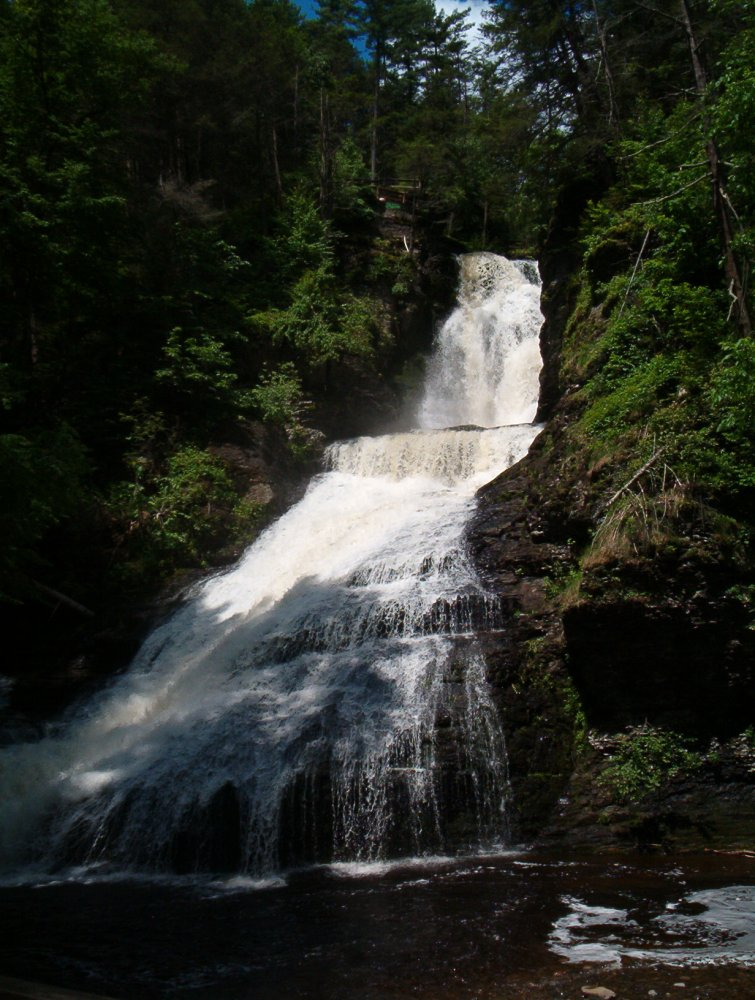
Dingmans Falls in the Delaware Water Gap National Recreation Area in Pike County, Pennsylvania in Northeastern Pennsylvania

Pike County, Pennsylvania is located in Northeastern Pennsylvania. As of the 2010 Census, the population was 57,369. Its county seat is Milford. Part of the Pocono Mountains region lies within Pike County, which has ranked among the fastest-growing counties of Pennsylvania.

This county was detached from the New York-Newark-Jersey City MSA in September 2023 and now forms the Hemlock Farms, PA μSA.

== Communities ==
=== Main cities and towns ===
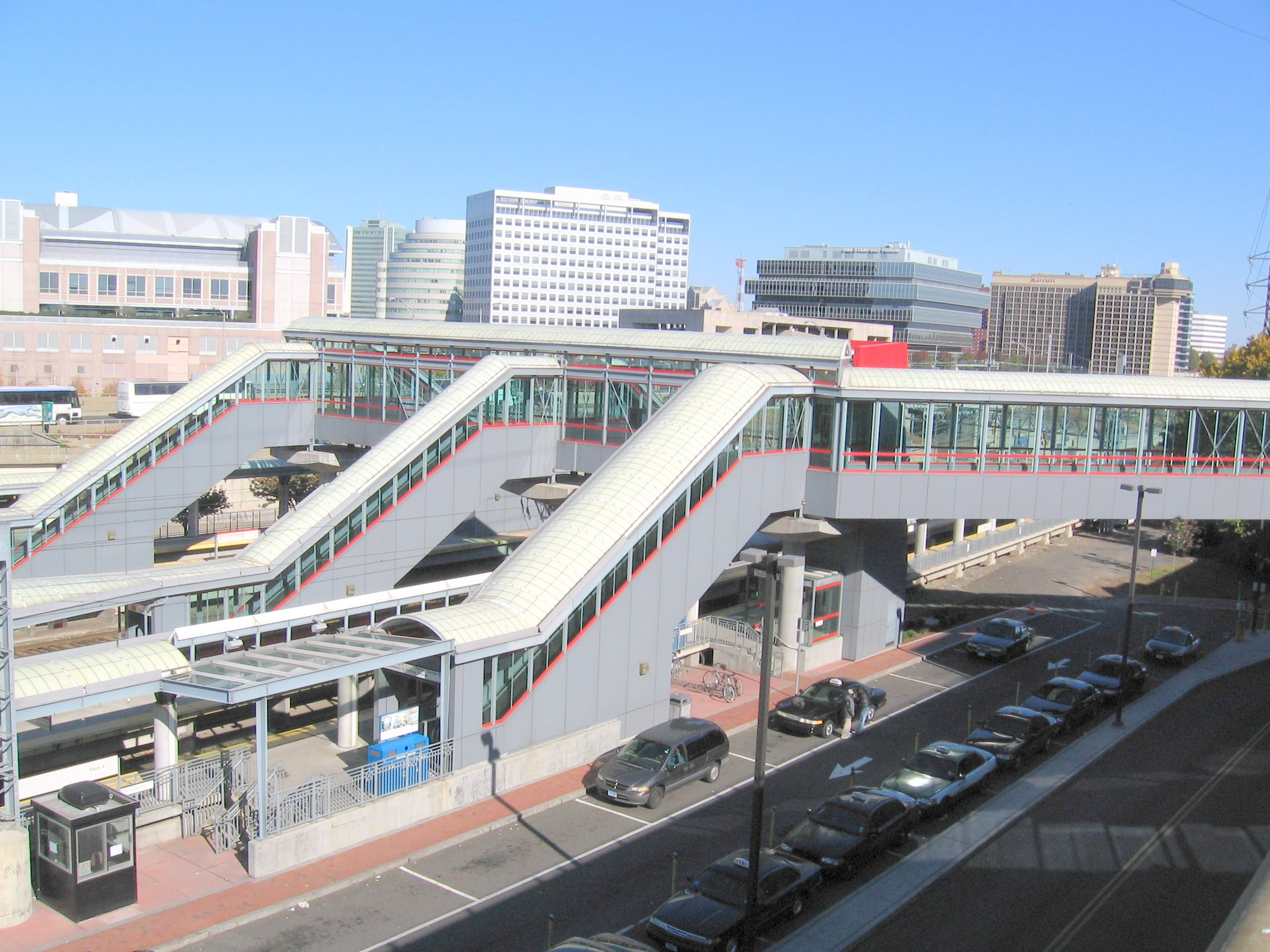
Downtown Stamford in Fairfield County, Connecticut

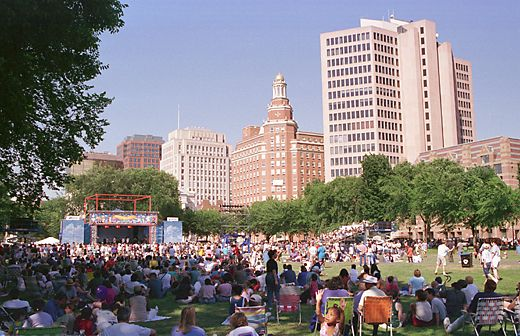
The New Haven Green Historic District in Connecticut, which was designated a National Historic Landmark District in 1970

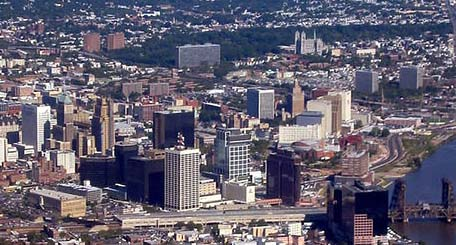
An aerial view of Newark, the most populous city in New Jersey

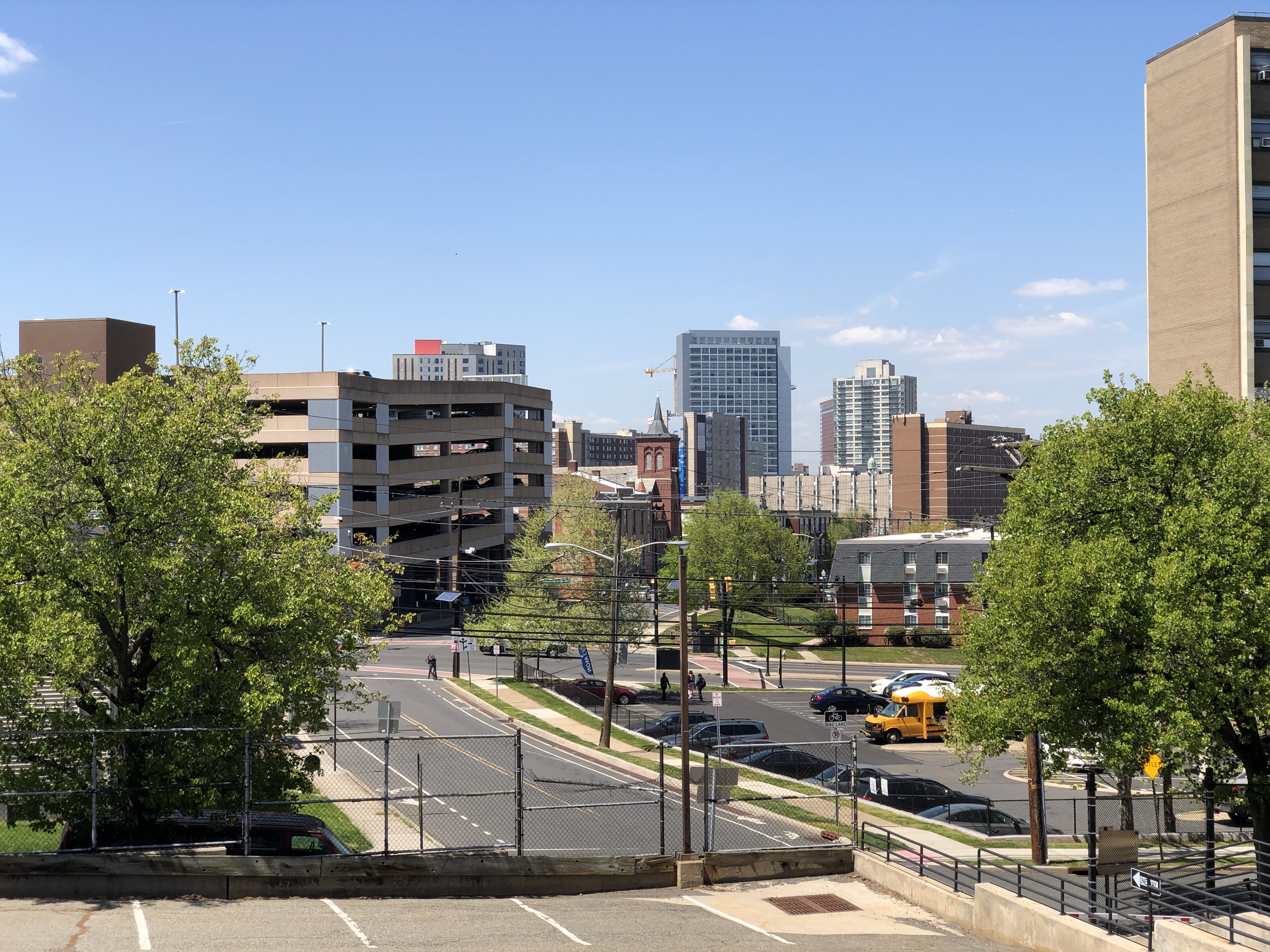
Downtown New Brunswick, an educational and cultural hub of Central Jersey

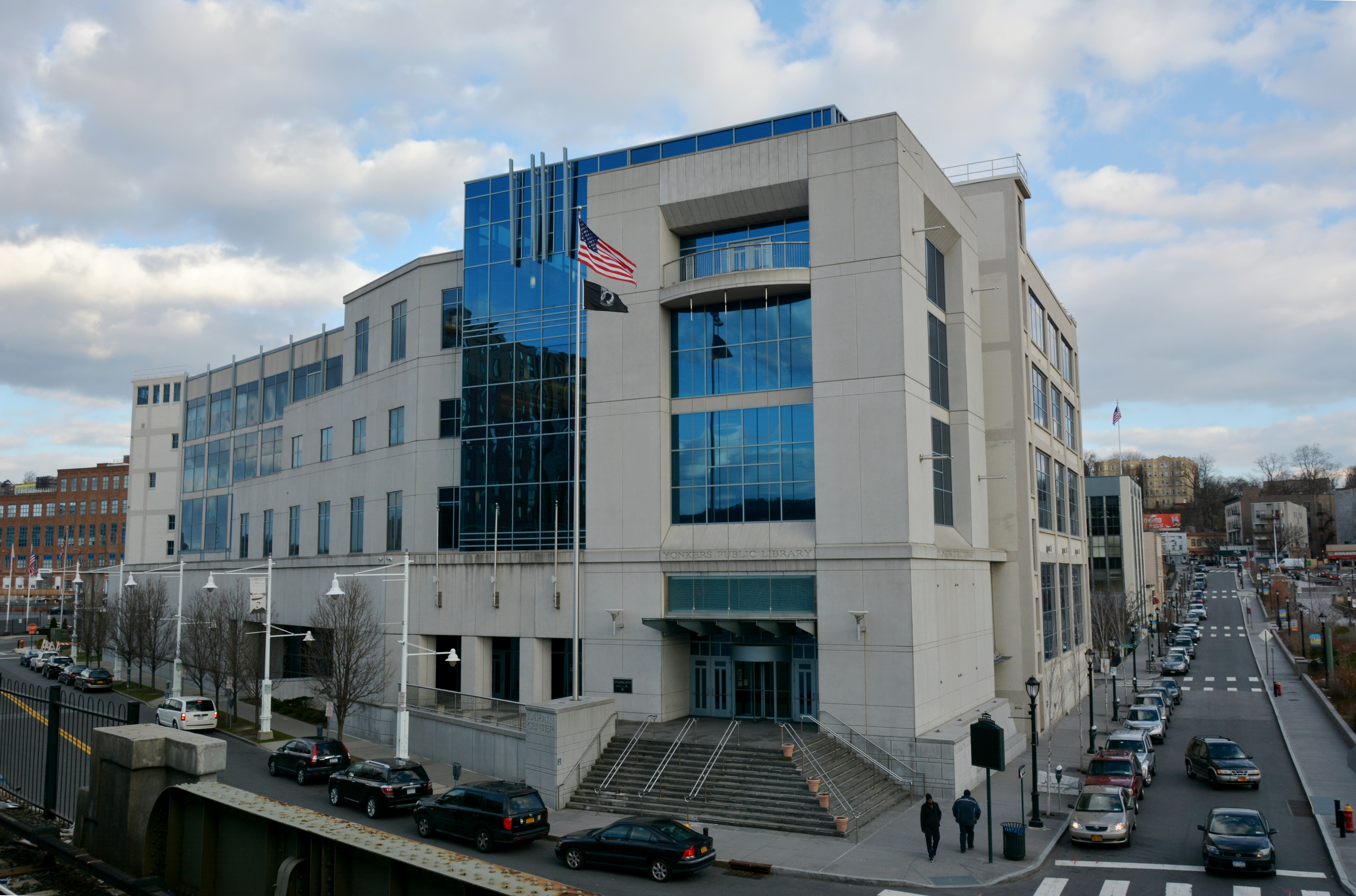
Yonkers Public Library in Yonkers in Westchester County, New York

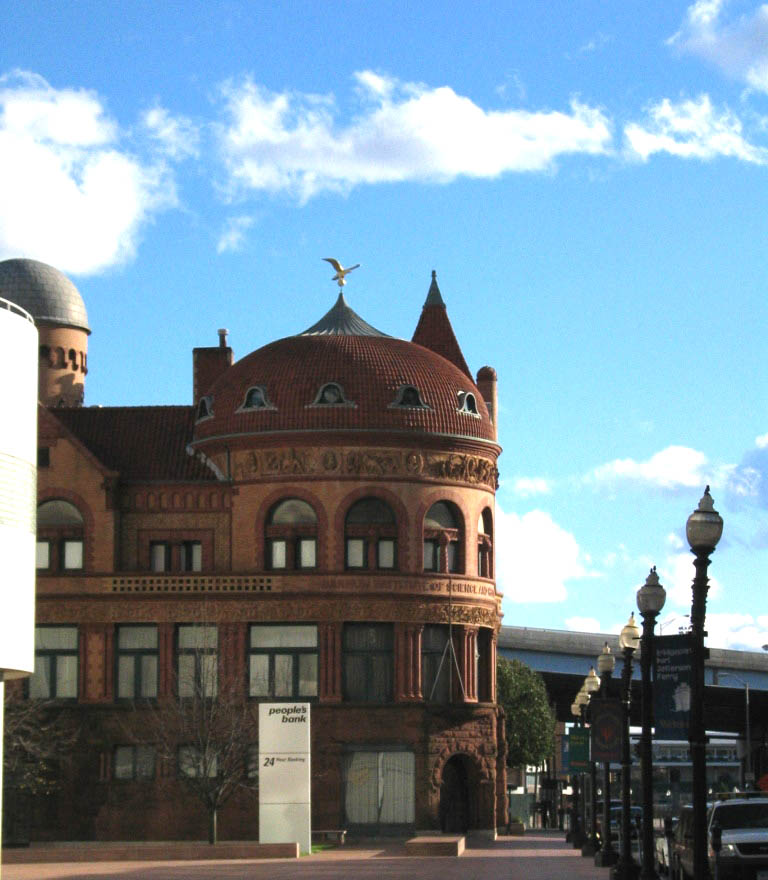
Barnum Museum in Bridgeport, Connecticut, the most populous city in Fairfield County

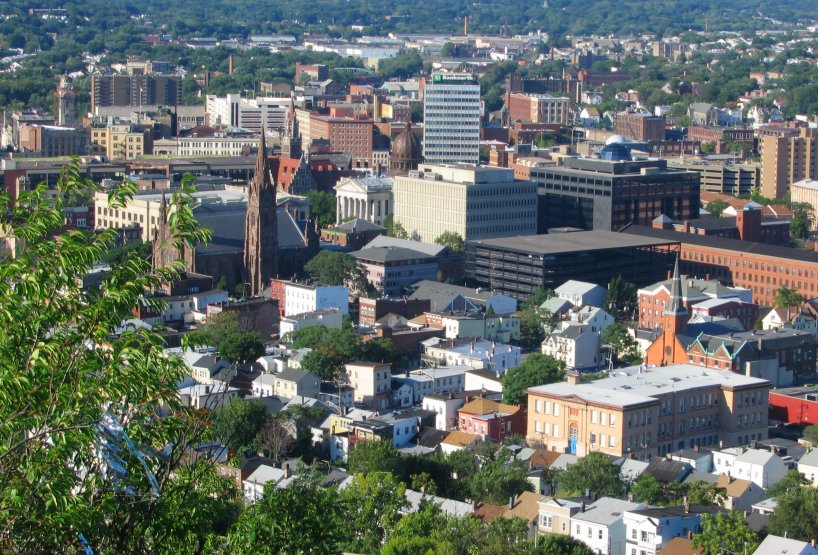
Paterson, Passaic County, New Jersey, known as the "Silk City", seen here from Garret Mountain Reservation, is a prime destination for a diverse pool of international immigrants.

The following is a list of "principal cities" and their respective population estimates from the 2020 U.S. Census. Principal cities include those with populations over 100,000 or major job, cultural, educational, and economic centers. (Note: Many of the places on this list are towns in New York, but oftentimes only specific villages or hamlets within the towns are significant.)

New York-Newark-Jersey City MSA
City	State	2020 census	Land area	2020 population density
New York City	New York	8,804,190	301.5 sq mi (781 km^{2})	29,303/sq mi (11,314/km^{2})
Hempstead	New York	793,409	191.7 sq mi (497 km^{2})	6,685/sq mi (2,581/km^{2})
Brookhaven	New York	485,773	531.5 sq mi (1,377 km^{2})	1,873/sq mi (723/km^{2})
Islip	New York	339,938	162.9 sq mi (422 km^{2})	3,275/sq mi (1,264/km^{2})
Newark	New Jersey	311,549	24.1 sq mi (62 km^{2})	12,904/sq mi (4,982/km^{2})
Oyster Bay	New York	301,332	169.4 sq mi (439 km^{2})	1,800/sq mi (690/km^{2})
Jersey City	New Jersey	292,449	14.8 sq mi (38 km^{2})	19,835/sq mi (7,658/km^{2})
North Hempstead	New York	237,639	69.1 sq mi (179 km^{2})	4,441/sq mi (1,715/km^{2})
Babylon	New York	218,223	114.2 sq mi (296 km^{2})	4,170/sq mi (1,610/km^{2})
Yonkers	New York	211,569	18 sq mi (47 km^{2})	11,750/sq mi (4,540/km^{2})
Huntington	New York	204,127	137.1 sq mi (355 km^{2})	2,162/sq mi (835/km^{2})
Paterson	New Jersey	159,732	8.4 sq mi (22 km^{2})	18,986/sq mi (7,331/km^{2})
Ramapo	New York	148,919	61.8 sq mi (160 km^{2})	2,400/sq mi (930/km^{2})
Elizabeth	New Jersey	137,298	12.3 sq mi (32 km^{2})	11,145/sq mi (4,303/km^{2})
Lakewood	New Jersey	135,158	24.7 sq mi (64 km^{2})	5,476/sq mi (2,114/km^{2})
Smithtown	New York	116,296	111.4 sq mi (289 km^{2})	1,000/sq mi (390/km^{2})
Edison	New Jersey	107,588	30.1 sq mi (78 km^{2})	3,578/sq mi (1,381/km^{2})
Woodbridge	New Jersey	103,639	23.3 sq mi (60 km^{2})	4,456/sq mi (1,720/km^{2})
Toms River	New Jersey	95,438	40.55 sq mi (105.0 km^{2})	2,353/sq mi (908/km^{2})
Greenburgh	New York	95,397	30.31 sq mi (78.5 km^{2})	3,147/sq mi (1,215/km^{2})
Clifton	New Jersey	90,296	11.28 sq mi (29.2 km^{2})	8,005/sq mi (3,091/km^{2})
Clarkstown	New York	86,855	38.47 sq mi (99.6 km^{2})	2,258/sq mi (872/km^{2})
New Rochelle	New York	79,726	10.29 sq mi (26.7 km^{2})	7,751/sq mi (2,993/km^{2})
Mount Vernon	New York	73,893	4.39 sq mi (11.4 km^{2})	16,824/sq mi (6,496/km^{2})
Passaic	New Jersey	70,537	3.13 sq mi (8.1 km^{2})	22,535/sq mi (8,701/km^{2})
Union City	New Jersey	68,589	1.29 sq mi (3.3 km^{2})	53,170/sq mi (20,530/km^{2})
Piscataway	New Jersey	60,804	18.79 sq mi (48.7 km^{2})	3,236/sq mi (1,249/km^{2})
Hoboken	New Jersey	60,419	1.25 sq mi (3.2 km^{2})	48,335/sq mi (18,662/km^{2})
White Plains	New York	59,559	9.74 sq mi (25.2 km^{2})	6,117/sq mi (2,362/km^{2})
Union	New Jersey	59,728	9.05 sq mi (23.4 km^{2})	6,600/sq mi (2,500/km^{2})
Perth Amboy	New Jersey	55,436	4.66 sq mi (12.1 km^{2})	11,896/sq mi (4,593/km^{2})
New Brunswick	New Jersey	55,266	5.23 sq mi (13.5 km^{2})	10,567/sq mi (4,080/km^{2})
Wayne	New Jersey	54,838	23.72 sq mi (61.4 km^{2})	2,312/sq mi (893/km^{2})
West Orange	New Jersey	48,843	12 sq mi (31 km^{2})	4,070/sq mi (1,570/km^{2})
Hackensack	New Jersey	46,030	4.19 sq mi (10.9 km^{2})	10,986/sq mi (4,242/km^{2})
Montclair	New Jersey	40,921	6.24 sq mi (16.2 km^{2})	6,558/sq mi (2,532/km^{2})
Fort Lee	New Jersey	40,191	2.52 sq mi (6.5 km^{2})	15,949/sq mi (6,158/km^{2})
Long Beach	New York	35,029	2.22 sq mi (5.7 km^{2})	15,793/sq mi (6,098/km^{2})
Long Branch	New Jersey	31,667	5.12 sq mi (13.3 km^{2})	6,185/sq mi (2,388/km^{2})
Westfield	New Jersey	31,032	6.72 sq mi (17.4 km^{2})	4,618/sq mi (1,783/km^{2})
Rahway	New Jersey	29,813	4.03 sq mi (10.4 km^{2})	7,586/sq mi (2,929/km^{2})
East Hampton	New York	28,385	74.33 sq mi (192.5 km^{2})	381.88/sq mi (147.44/km^{2})
Harrison	New York	28,218	16.77 sq mi (43.4 km^{2})	1,683/sq mi (650/km^{2})
Peekskill	New York	25,431	4.34 sq mi (11.2 km^{2})	5,854/sq mi (2,260/km^{2})
Morristown	New Jersey	20,180	2.91 sq mi (7.5 km^{2})	6,935/sq mi (2,678/km^{2})
South Orange	New Jersey	18,484	2.85 sq mi (7.4 km^{2})	6,846/sq mi (2,643/km^{2})
Rye	New York	16,592	5.85 sq mi (15.2 km^{2})	2,835/sq mi (1,095/km^{2})
Asbury Park	New Jersey	15,188	1.43 sq mi (3.7 km^{2})	10,621/sq mi (4,101/km^{2})
Red Bank	New Jersey	12,936	1.75 sq mi (4.5 km^{2})	7,392/sq mi (2,854/km^{2})
Freehold	New Jersey	12,538	1.93 sq mi (5.0 km^{2})	6,496/sq mi (2,508/km^{2})
Somerville	New Jersey	12,346	2.34 sq mi (6.1 km^{2})	5,276/sq mi (2,037/km^{2})
Milford	Pennsylvania	1,103	0.47 sq mi (1.2 km^{2})	2,352/sq mi (908/km^{2})
Trenton-Princeton MSA
Hamilton	New Jersey	92,297	39.44 sq mi (102.1 km^{2})	2,340/sq mi (900/km^{2})
Trenton	New Jersey	90,871	7.61 sq mi (19.7 km^{2})	11,941/sq mi (4,610/km^{2})
Ewing	New Jersey	37,264	15.21 sq mi (39.4 km^{2})	2,450/sq mi (950/km^{2})
Princeton	New Jersey	30,681	17.95 sq mi (46.5 km^{2})	1,709/sq mi (660/km^{2})
Bridgeport-Stamford-Norwalk-Danbury MSA
Bridgeport	Connecticut	148,654	16 sq mi (41 km^{2})	7,700/sq mi (3,000/km^{2})
Stamford	Connecticut	135,470	37.62 sq mi (97.4 km^{2})	3,601/sq mi (1,390/km^{2})
Norwalk	Connecticut	91,184	22.89 sq mi (59.3 km^{2})	3,984/sq mi (1,538/km^{2})
Danbury	Connecticut	86,518	41.95 sq mi (108.7 km^{2})	2,062/sq mi (796/km^{2})
Greenwich	Connecticut	63,518	47.8 sq mi (124 km^{2})	1,329/sq mi (513/km^{2})
Fairfield	Connecticut	61,512	29.9 sq mi (77 km^{2})	2,057/sq mi (794/km^{2})
Stratford	Connecticut	52,355	17.6 sq mi (46 km^{2})	2,975/sq mi (1,149/km^{2})
New Haven-Milford-Waterbury MSA
New Haven	Connecticut	135,081	18.69 sq mi (48.4 km^{2})	7,170/sq mi (2,770/km^{2})
Waterbury	Connecticut	114,403	28.52 sq mi (73.9 km^{2})	4,011/sq mi (1,549/km^{2})
Hamden	Connecticut	61,169	32.8 sq mi (85 km^{2})	1,800/sq mi (690/km^{2})
West Haven	Connecticut	55,584	10.75 sq mi (27.8 km^{2})	5,171/sq mi (1,997/km^{2})
Milford	Connecticut	50,558	21.91 sq mi (56.7 km^{2})	2,308/sq mi (891/km^{2})
Kiryas Joel-Poughkeepsie-Newburgh MSA
Kiryas Joel	New York	32,954	1.46 sq mi (3.8 km^{2})	22,571/sq mi (8,715/km^{2})
Poughkeepsie	New York	31,577	5.14 sq mi (13.3 km^{2})	6,137/sq mi (2,370/km^{2})
Middletown	New York	30,345	5.31 sq mi (13.8 km^{2})	5,719/sq mi (2,208/km^{2})
Newburgh	New York	28,856	3.81 sq mi (9.9 km^{2})	7,582/sq mi (2,927/km^{2})
Beacon	New York	13,769	4.74 sq mi (12.3 km^{2})	2,905/sq mi (1,122/km^{2})
Port Jervis	New York	8,775	2.53 sq mi (6.6 km^{2})	3,468/sq mi (1,339/km^{2})
Kingston MSA
Kingston	New York	24,069	7.48 sq mi (19.4 km^{2})	3,217/sq mi (1,242/km^{2})
New Paltz	New York	7,324	1.76 sq mi (4.6 km^{2})	4,157/sq mi (1,605/km^{2})
East Stroudsburg MSA
East Stroudsburg	Pennsylvania	9,669	2.84 sq mi (7.4 km^{2})	3,400/sq mi (1,300/km^{2})
Stroudsburg	Pennsylvania	5,927	1.73 sq mi (4.5 km^{2})	3,436/sq mi (1,327/km^{2})
Torrington μSA
Torrington	Connecticut	35,515	39.77 sq mi (103.0 km^{2})	893/sq mi (345/km^{2})

=== Urban areas ===
Urban areas within the New York City combined statistical area as of the 2020 census. At the core of the New York combined statistical area (CSA) lies the New York–Jersey City–Newark, NY–NJ urban area, the largest in the United States by both area and population. Within the boundaries of the CSA the Census Bureau defines 32 other urban areas as well, some forming the core of their own metropolitan areas not within the New York metropolitan statistical area. Urban areas situated primarily outside the New York metropolitan statistical area but within the CSA are identified with a cross (†). Urban areas Counties in the New York MSA Counties in the New York CSA but not the MSA

Urban area	Population (2020 census)	Land area (sq mi)	Land area (km^{2})	Density (population / sq mi)	Density (population / km^{2})
New York–Jersey City–Newark, NY–NJ	19,426,449	3,248.12	8,412.59	5,980.83	2,309.21
Bridgeport–Stamford, CT–NY †	916,408	397.29	1,028.98	2,306.63	890.60
New Haven, CT †	561,456	298.01	771.85	1,884.00	727.42
Trenton, NJ †	370,422	133.13	344.81	2,782.39	1,074.29
Poughkeepsie–Newburgh, NY †	314,766	209.92	543.69	1,499.45	578.94
Waterbury, CT †	199,317	92.44	239.41	2,156.22	832.52
Danbury, CT–NY †	171,680	118.49	306.88	1,448.92	559.43
Kiryas Joel, NY †	71,582	28.75	74.47	2,489.47	961.19
Middletown, NY †	61,516	25.96	67.24	2,369.55	914.89
Riverhead–Southold, NY	51,120	52.80	136.74	968.25	373.84
Kingston, NY †	50,254	31.10	80.54	1,615.96	623.93
East Stroudsburg–Stroudsburg, PA †	47,891	38.94	100.85	1,229.95	474.89
Torrington, CT †	35,212	21.76	56.36	1,618.24	624.81
Hamburg–Vernon–Highland Lakes, NJ	28,250	21.81	56.48	1,295.53	500.21
Ridgefield, CT †	25,683	28.80	74.59	891.77	344.32
Coolbaugh–Pocono Pines, PA †	24,893	19.74	51.13	1,260.93	486.85
Flemington–Raritan, NJ	24,401	18.39	47.64	1,326.60	512.20
Mystic Island–Little Egg Harbor, NJ	23,074	12.97	33.60	1,778.41	686.65
East Hampton North–Springs–Northwest Harbor, NY	21,812	35.85	92.86	608.39	234.90
West Milford, NJ–NY	17,659	14.22	36.83	1,241.82	479.47
Port Jervis, NY–PA	16,187	7.59	19.65	2,133.62	823.80
Clinton, NJ	16,136	10.46	27.10	1,541.92	595.34
Walden, NY †	15,784	11.56	29.95	1,365.14	527.08
Lake Mohawk, NJ	13,164	8.23	21.32	1,598.92	617.35
Newton, NJ	12,813	7.90	20.47	1,621.50	626.06
New Paltz, NY †	9,969	4.89	12.66	2,039.69	787.53
Oak Ridge, NJ	8,871	5.41	14.01	1,640.23	633.30
Winsted, CT †	7,804	6.12	15.86	1,274.47	492.08
Ellenville, NY †	7,090	3.30	8.56	2,146.31	828.70
Warwick, NY †	7,084	2.92	7.56	2,427.84	937.40
Chester, NY †	5,900	4.57	11.84	1,290.39	498.22
Montauk, NY	3,845	5.93	15.35	648.76	250.49
Palmyra, PA	3,772	8.30	21.49	454.71	175.56

== History ==
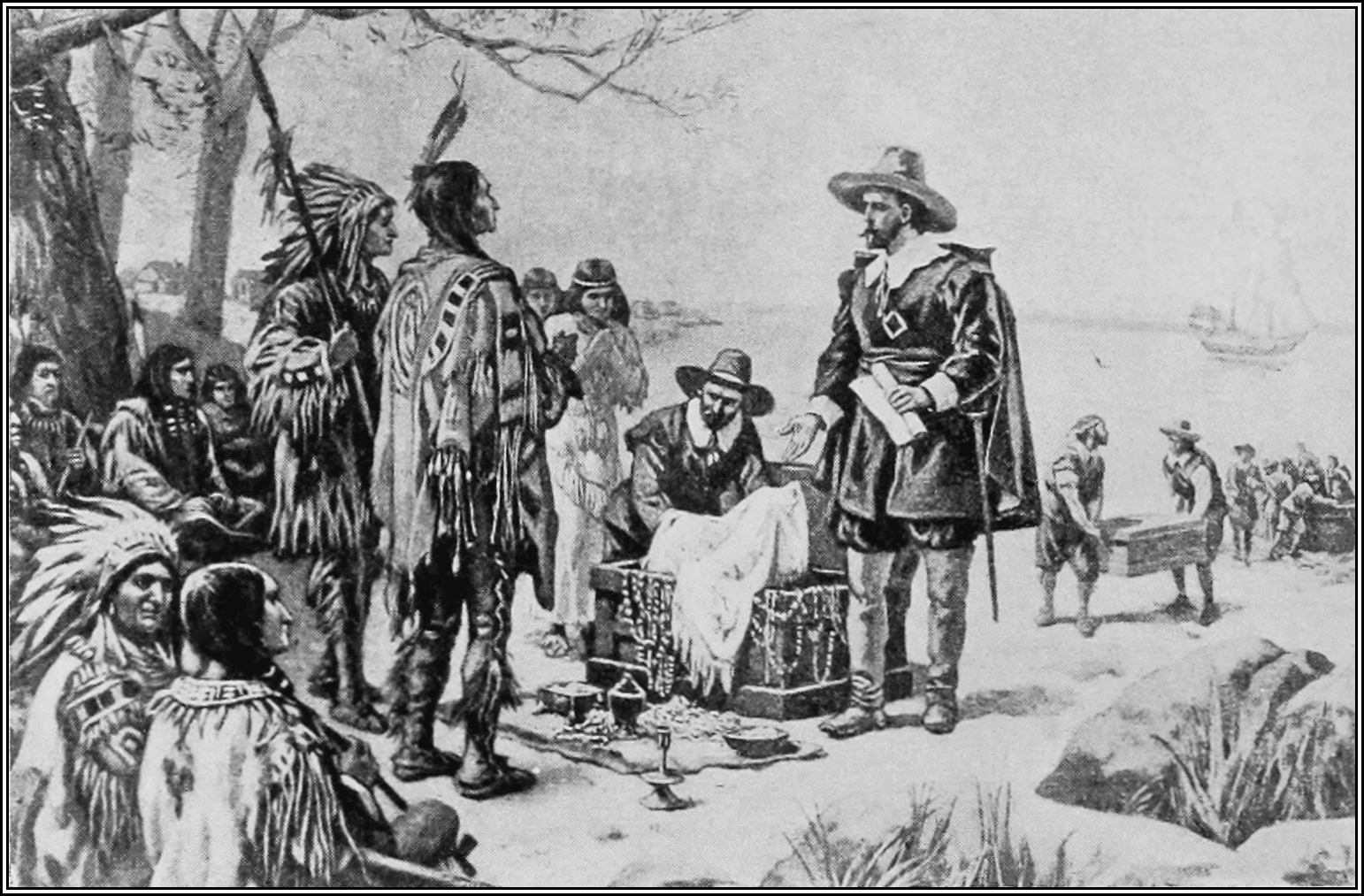
Peter Minuit, who purchased Manhattan in 1626

During the Wisconsinan glaciation, the region was situated at the edge of a large ice sheet over 1,000 feet in depth. The ice sheet scraped away large amounts of soil, leaving the bedrock that serves as the geologic foundation for much of the New York metropolitan region today. Later on, the ice sheet would help split apart what are now Long Island and Staten Island.

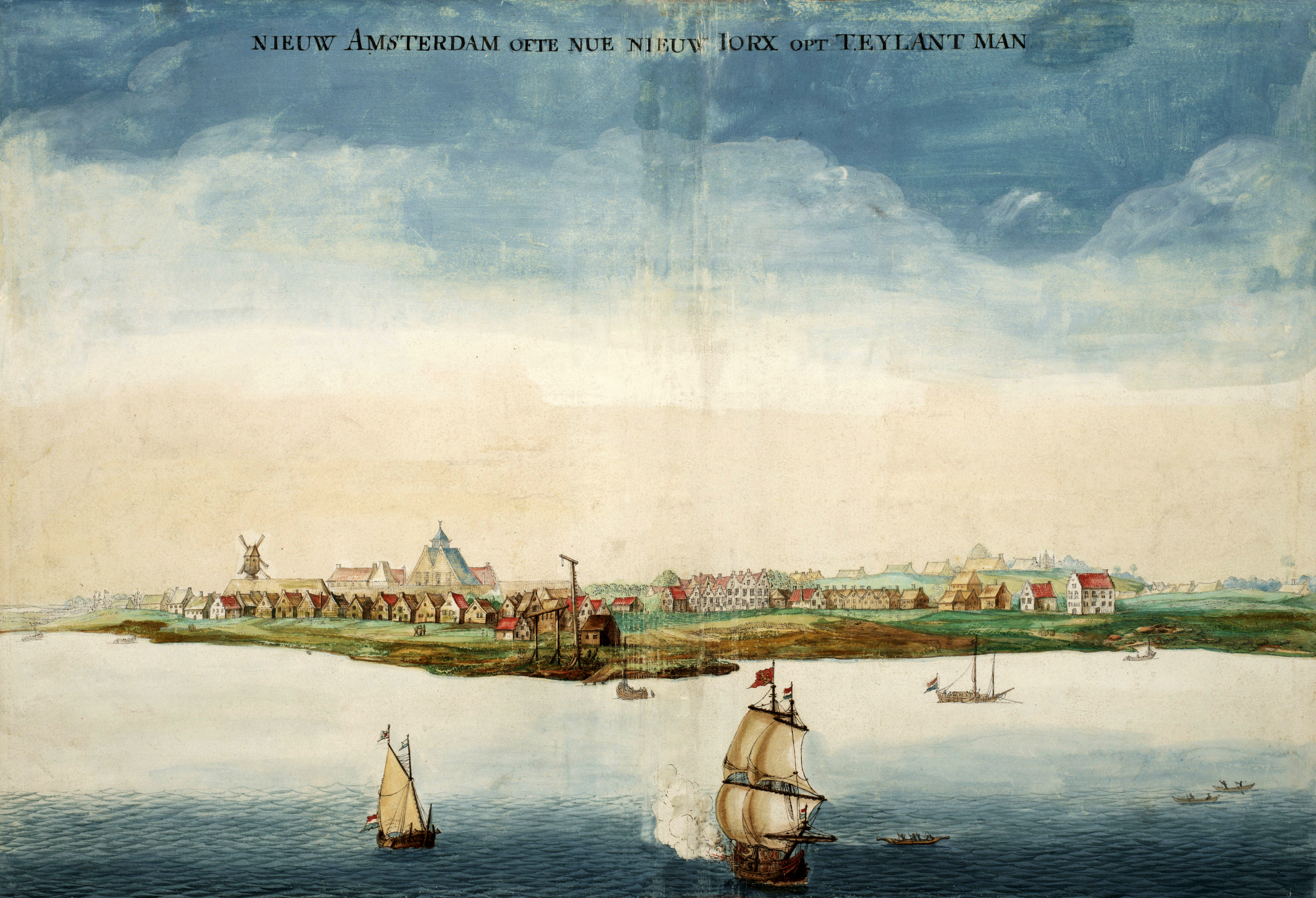
New Amsterdam, including present-day Lower Manhattan, in 1664, the year England took control and renamed it New York

At the time of European contact the region was inhabited by Native Americans, predominantly the Lenape, and others. The Native Americans used the abundant waterways in the area for many purposes, such as fishing and trade routes. Sailing for France in 1524, Giovanni da Verrazzano was the first European to enter the local waters and encounter the residents, but he did not make landfall. Henry Hudson, sailing for the Dutch in 1609, visited the area and built a settlement on Lower Manhattan Island that was eventually renamed New Amsterdam by Dutch colonists in 1626. In 1664, the area went under English control, and was later renamed New York after King Charles II of England granted the lands to his brother, the Duke of York.

As the fur trade expanded further north, New York became a trading hub, which brought in a diverse set of ethnic groups including Africans, Jews, and Portuguese. The island of Manhattan had an extraordinary natural harbor formed by New York Bay (actually the drowned lower river valley of the Hudson River, enclosed by glacial moraines), the East River, which is a tidal strait, and the Hudson River, all of which merge at the southern tip, from which all later development spread. During the American Revolution, the strategic waterways made New York vitally important as a wartime base for the British navy. Many battles such as the Battle of Long Island and the Battle of New York were fought in the region to secure it. New York was captured by the British early in the war, becoming a haven for Loyalist refugees from other parts of the country, and remained in the hands of the British until the war ended in 1783. New York served as the capital of the United States from 1785 until 1790, after which the capital moved to Philadelphia. New York has been the country's largest city since 1790. In 1792, the Buttonwood Agreement, made by a group of merchants, created what is now the New York Stock Exchange in Lower Manhattan. Today, many people in the metropolitan area work in this important stock exchange.

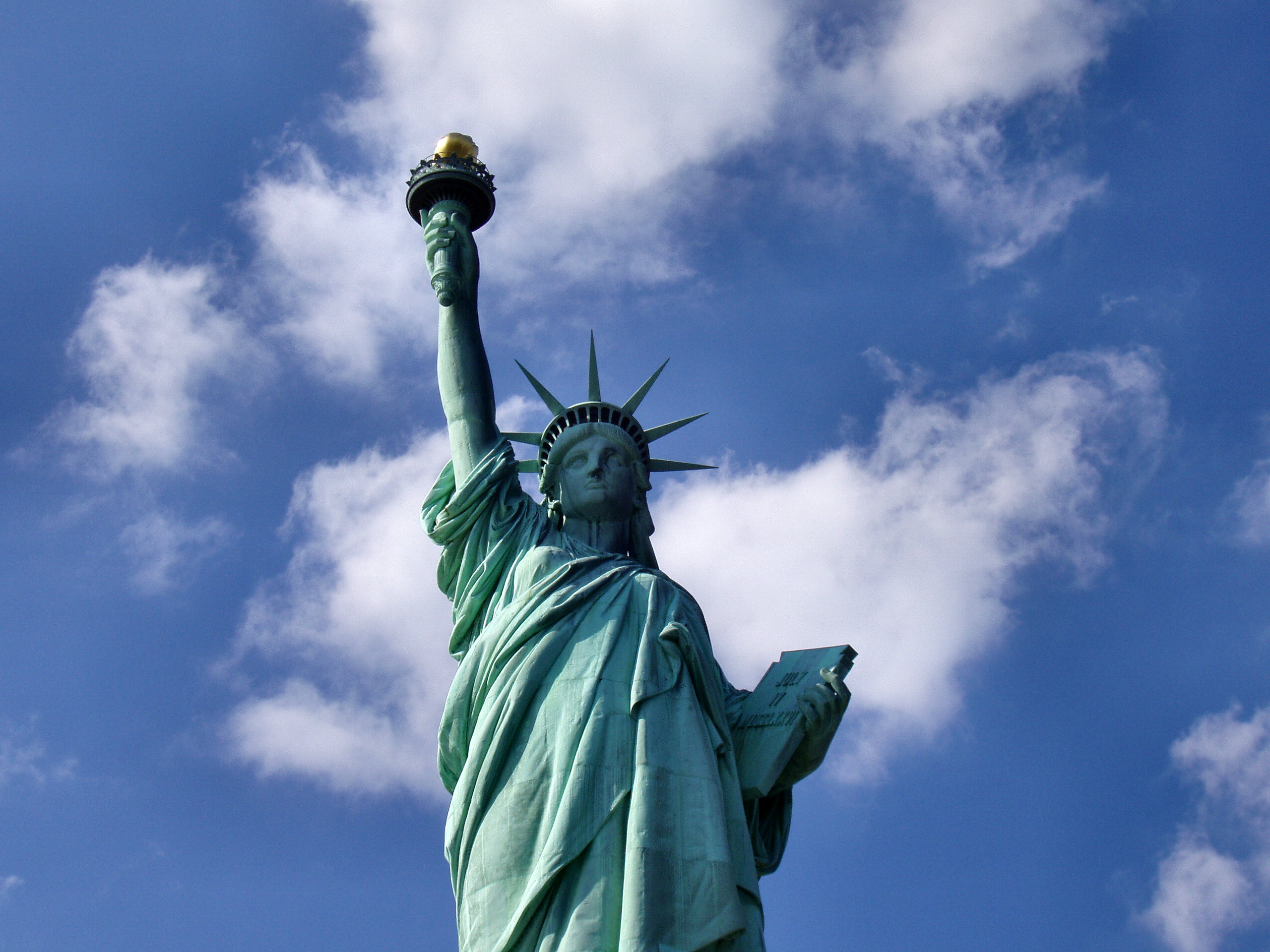
Liberty Enlightening the World, known as the Statue of Liberty, on Liberty Island in New York Harbor, a globally recognized symbol of both the United States and its ideals of freedom, democracy, and opportunity.

The Statue of Liberty in New York Harbor greeted millions of immigrants as they came to America by ship in the late 19th and early 20th centuries and is a globally recognized symbol of the United States and its democracy. Large-scale immigration into New York was a result of a large demand for manpower. A cosmopolitan attitude in the city created tolerance for various cultures and ethnic groups. German, Irish, and Italian immigrants were among the largest ethnic groups. Today, many of their descendants continue to live in the region. Cultural buildings such as the Metropolitan Museum of Art, the Metropolitan Opera, and the American Museum of Natural History were built. New York newspapers were read around the country as media moguls James Gordon Bennett, Sr., Joseph Pulitzer and William Randolph Hearst battled for readership. In 1884, over 70% of exports passed through ports in New York or in one of the surrounding towns. The five boroughs of New York — The Bronx, Brooklyn, Manhattan, Queens, and Staten Island — were consolidated into a single city in 1898.

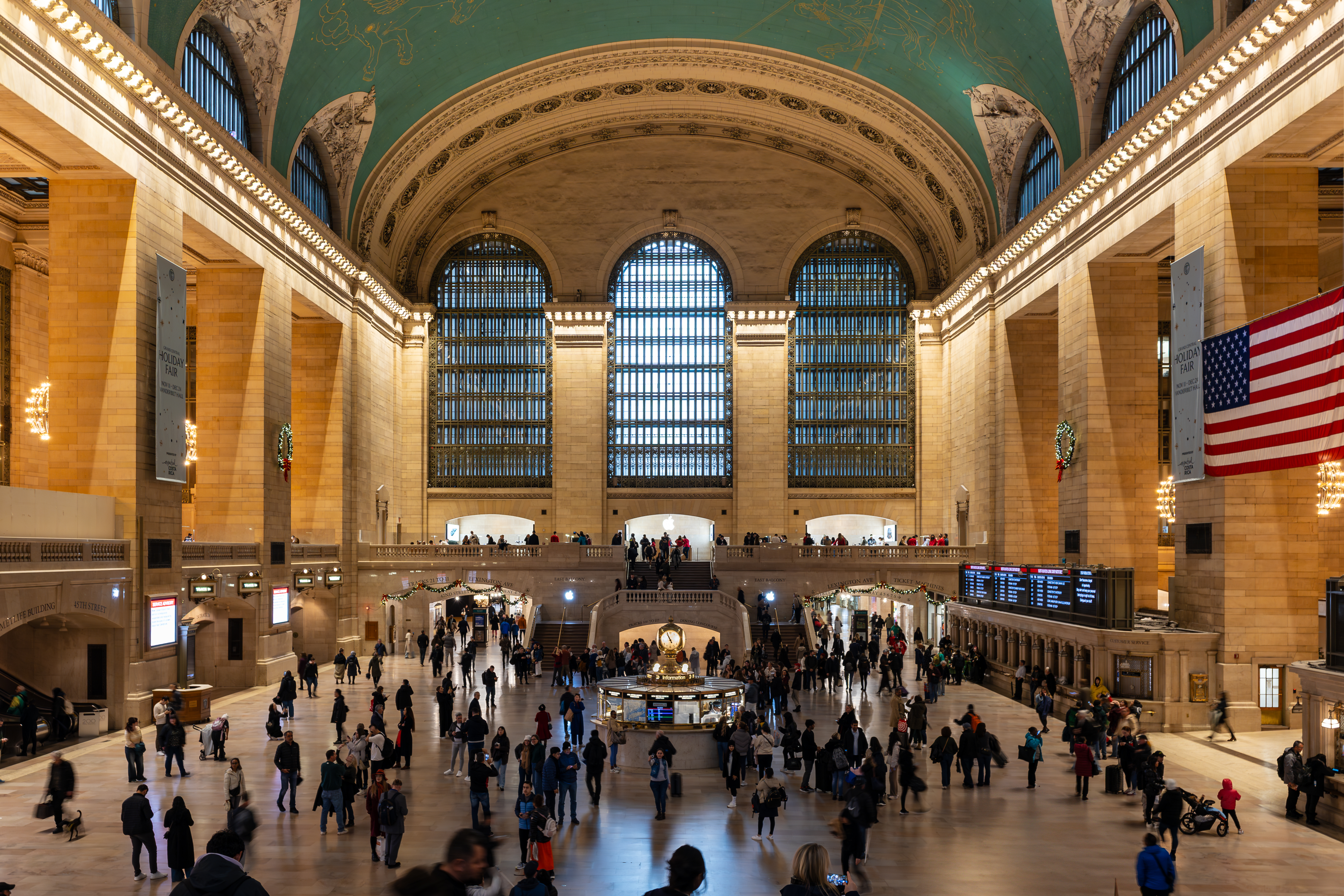
The main concourse of Grand Central Terminal in Manhattan, which opened in 1913

The newly unified New York City encouraged both more physical connections between the boroughs and the growth of bedroom communities. The New York City Subway began operating in 1904 as the Interborough Rapid Transit Company, one of three systems (the other two being the Brooklyn-Manhattan Transit Corporation and the Independent Subway System) that were later taken over by the city. Railroad stations such as Grand Central Terminal and Pennsylvania Station helped fuel suburban growth. During the era of the Prohibition, when alcohol was banned nationwide, organized crime grew to supply the high demand for bootleg alcohol. The Broadway Theater District began to develop with the opening of the New York Subway in 1904 and, by the early part of the twentieth century, had been made world-famous as New York's theatrical and entertainment center through popular musical productions like Ziegfeld Follies and Show Boat and the opening of multiple large, extravagantly decorated theatres in the area spanning Broadway from 47th to 42nd Streets.

The Great Depression suspended the region's fortunes as a period of widespread unemployment and poverty began. City planner Robert Moses began his automobile-centered career of building bridges, parkways, and later expressways across the tri-state area. During World War II, the city economy was hurt by blockades of German U-boats, which limited shipping with Europe.

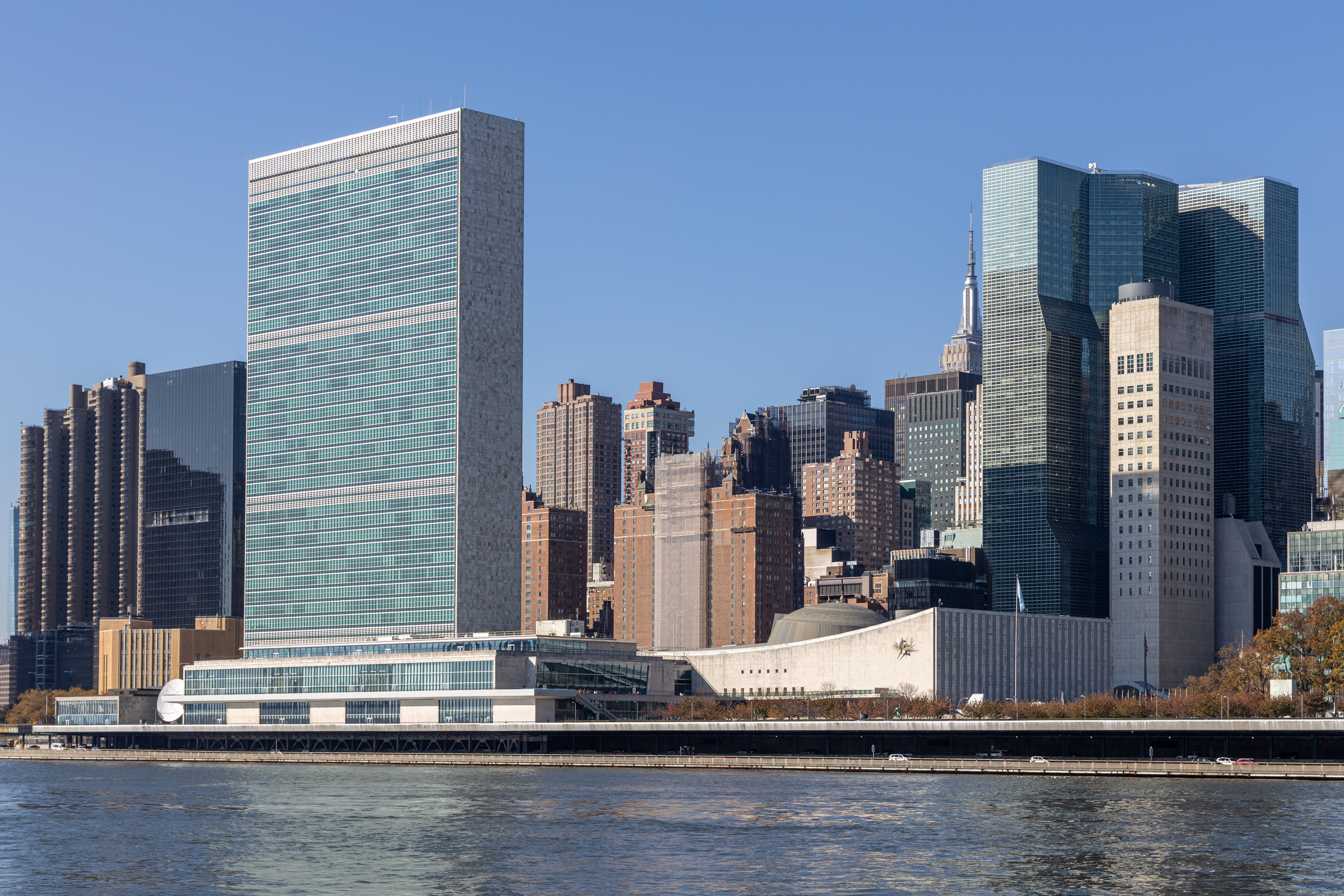
United Nations Headquarters, established in Midtown Manhattan in 1952

After its population peaked in 1950, a significant portion of the city's population left for the suburbs of New York over the following decades. The effects were a result of white flight. Industry and commerce also declined in this era, with businesses relocating to the suburbs or other regions. The era also saw an increase in the construction of housing projects for the city's low-income population under the New York City Housing Authority, coinciding with the destruction of communities to construct interstate highways to link the city with its suburbs. The city, particularly Brooklyn, was dealt a psychological as well as an economic blow with the loss of the iconic Brooklyn Dodgers major-league baseball team, which moved to Los Angeles after the 1957 season. Crime affected the city severely. Urban renewal projects alleviated decay in poorer neighborhoods to a certain extent, but many of these later proved to be failures and caused unanticipated consequences like ghettoization, informal racial segregation in housing, and disruption of the organic urban fabric that made the city's neighborhoods cohesive and healthy places to live. There was little reported social unrest during the Northeast Blackout of 1965, but the New York City Blackout of 1977 led to massive rioting, looting, and arson in some parts of the city. In addition, the 1970s recession crippled traditional industries such as manufacturing in the New York City region. A rare positive highlight of the period was the completion of the original World Trade Center, a massive office complex in New York's Financial District whose iconic, 110-story Twin Towers for a short time stood as the world's tallest buildings.

In the 1980s, the city's economy was booming, particularly in the financial sector. Wall Street was fueling an economic surge in the real estate market, and later the dot-com bubble. Despite this, crime was still an issue. This was exacerbated by the crack epidemic, with the New York City area being one of the major ports of entry for narcotics entering the United States. Neighborhoods such as the South Bronx became prime examples of late 20th century urban decay. Beginning in the 1990s, however, crime dropped substantially due to tough-on-crime policies. Crime in New York City has continued to decline through the 21st century.

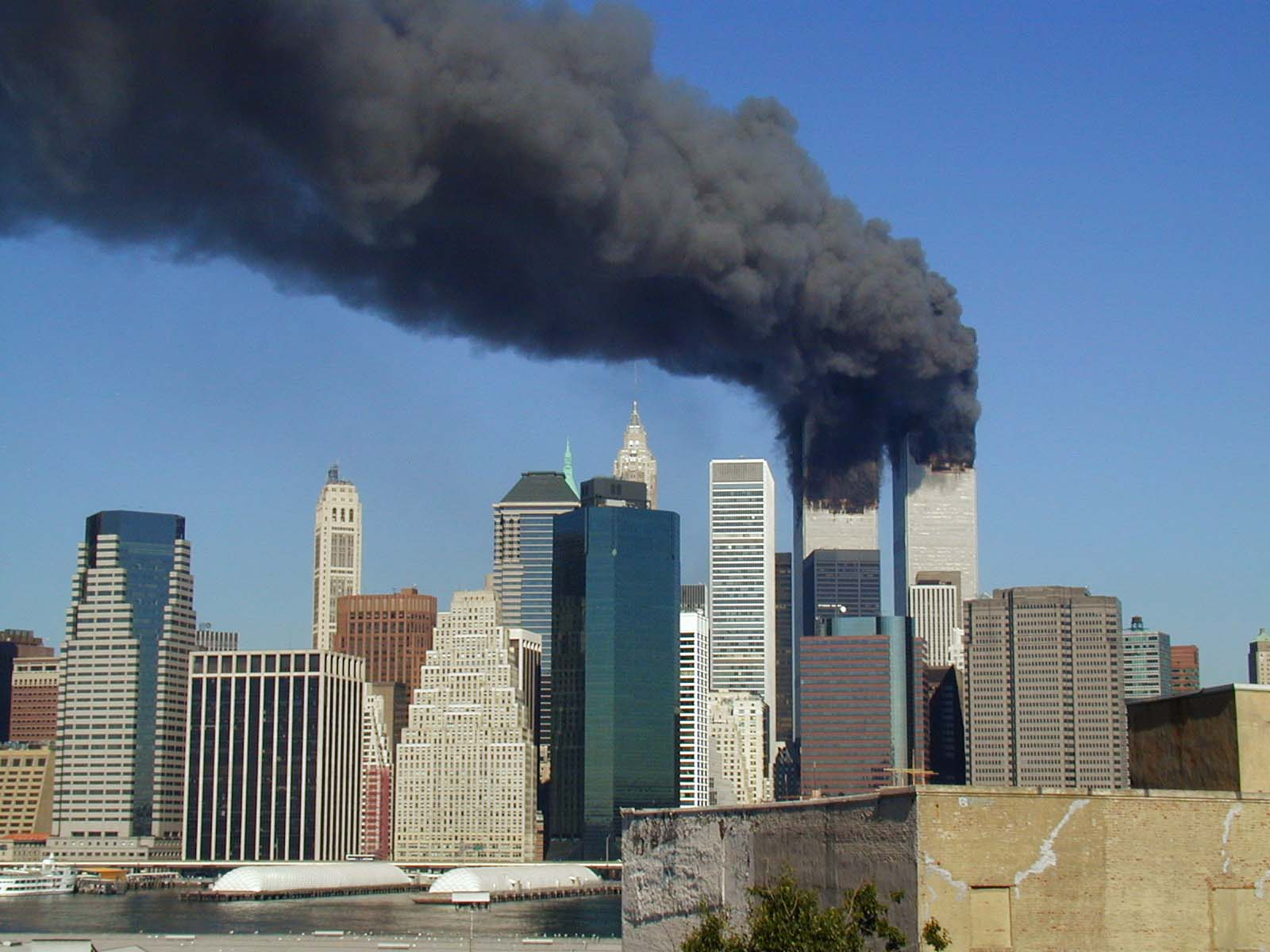
The World Trade Center in Lower Manhattan during the September 11 attacks in 2001, which caused nearly 3,000 deaths, most of whom were residents of the New York metropolitan region.

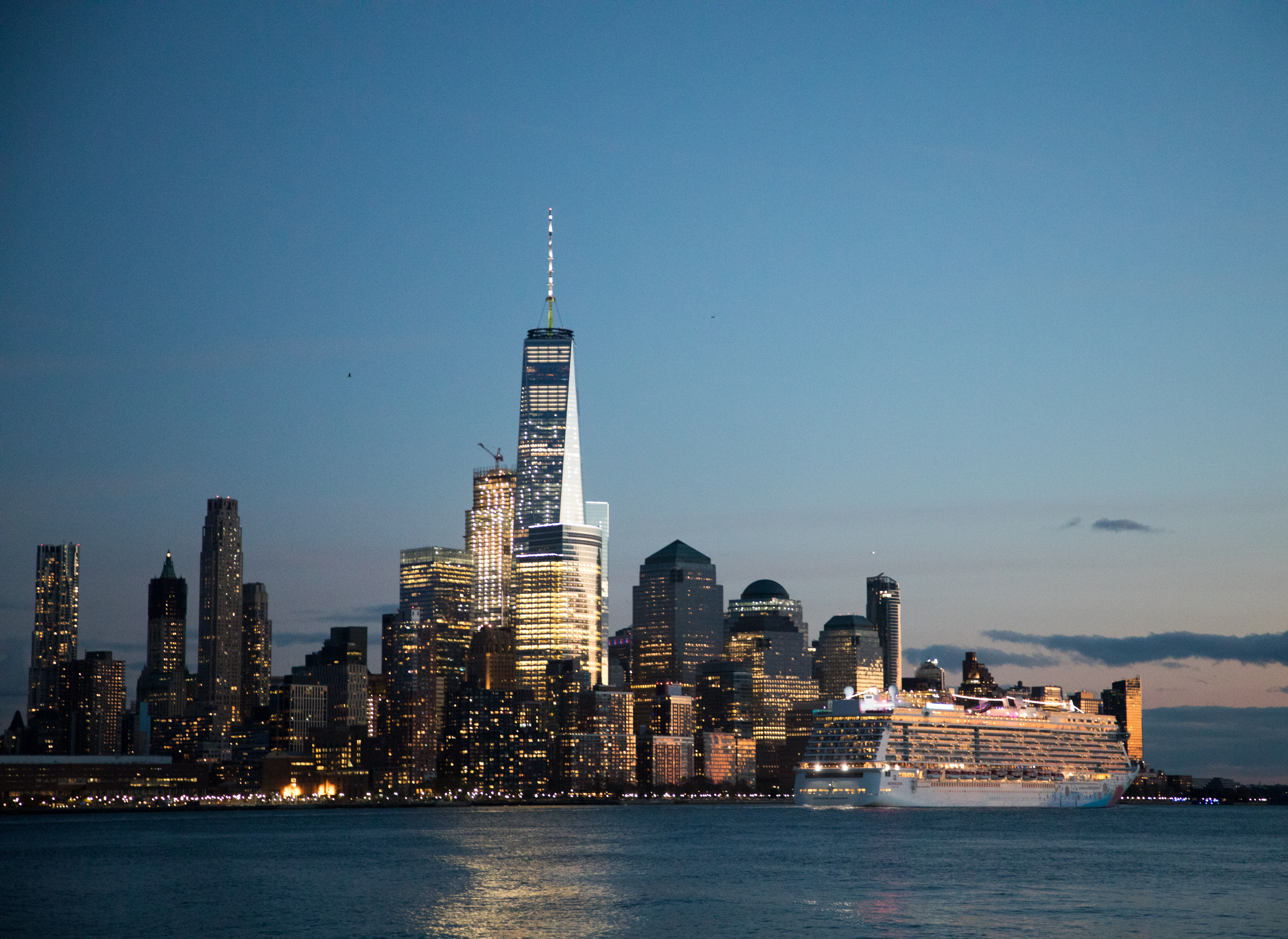
One World Trade Center, built to replace the World Trade Center, and opened in 2014.

The September 11th attacks in 2001 were pivotal in the region and nation's history. The attacks killed nearly 3,000 people as two planes crashed into the former World Trade Center and caused the towers to collapse. Businesses led an exodus from Lower Manhattan because of this but were replaced by an increased number of high-rise residences and a building boom in New York continues to this day.

In 2003, another blackout occurred, the 2003 North America blackout, but the city suffered no looting.

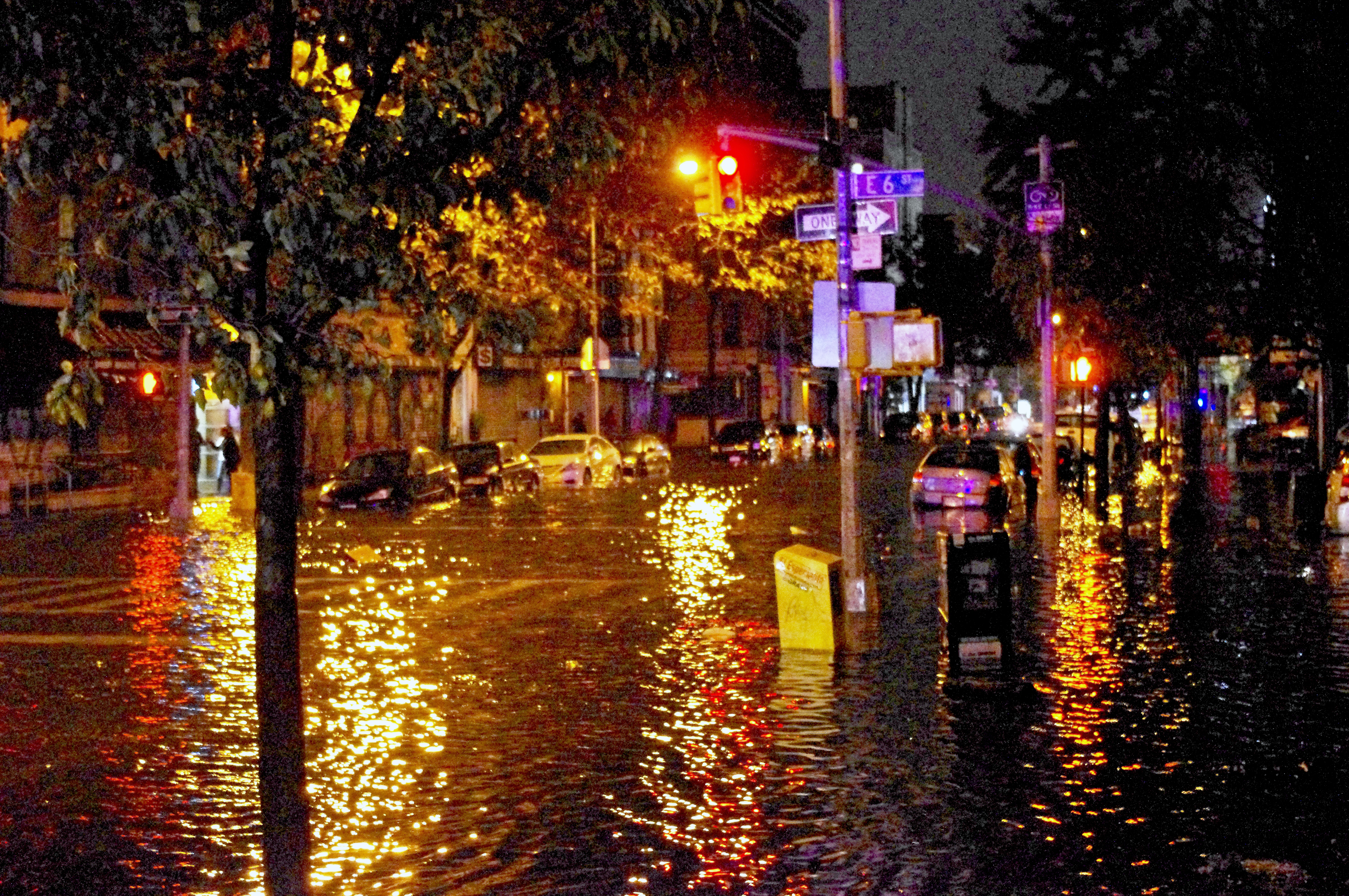
A flooded Avenue C in Manhattan just moments before the explosion at an electrical substation

On October 29 and 30, 2012, Hurricane Sandy caused extensive destruction in the metropolitan area, ravaging portions of the Atlantic coastline with record-high storm surge, severe flooding, and high winds, causing power outages for millions of residents via downed trees and power lines and malfunctions at electrical substations, leading to gasoline shortages and snarling mass transit systems. Damage to New York and New Jersey in terms of physical infrastructure and private property as well as including interrupted commerce was estimated at several tens of billions of dollars. The storm and its profound impacts have prompted the discussion of constructing seawalls and other coastal barriers around the shorelines of the metropolitan area to minimize the risk of destructive consequences from another such event in the future.

One World Trade Center, also known as Freedom Tower, was completed in 2014 to replace the fallen Twin Towers.

The 2017–2021 New York City transit crisis, which began with what media outlets referred to as the 2017 "summer of hell," led New York Governor Andrew Cuomo to declare a state of emergency. The crisis was due to the interaction of multiple severe problems in the New York City Subway system and in New York City bus lines, as well as at Penn Station, the final stop on several of the commuter lines connecting New York City with other parts of the metropolitan area. Its root causes included long-term neglect of critical infrastructure and lack of adequate funding for ongoing operations, among others. The state of emergency was formally ended on June 30, 2021.

=== Statistical history ===
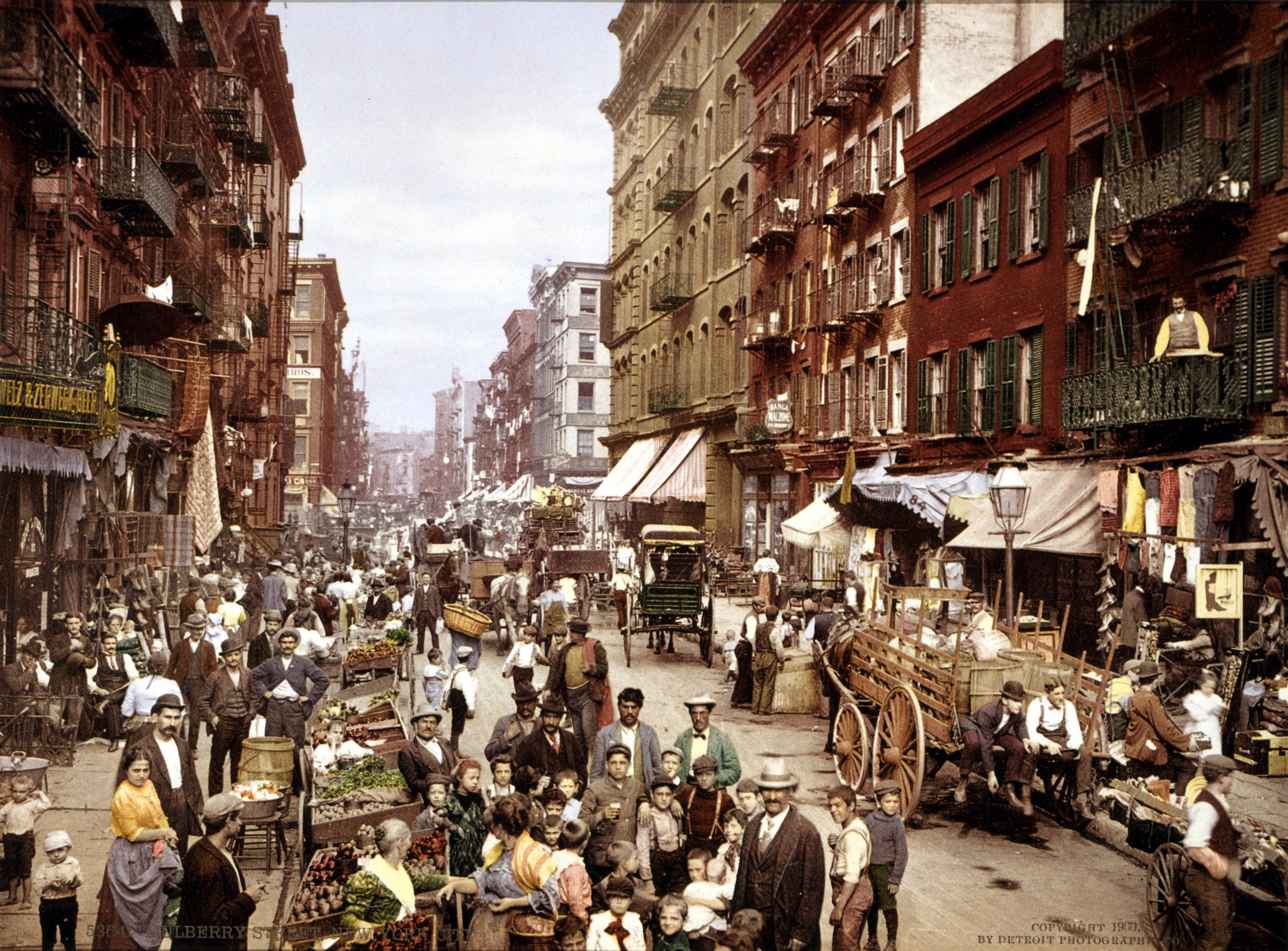
Little Italy on the Lower East Side of Manhattan, c. 1900

The U.S. Census Bureau first designated metropolitan areas in 1950 as standard metropolitan areas (SMAs). The "New York–Northeastern NJ SMA" was defined to include 17 counties: 9 in New York (the five boroughs of New York City, Nassau, Suffolk, Westchester, and Rockland) and 8 in New Jersey (Bergen, Hudson, Passaic, Essex, Union, Morris, Somerset, and Middlesex). In 1960, the metropolitan area standards were modified and renamed standard metropolitan statistical areas (SMSAs). The new standards resulted in the splitting of the former SMA into several pieces: the nine New York counties became the "New York SMSA"; three of the New Jersey counties (Essex, Union, and Morris) became the "Newark SMSA"; two other New Jersey counties (Bergen and Passaic) became the "Paterson–Passaic–Clifton SMSA"; Hudson County was designated the "Jersey City SMSA"; and Middlesex and Somerset counties lost their metropolitan status. In 1973, a new set of metropolitan area standards resulted in further changes: Nassau and Suffolk counties were split off as their own SMSA ("Nassau–Suffolk SMSA"); Bergen County (originally part of the Paterson–Clifton–Passaic SMSA) was transferred to the New York SMSA; the New York SMSA also received Putnam County (previously non-metropolitan); Somerset County was added to the Newark SMSA; and two new SMSAs, the "New Brunswick–Perth Amboy–Sayreville SMSA" (Middlesex County) and "Long Branch–Asbury Park SMSA" (Monmouth County), were established. In 1983, the concept of a consolidated metropolitan statistical area (CMSA) was first implemented. A CMSA consisted of several primary metropolitan statistical areas (PMSAs), which were individual employment centers within a wider labor market area. The "New York–Northern New Jersey–Long Island CMSA" consisted of 12 PMSAs.

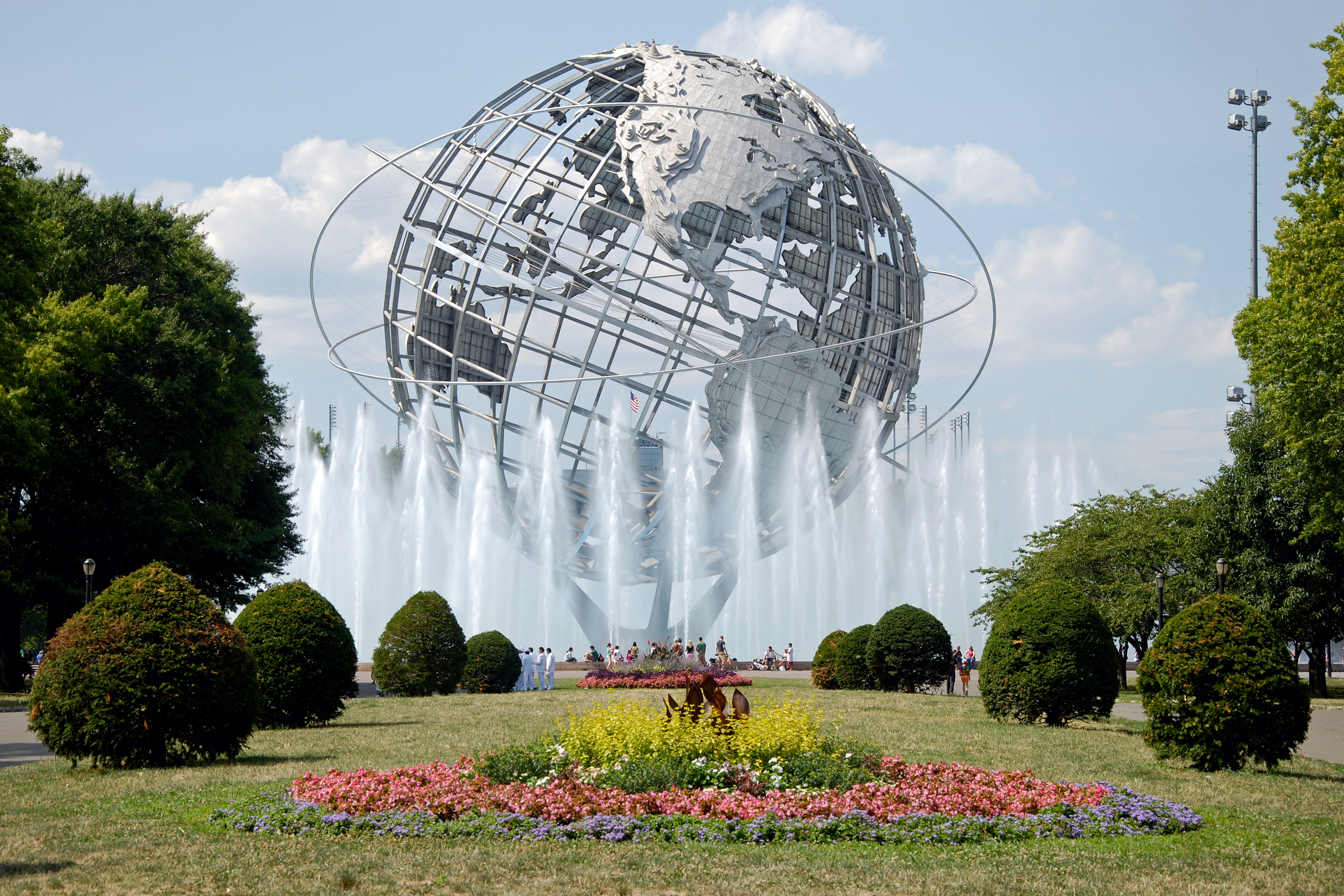
Unisphere in Flushing Meadows – Corona Park, iconic of Queens, the most ethnically diverse U.S. county and a borough of New York

Seven PMSAs were based on the original 1950 New York SMA that were split up: New York, Bergen–Passaic, Jersey City, Middlesex–Somerset–Hunterdon (Hunterdon added for the first time), Monmouth–Ocean (Ocean added for the first time), Nassau–Suffolk, and Newark (Sussex added for the first time). One additional PMSA was the Orange County PMSA (previously the Newburgh–Middletown SMSA). The other four PMSAs were former SMSAs in Connecticut: Bridgeport, Stamford, Norwalk, and Danbury. In 1993, four PMSAs were added to the New York–Northern New Jersey–Long Island CMSA: Trenton PMSA (Mercer County), Dutchess County PMSA, Waterbury PMSA, and New Haven PMSA. Several new counties were also added to the CMSA: Sussex, Warren, and Pike. The CMSA model was originally utilized for tabulating data from the 2000 census. In 2003, a new set of standards was established using the Core Based Statistical Area (CBSA) model was adopted and remains in use as of 2010. The CBSA model resulted in the splitting up of the old CMSA into several metropolitan statistical areas: New York–Northern New Jersey–Long Island, Poughkeepsie–Newburgh–Middletown, Trenton–Princeton, Bridgeport–Stamford–Norwalk (includes Danbury), and New Haven–Milford (includes Waterbury). In 2013, the Census Bureau added Carbon, Lehigh, Northampton, and Monroe counties in Pennsylvania, and Warren County, New Jersey (encompassing collectively the Allentown-Bethlehem-Easton, PA-NJ MSA and the East Stroudsburg, PA MSA), to the Combined Statistical Area, and assimilated Poughkeepsie–Newburgh–Middletown into the larger New York–Northern New Jersey–Long Island–NY–NJ–PA MSA. In 2018, the Allentown-Bethlehem-Easton, PA-NJ MSA was removed from the Combined Statistical Area.

The July 2023 revision of the New York–Newark, NY–NJ–CT–PA CSA had the following municipality changes from the March 2020 definitions:

Additions to the CSA:

- Sullivan County, NY (Monticello, NY μSA)

Removals from the CSA:

- City of Shelton, CT (from the erstwhile Bridgeport–Stamford–Norwalk, CT MSA)
- Monroe County, PA (from the erstwhile East Stroudsburg, PA MSA)
- New Haven County, CT (from the erstwhile New Haven–Milford, CT MSA)
- Litchfield County, CT (from the Torrington, CT μSA), except for the Towns of Bridgewater and New Milford

=== Proposals for the region ===
The metropolitan region has never had separate political representation from the rest of their original states. This has to do with disagreements in the desired model and the constitutional complexity of the metropolitan region being cross-state. Within the State of New York over the last 30 years, discussions have emerged of splitting the states into different regions with separate governors and legislators whilst remaining part of the same state — as opposed to seeing New York and its metropolitan area being split into a separate state. The idea has been seen by Republicans in the state as an opportunity to dislocate the Democratic party's hold in the state legislature.

The discussion surrounding the re-organization of New York State has commonly been in two models: The two-region model creates a "downstate" New York region which would consist of all five New York City boroughs, Long Island's Nassau and Suffolk counties, and Westchester and Rockland counties, then Upstate would be the remaining 53; and the three-region model is New York having five counties; Montauk would consist of Nassau, Suffolk, Rockland, and Westchester counties and; New Amsterdam would be the remaining portion of New York State. This debate was reported as recent as February 2019, when Republican state Senator Daphne Jordan supported the state being split into two states; however, it was believed that the proposal would require an act of Congress for it to be passed.

== Demographics ==
Population density in the New York urban area

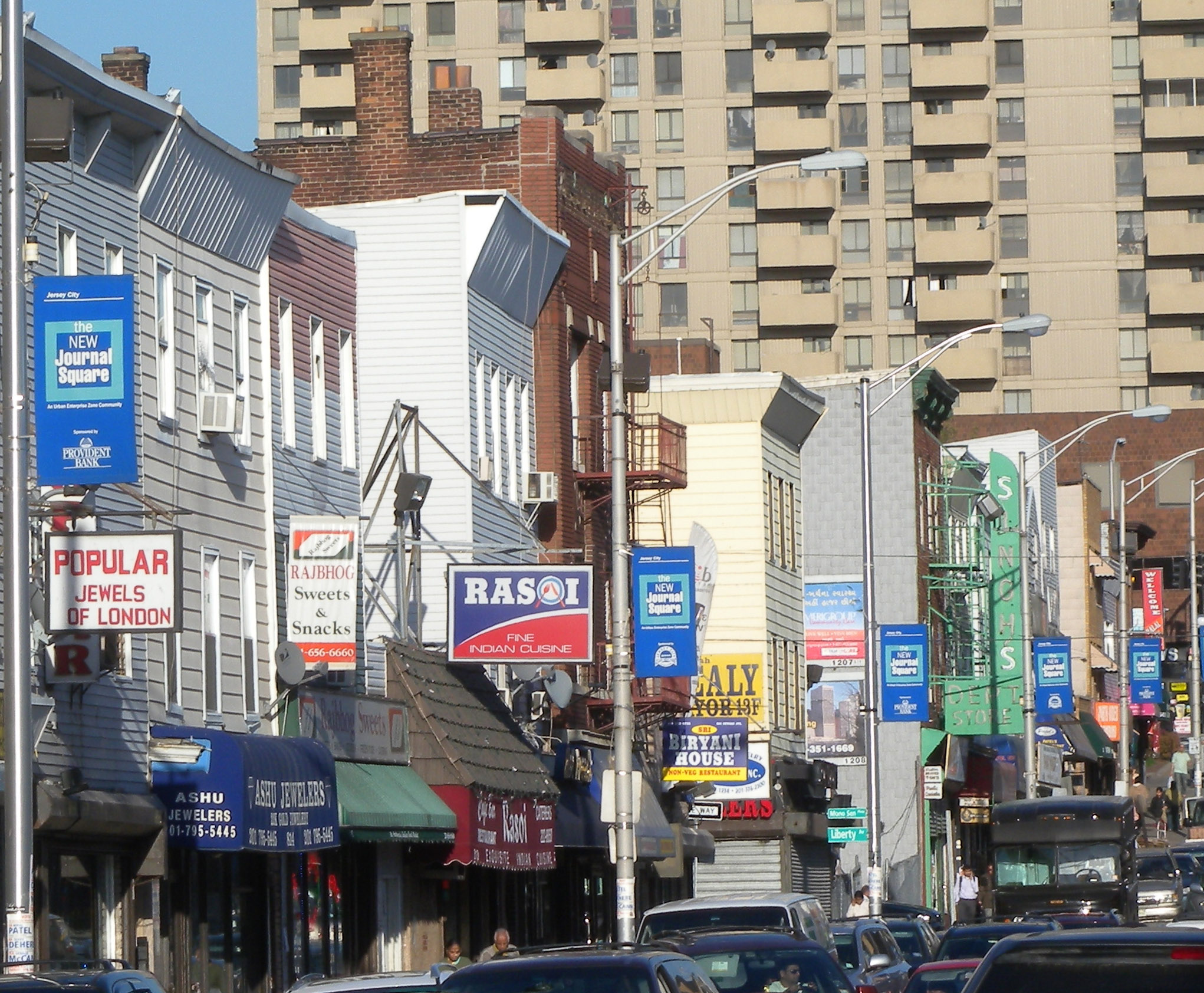
India Square in Jersey City, New Jersey, known as Little Bombay, home to the highest concentration of Asian Indians in the Western Hemisphere.

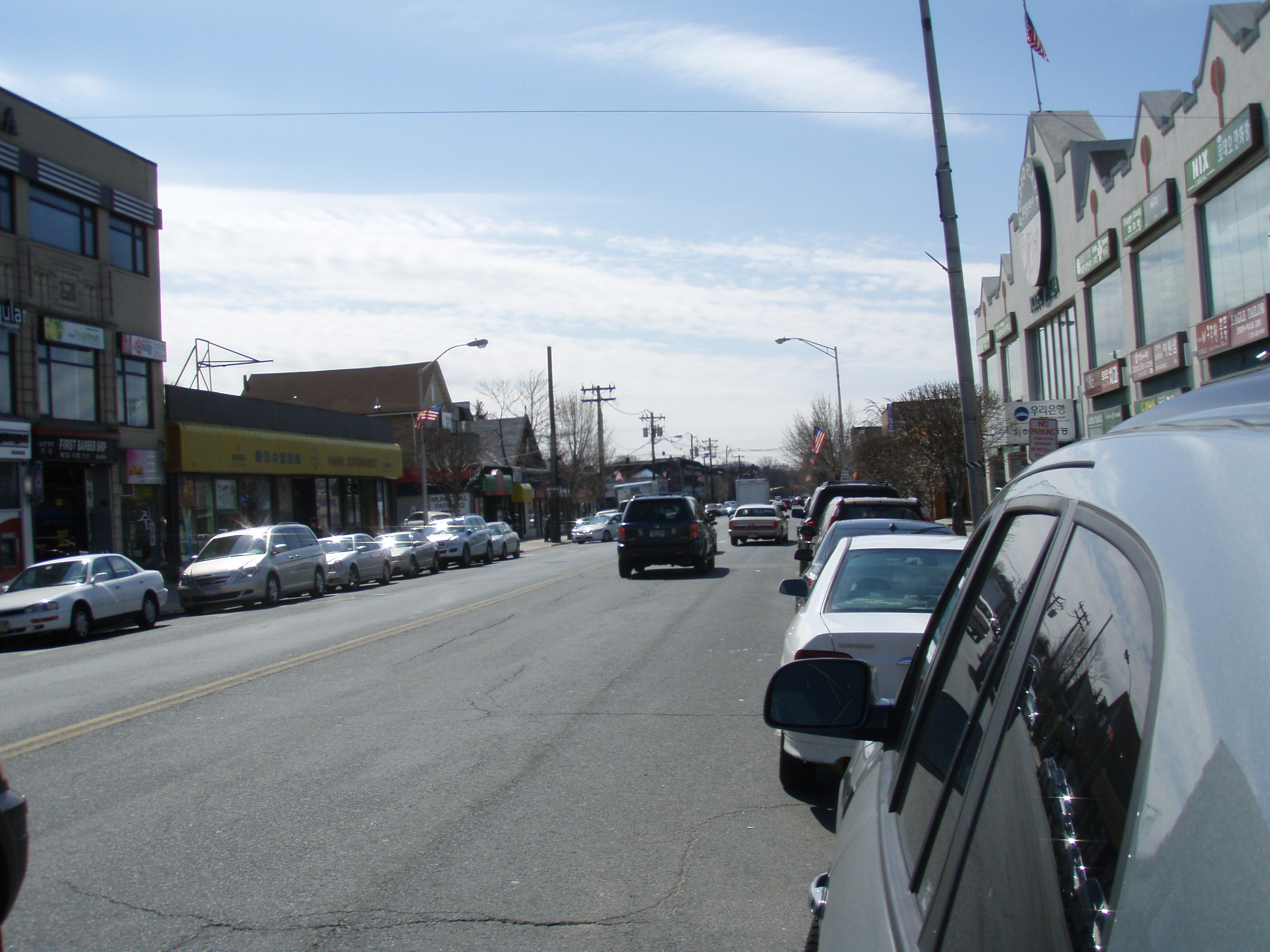
Bergen County, New Jersey, home to each of the top ten municipalities by percentage of Korean population, led by Palisades Park (above), a borough where Koreans constitute the majority (52%) of the population

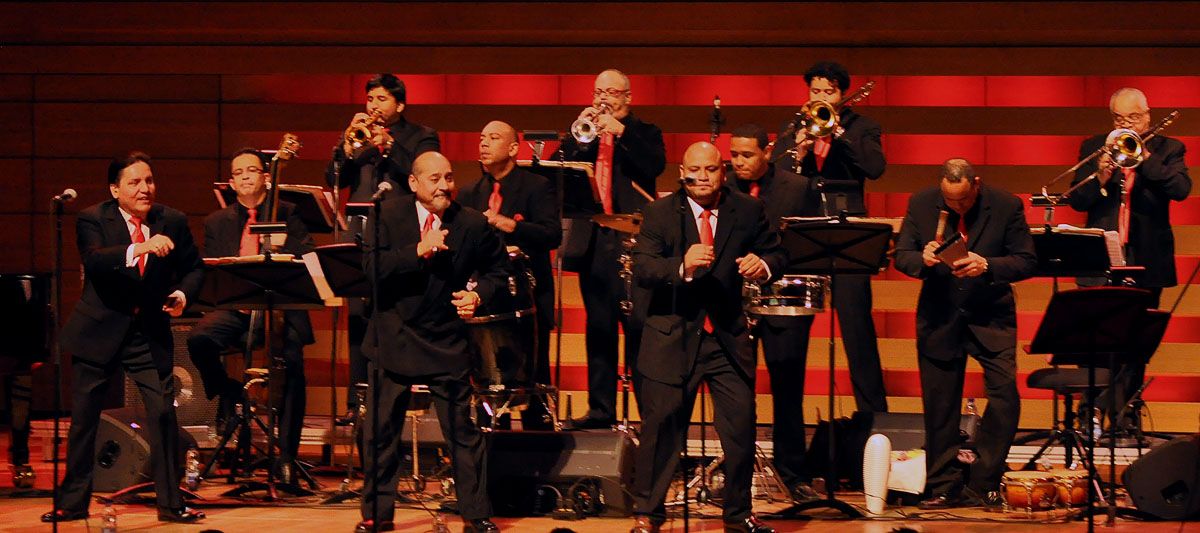
Spanish Harlem Orchestra in Spanish Harlem; New York City is home to nearly three million Latino Americans, the largest Hispanic population of any city outside Latin America and Spain

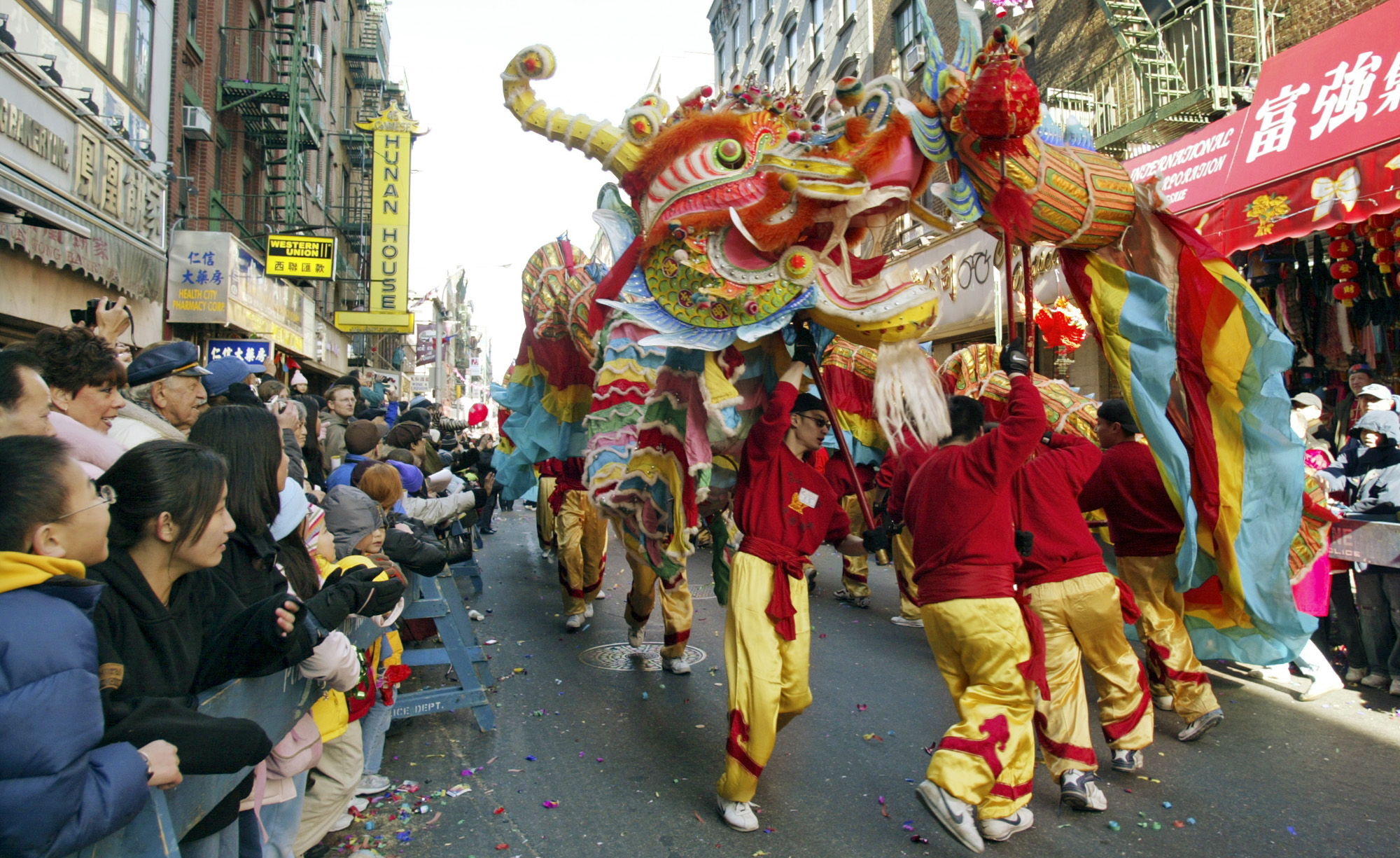
Chinatown in Manhattan, home to the largest population of Chinese people outside of Asia, with over 750,000 as of 2013.

Historical populations – modern New York MSA
Year	Pop.	±%
1830	552,237	—
1840	740,120	+34.0%
1850	1,142,304	+54.3%
1860	1,801,668	+57.7%
1870	2,319,319	+28.7%
1880	2,951,270	+27.2%
1890	3,845,151	+30.3%
1900	5,231,748	+36.1%
1910	7,248,147	+38.5%
1920	8,693,184	+19.9%
1930	11,123,506	+28.0%
1940	11,950,188	+7.4%
1950	13,299,834	+11.3%
1960	15,346,313	+15.4%
1970	17,065,328	+11.2%
1980	16,363,636	−4.1%
1990	16,846,046	+2.9%
2000	18,323,006	+8.8%
2010	18,897,109	+3.1%
2020	20,140,470	+6.6%
2024 est.	19,940,274	−1.0%
Note: figures up to 2020 include Pike County, PA. Estimates after 2020 do not include Pike County, which was detached from the MSA in September 2023. U.S. Decennial Census; 1900–1990

=== 2020 census ===
County	2020 census	2010 census	Change	Area	Density
Bronx County, New York	1,472,653	1,385,108	+6.32%	42.2 sq mi (109 km^{2})	34,897/sq mi (13,474/km^{2})
Kings County, New York	2,736,119	2,504,700	+9.24%	69.4 sq mi (180 km^{2})	39,425/sq mi (15,222/km^{2})
Nassau County, New York	1,395,767	1,339,532	+4.20%	284.5 sq mi (737 km^{2})	4,906/sq mi (1,894/km^{2})
New York County, New York	1,694,250	1,585,873	+6.83%	22.7 sq mi (59 km^{2})	74,637/sq mi (28,817/km^{2})
Putnam County, New York	97,678	99,710	−2.04%	230.3 sq mi (596 km^{2})	424/sq mi (164/km^{2})
Queens County, New York	2,405,425	2,230,722	+7.83%	108.7 sq mi (282 km^{2})	22,129/sq mi (8,544/km^{2})
Richmond County, New York	495,752	468,730	+5.76%	57.5 sq mi (149 km^{2})	8,622/sq mi (3,329/km^{2})
Rockland County, New York	338,337	311,687	+8.55%	173.7 sq mi (450 km^{2})	1,948/sq mi (752/km^{2})
Suffolk County, New York	1,525,894	1,493,350	+2.18%	910.9 sq mi (2,359 km^{2})	1,675/sq mi (647/km^{2})
Westchester County, New York	1,004,469	949,113	+5.83%	430.8 sq mi (1,116 km^{2})	2,332/sq mi (900/km^{2})
Bergen County, New Jersey	955,743	905,116	+5.59%	232.8 sq mi (603 km^{2})	4,105/sq mi (1,585/km^{2})
Essex County, New Jersey	862,768	783,969	+10.05%	126.1 sq mi (327 km^{2})	6,842/sq mi (2,642/km^{2})
Hudson County, New Jersey	724,858	634,266	+14.28%	46.2 sq mi (120 km^{2})	15,690/sq mi (6,058/km^{2})
Hunterdon County, New Jersey	128,950	128,349	+0.47%	427.8 sq mi (1,108 km^{2})	301/sq mi (116/km^{2})
Middlesex County, New Jersey	863,202	809,858	+6.59%	309.2 sq mi (801 km^{2})	2,792/sq mi (1,078/km^{2})
Monmouth County, New Jersey	643,612	630,380	+2.10%	468.2 sq mi (1,213 km^{2})	1,375/sq mi (531/km^{2})
Morris County, New Jersey	509,288	492,276	+3.46%	461.0 sq mi (1,194 km^{2})	1,105/sq mi (427/km^{2})
Ocean County, New Jersey	637,235	576,567	+10.52%	628.3 sq mi (1,627 km^{2})	1,014/sq mi (392/km^{2})
Passaic County, New Jersey	525,054	501,226	+4.75%	186.1 sq mi (482 km^{2})	2,821/sq mi (1,089/km^{2})
Somerset County, New Jersey	345,353	323,444	+6.77%	301.9 sq mi (782 km^{2})	1,144/sq mi (442/km^{2})
Sussex County, New Jersey	144,220	149,265	−3.38%	518.5 sq mi (1,343 km^{2})	278/sq mi (107/km^{2})
Union County, New Jersey	575,363	536,499	+7.24%	102.8 sq mi (266 km^{2})	5,597/sq mi (2,161/km^{2})
Total (New York-Newark-Jersey City MSA)	20,081,967	18,838,926	+6.60%	6,139.58 sq mi (15,901.4 km^{2})	3,271/sq mi (1,263/km^{2})

=== 2010 census ===
Racial composition	2010
White	73.4%
—Non-Hispanic White	51.7%
—Hispanic or Latino (of any race)	21.7%
Black or African-American	15.3%
Asian	9%
Native American or Alaskan Native	0.2%
Other	0.5%
Two or more races	1.6%

As of the 2010 Census, the metropolitan area had a population of 22,085,649. The population density was 1,865 per square mile. The racial markup was 51.7% White (non-Latino), 21.7% Latino, 15.3% African-American, 9.0% Asian-American, 0.16% Native American and Alaskan Native, 0.03% Pacific Islands American, 0.5% Other, and 1.6% Multiracial. The median age was 37.9. 25.5% were under 18, 9.5% were 18 to 24 years, 28% were 25 to 44 years of age, 26.6% were 45 to 64 years old, and 13.2% were over the age of 65. Males composed 48.3% of the population while females were 51.7% of the population.

Approximately 97.7% of the population were in households, 2.3% were in group quarters, and 1% were institutionalized. There were 8,103,731 households, of which 30.2% or 2,449,343 had children. 46.1% or 3,736,165 were composed of opposite sex and married couples. Male households with no wife composed 4.9% or 400,534. 15.0% or 1,212,436 were female households with no husbands. 34% or 2,754,596 were non-family households. The household density was 684 per square mile. 91.9% of housing units were occupied with a 3.8% vacancy rate. The average household size was 2.65 per household. The average income for non-family households was $90,335, and the average income for families was $104,715. 13.3% or 2,888,493 of the population were below the poverty line.

Also as of 2010, 26.7% or 5,911,993 of the population were born outside the United States. Out of this, most (50.6% or 2,992,639) were born in Latin America, 27.0% or 1,595,523 were born in Asia, 17.4% or 1,028,506 were born in Europe, 3.8% or 224,109 were born in Africa, and 0.2% or 11,957 were born in Oceania.

=== Population ===
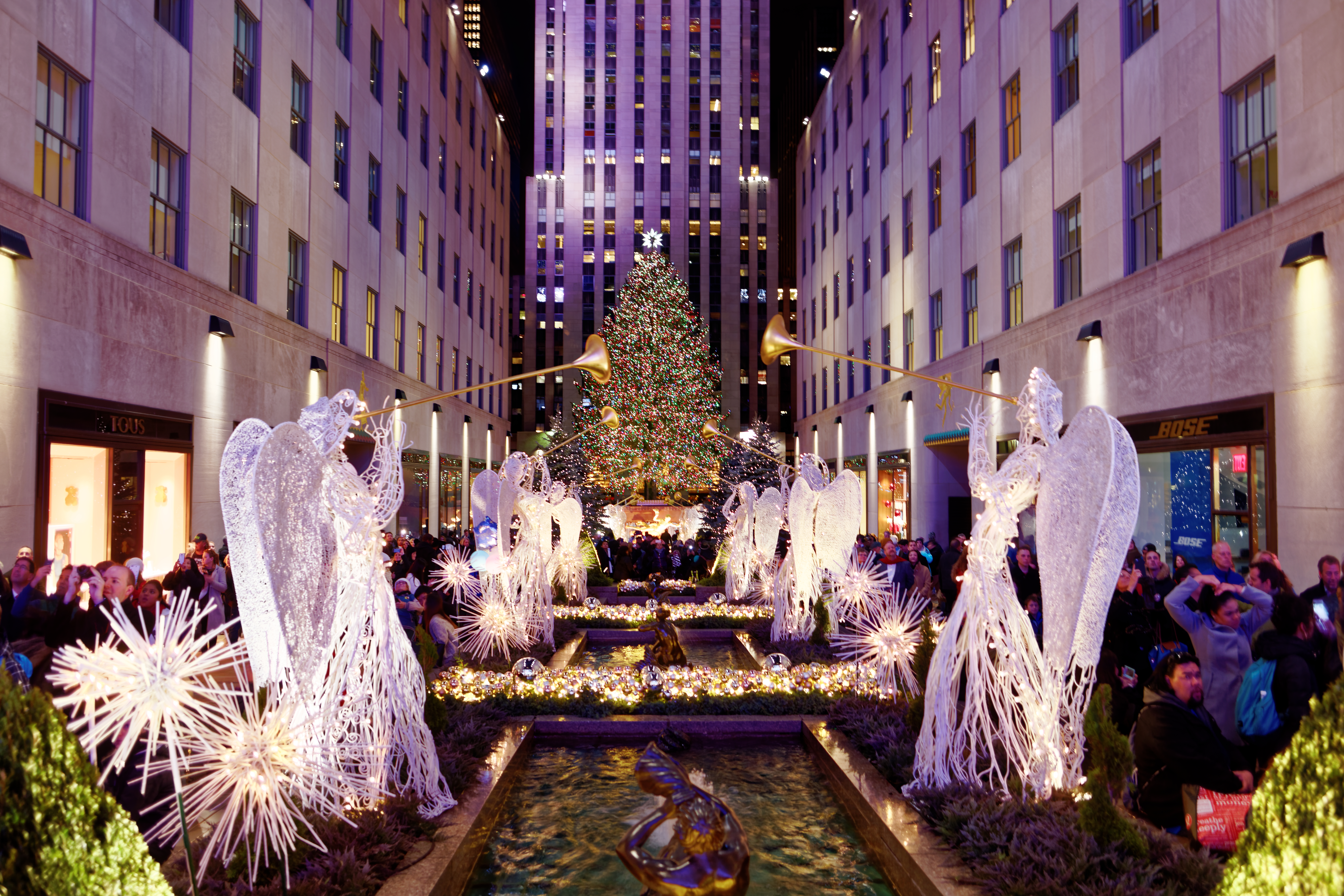
The Rockefeller Center Christmas Tree, considered the "worldwide symbol of Christmas", is an annual Holiday season staple for the New York metropolitan area.

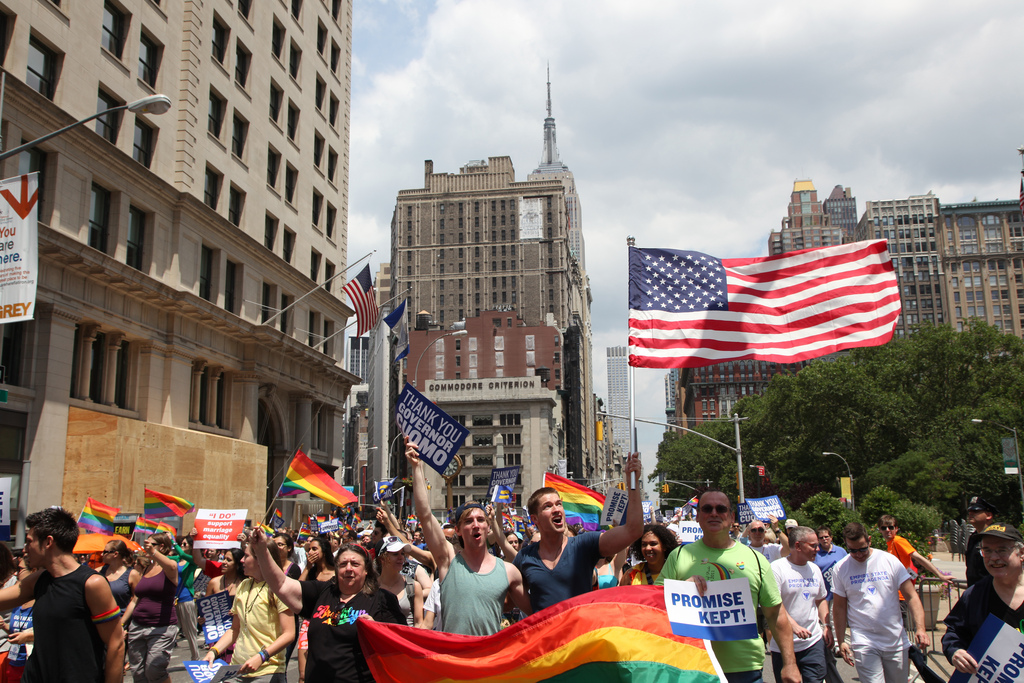
The New York metropolitan area is home to the largest gay and bisexual community in the United States and one of the world's largest.

As of 2020, the United States Census Bureau estimated the population of the New York combined statistical area at 23,582,649, the most populous in the United States and one of the world's most populous urban agglomerations. The increase in the population of the combined statistical area was distributed across the portions of the states of New York, New Jersey, Connecticut, and Pennsylvania which together constitute the greater New York City metropolitan area.

The New York metropolitan region is ethnically diverse. Asians in New York City, according to the 2010 Census, number more than one million, greater than the combined totals of San Francisco and Los Angeles, New York contains the highest total Asian population of any U.S. city proper, and the New York metropolitan area is home to the largest Asian population outside Asia, at 2.6 million. The New York borough of Queens is home to the state's largest Asian American population and the largest Andean (Colombian, Ecuadorian, Peruvian, Chilean and Bolivian) populations in the United States, and is also the most ethnically diverse urban area in the world. The Han Chinese population constitutes the fastest-growing ethnicity in New York State; multiple satellites of the original Manhattan Chinatown (紐約華埠), in Brooklyn (布鲁克林華埠), and around Flushing, Queens (法拉盛華埠), are thriving as traditionally urban enclaves, while also expanding rapidly eastward into suburban Nassau County. on Long Island, as the New York metropolitan region and New York State have become the top destinations for new Chinese immigrants, respectively, and large-scale Chinese immigration continues into New York City and surrounding areas.

In 2012, 6.3% of New York was of Chinese ethnicity, with nearly three-fourths living in either Queens or Brooklyn, geographically on Long Island. In particular, the New York area has over 100,000 Fuzhounese people. A community numbering 20,000 Korean-Chinese (Chaoxianzu (Chinese: 朝鲜族) or Joseonjok (Korean: 조선족)) is centered in Flushing, Queens, while New York is also home to the largest Tibetan population outside China, India, and Nepal, also centered in Queens. Koreans made up 1.2% of the city's population, and Japanese 0.3%. Filipinos were the largest Southeast Asian ethnic group at 0.8%, followed by Vietnamese, who made up 0.2% of New York's population in 2010. Indians are the largest South Asian group, accounting for 2.4% of the city's population, with Bangladeshis and Pakistanis at 0.7% and 0.5%, respectively. Queens is the preferred borough of settlement for Asian Indians, Koreans, and Filipinos, as well as Malaysians and other Southeast Asians; while Brooklyn is receiving large numbers of both West Indian as well as Asian Indian immigrants.

New York has the largest European and non-Hispanic white population of any American city. At 2.7 million in 2012, New York's non-Hispanic white population is larger than the non-Hispanic white populations of Los Angeles (1.1 million), Chicago (865,000), and Houston (550,000) combined. The European diaspora residing in the city is very diverse. According to 2012 Census estimates, there were roughly 560,000 Italian Americans, 385,000 Irish Americans, 253,000 German Americans, 223,000 Russian Americans, 201,000 Polish Americans, and 137,000 English Americans. Additionally, Greek and French Americans numbered 65,000 each, with those of Hungarian descent estimated at 60,000 people. Ukrainian and Scottish Americans numbered 55,000 and 35,000, respectively. People identifying ancestry from Spain numbered 30,838 total in 2010. People of Norwegian and Swedish descent both stood at about 20,000 each, while people of Czech, Lithuanian, Portuguese, Scotch-Irish, and Welsh descent all numbered between 12,000 and 14,000 people. Arab Americans number over 160,000 in New York City, with the highest concentration in Brooklyn. Central Asians, primarily Uzbek Americans, are a rapidly growing segment of the city's non-Hispanic white population, enumerating over 30,000, and including over half of all Central Asian immigrants to the United States, most settling in Queens or Brooklyn. Albanian Americans are most highly concentrated in the Bronx.

The wider New York metropolitan area is also ethnically diverse. The New York metropolitan area is home the largest African American/Black population in the nation with nearly four million. The New York region continues to be by far the leading metropolitan gateway for legal immigrants admitted into the United States, substantially exceeding the combined totals of Los Angeles and Miami, the next most popular gateway regions. It is home to the largest Jewish as well as Israeli communities outside Israel, with the Jewish population in the region numbering over 1.5 million in 2012 and including many diverse Jewish sects from around the Middle East and Eastern Europe. The metropolitan area is also home to 20% of the nation's Indian Americans and at least 20 Little India enclaves, as well as 15% of all Korean Americans and four Koreatowns; the largest Asian Indian population in the Western Hemisphere; the largest Russian American, Italian American, and African American populations; the largest Dominican American, Puerto Rican American, and South American and second-largest overall Hispanic population in the United States, numbering 4.8 million; and includes at least 6 established Chinatowns within New York City alone, with the urban agglomeration consisting of a population of 819,527 uniracial overseas Chinese as of 2014 Census estimates, the largest outside of Asia.

Ecuador, Colombia, Guyana, Peru, and Brazil were the top source countries from South America for legal immigrants to the New York region in 2013; the Dominican Republic, Jamaica, Haiti, and Trinidad and Tobago in the Caribbean; and El Salvador, Honduras, and Guatemala in Central America. Amidst a resurgence of Puerto Rican migration to New York City, this population had increased to approximately 1.3 million in the metropolitan area as of 2013.

New York City has been described as the gay capital of the world, and is home to one of the world's largest LGBTQ populations and the most prominent. The New York metropolitan area is home to a self-identifying gay and bisexual community estimated at 568,903 individuals, three world's largest. Same-sex marriages in New York were legalized on June 24, 2011, and were authorized to take place beginning 30 days thereafter. The annual NYC Pride March (or Gay Pride Parade) traverses southward down Fifth Avenue in Manhattan, ending at Greenwich Village, and is the largest pride parade in the world, attracting tens of thousands of participants and millions of sidewalk spectators each June.

=== Religion ===
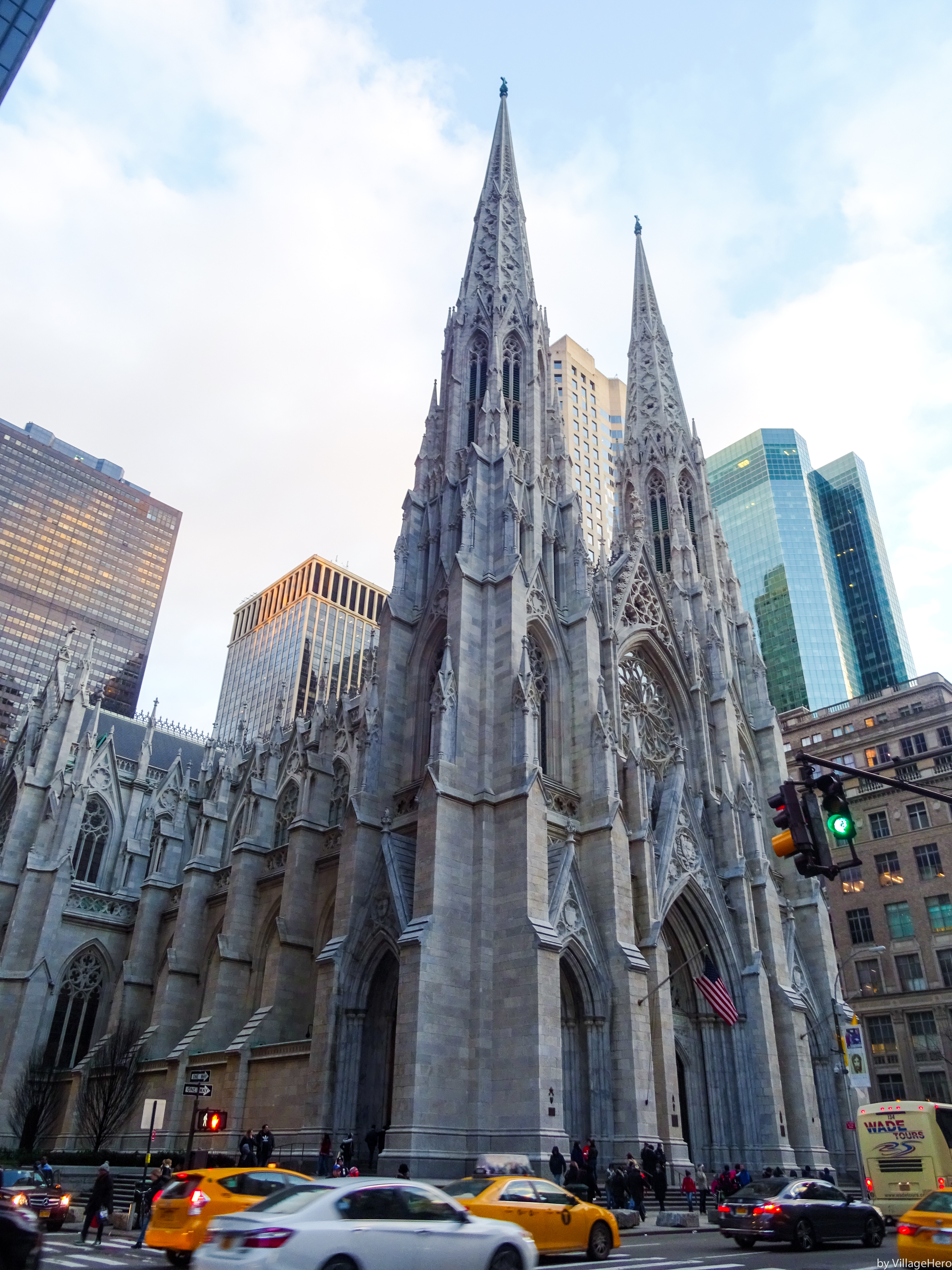
The landmark Neo-Gothic Roman Catholic St. Patrick's Cathedral, Midtown Manhattan.

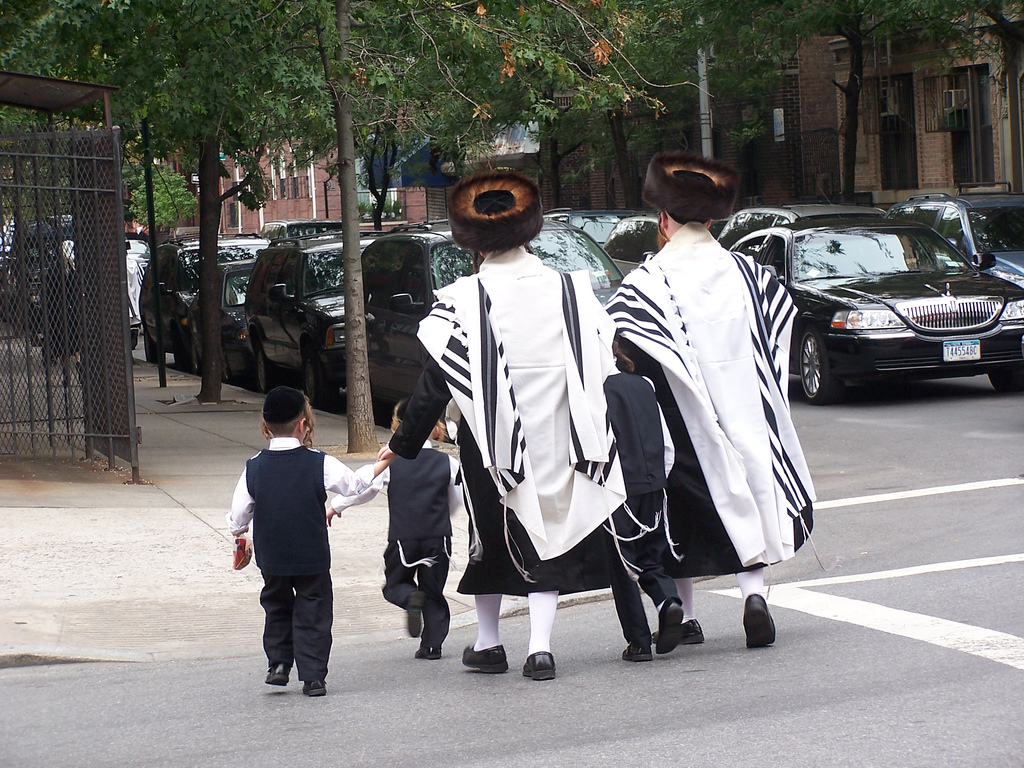
Of Brooklyn's 2.4 million residents, 561,000 - or 23% - are Jewish as of 2011.

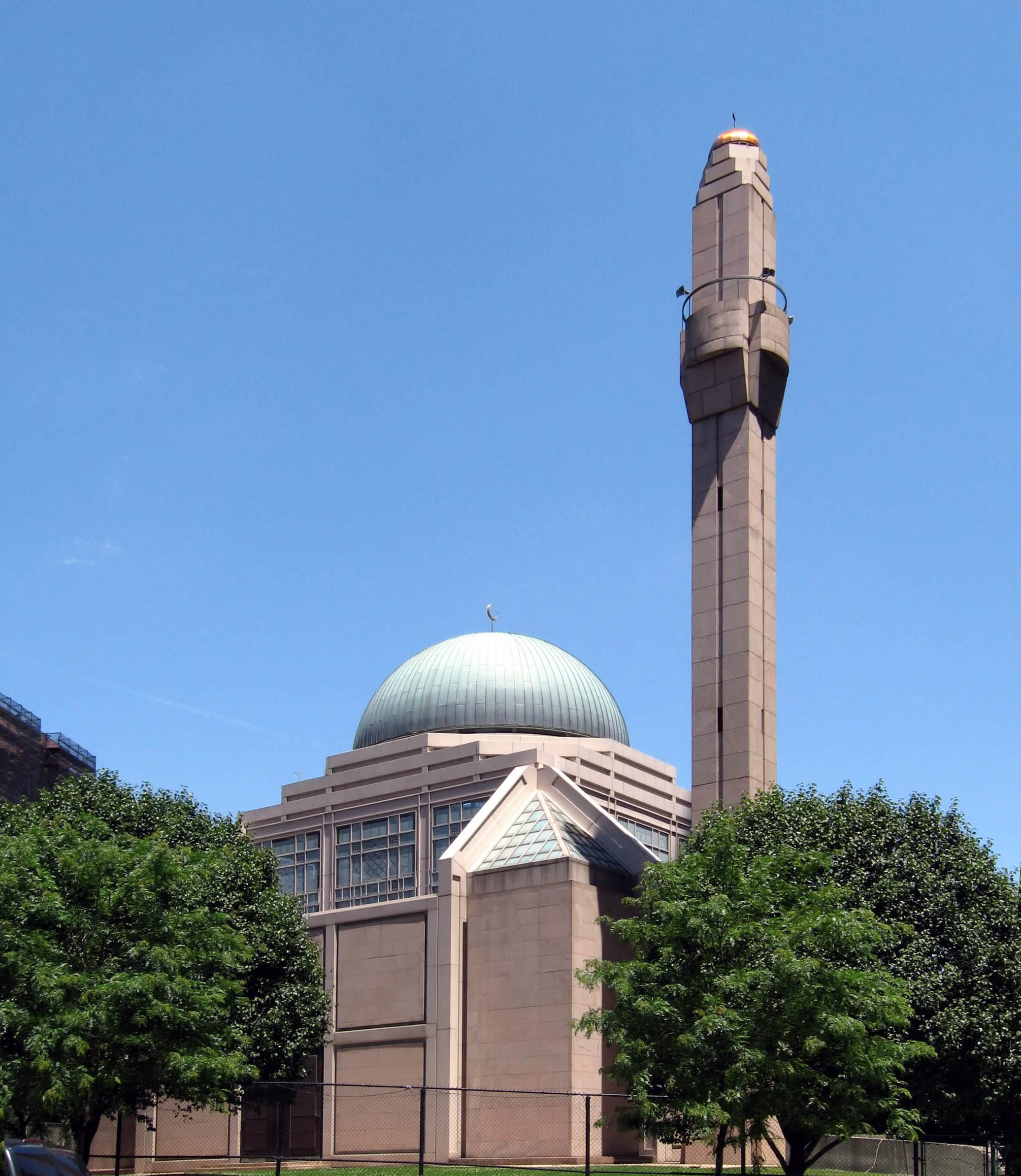
The Islamic Cultural Center of New York (Arabic: المركز الثقافي الإسلامي في نيويورك) in Upper Manhattan. With an estimated 1.5 million observers, the New York metropolitan area is home to the largest metropolitan Muslim population in the Western Hemisphere.

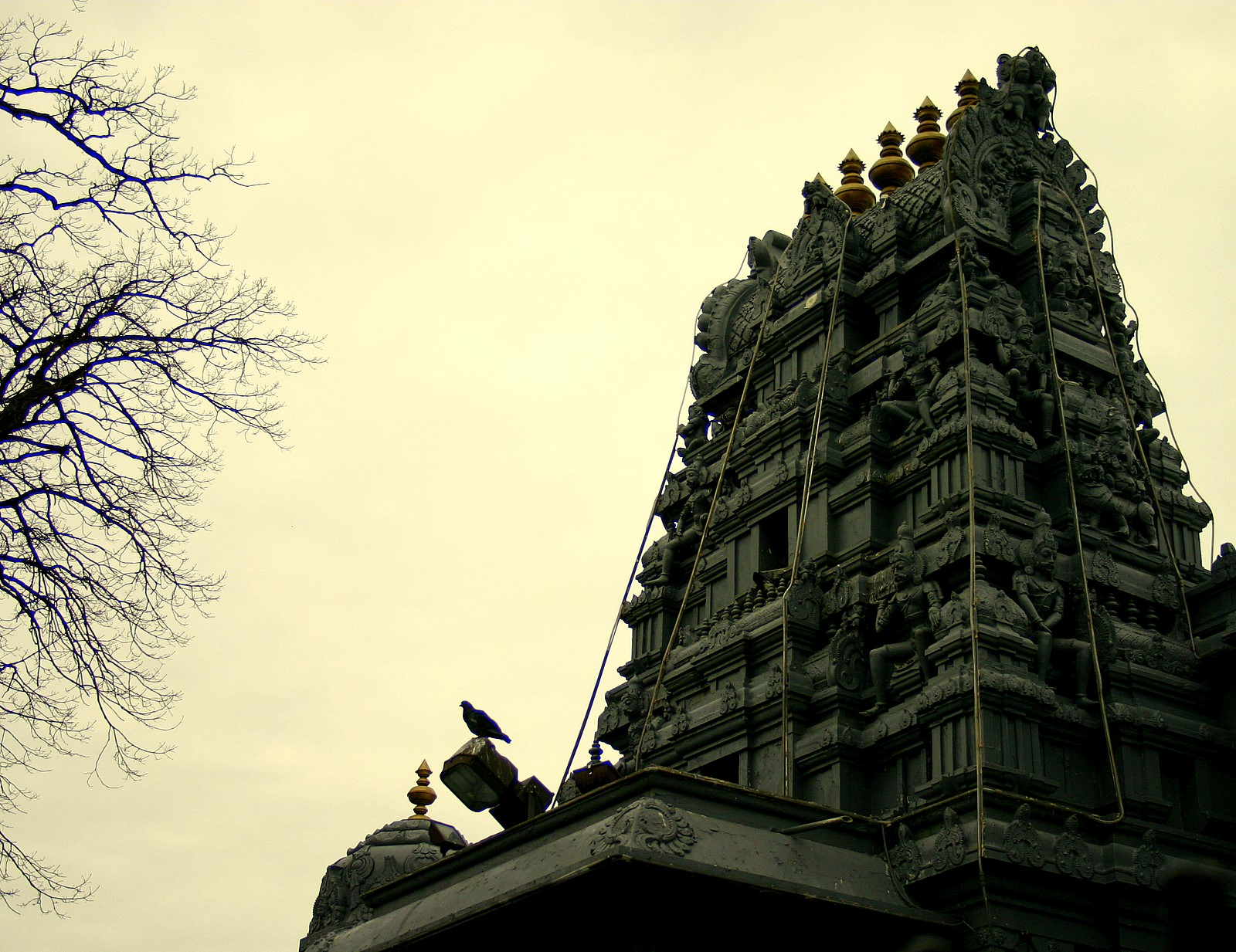
Sri Maha Vallabha Ganapati Devasthanam (Kannada: ಶ್ರೀ ಮಹಾವಲ್ಲಭ ಗಣಪತಿ ದೇವಸ್ಥಾನ) or (Tamil: ஸ்ரீ மகா வல்லப கணபதி தேவஸ்தானம்), in Flushing, Queens, the oldest Hindu temple in the United States.

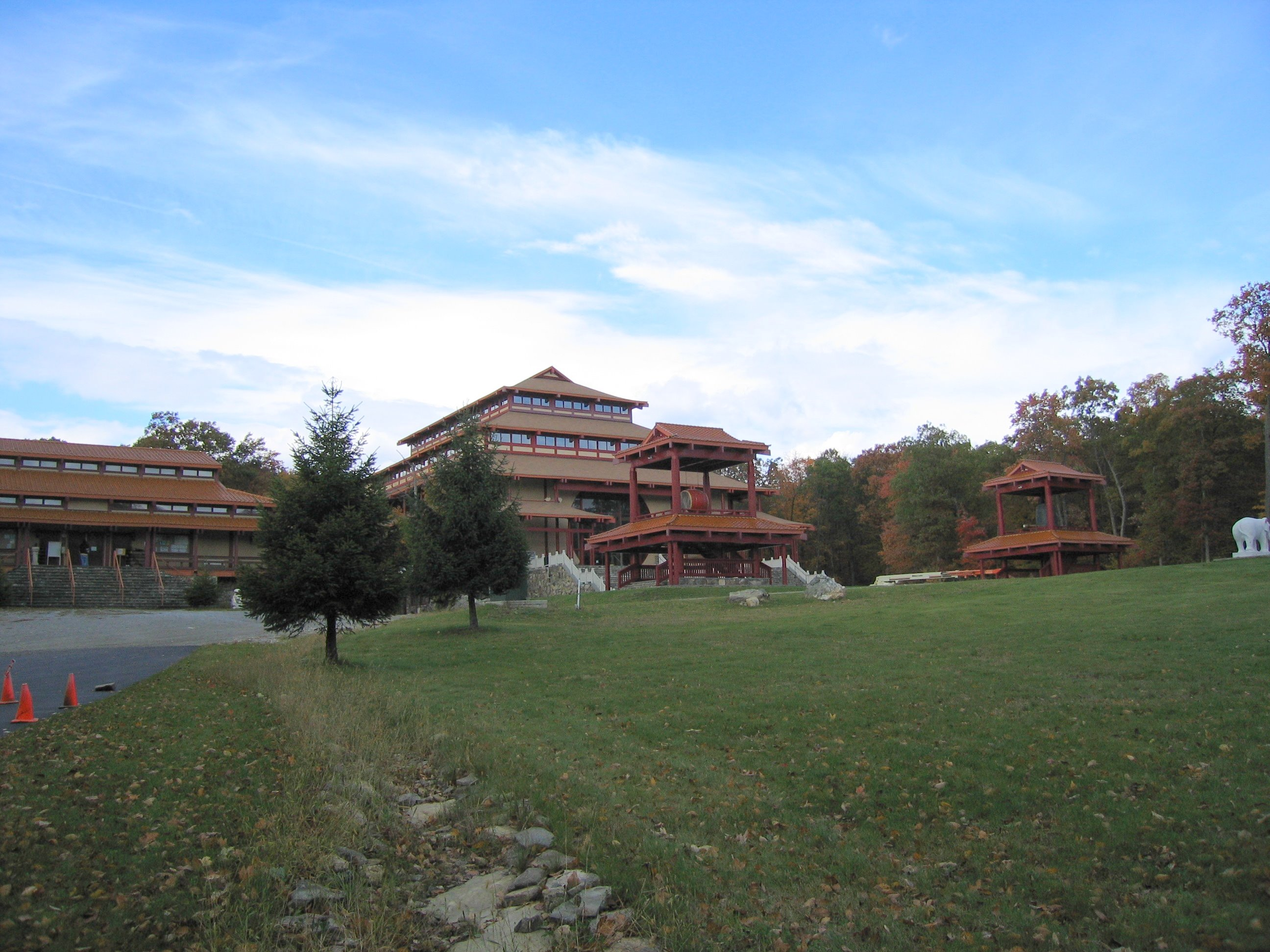
The Chuang Yen Monastery (莊嚴寺), in Kent, Putnam County, houses the largest indoor statue of Buddha in the Western Hemisphere.

The 2014 Pew Religious Landscape Survey showed that the religious makeup of the New York metro area was as follows:

Religious affiliation in the New York City metro area (2014)
Affiliation	% of New York population
Christian	59
Catholic	33
Protestant	23
Evangelical Protestant	9
Mainline Protestant	8
Black church	6
Other Christian	3
Unaffiliated	24
Nothing in particular	15
Agnostic	4
Atheist	4
Jewish	8
Muslim	4
Hindu	2
Buddhist	1
Other faiths	1
Don't know/refused answer	1
Total	100

== Economy ==
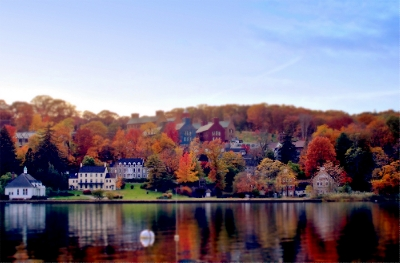
Cold Spring Harbor Laboratory on the North Shore of Long Island, an internationally renowned biomedical research facility and home to eight scientists awarded the Nobel Prize in Physiology or Medicine

The New York City regional economy is the largest in the world, with a GDP of US$2.5 trillion in 2022, which would rank 8th among sovereign countries. Many Fortune 500 corporations are headquartered in New York, as are a large number of foreign corporations. One out of ten private sector jobs in the city is with a foreign company. In 2012 and 2015, New York topped the first and second Global Economic Power Index lists, respectively, as published by The Atlantic, with cities ranked according to criteria reflecting their presence on five different lists as published by five separate entities. Finance, international trade, new and traditional media, real estate, education, fashion and entertainment, tourism, biotechnology, and manufacturing are the leading industries in the area. Along with its wealth, the area has a cost of living that is the highest in the United States.

=== Gross domestic product by county ===
Rank (2022)	County	GDP by county (million US$)
1	New York	885,651.810
2	Kings	125,866.867
3	Suffolk	125,184.540
4	Queens	122,288.187
5	Nassau	121,290.784
6	Fairfield	104,368.153
7	Westchester	103,162.225
8	Bergen	95,627.951
9	Middlesex	78,784.425
10	Morris	69,014.834
11	Essex	67,415.140
12	New Haven	61,456.416
13	Hudson	59,260.996
14	Bronx	51,573.982
15	Mercer	49,620.483
16	Somerset	48,293.447
17	Monmouth	46,342.232
18	Union	45,128.578
19	Ocean	28,260.414
20	Passaic	25,843.403
21	Orange	25,001.648
22	Rockland	22,031.406
23	Richmond	21,103.447
24	Dutchess	17,859.624
25	Litchfield	10,737.359
26	Ulster	9,052.826
27	Hunterdon	8,836.259
28	Sussex	5,900.635
29	Putnam	4,687.684
30	Pike	1,659.595
	New York-Newark, NY-NJ-CT-PA CSA	2,504,721.129

=== Wall Street ===
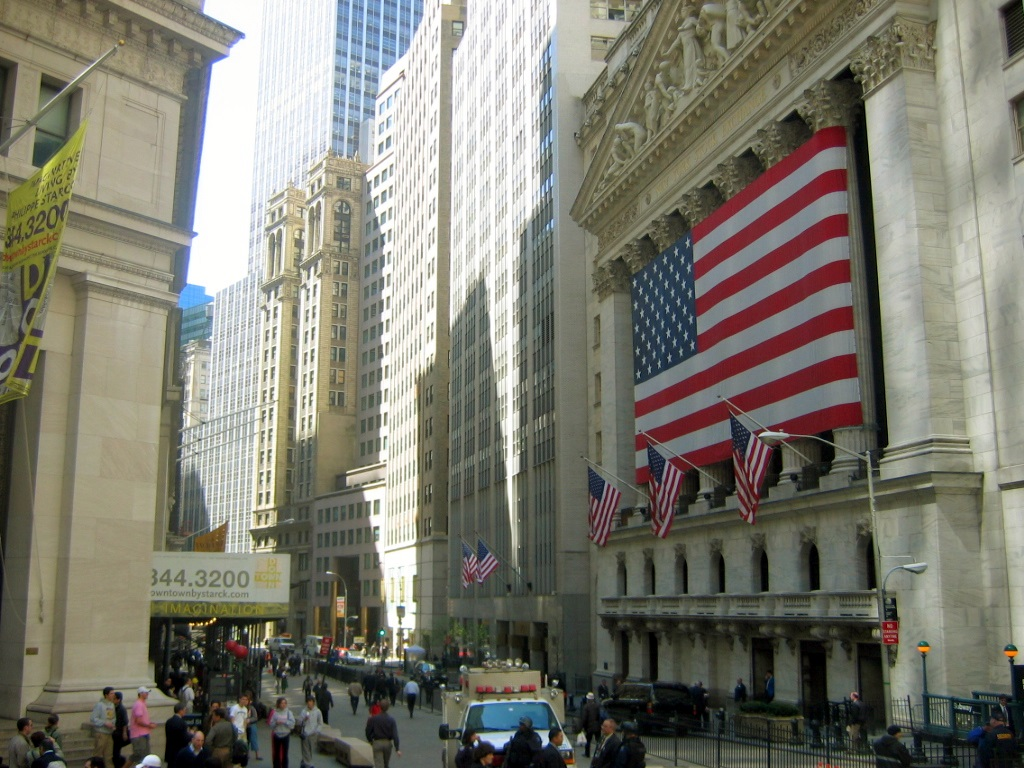
NYSE on Wall Street, the world's largest stock market by total market capitalization of listed companies.

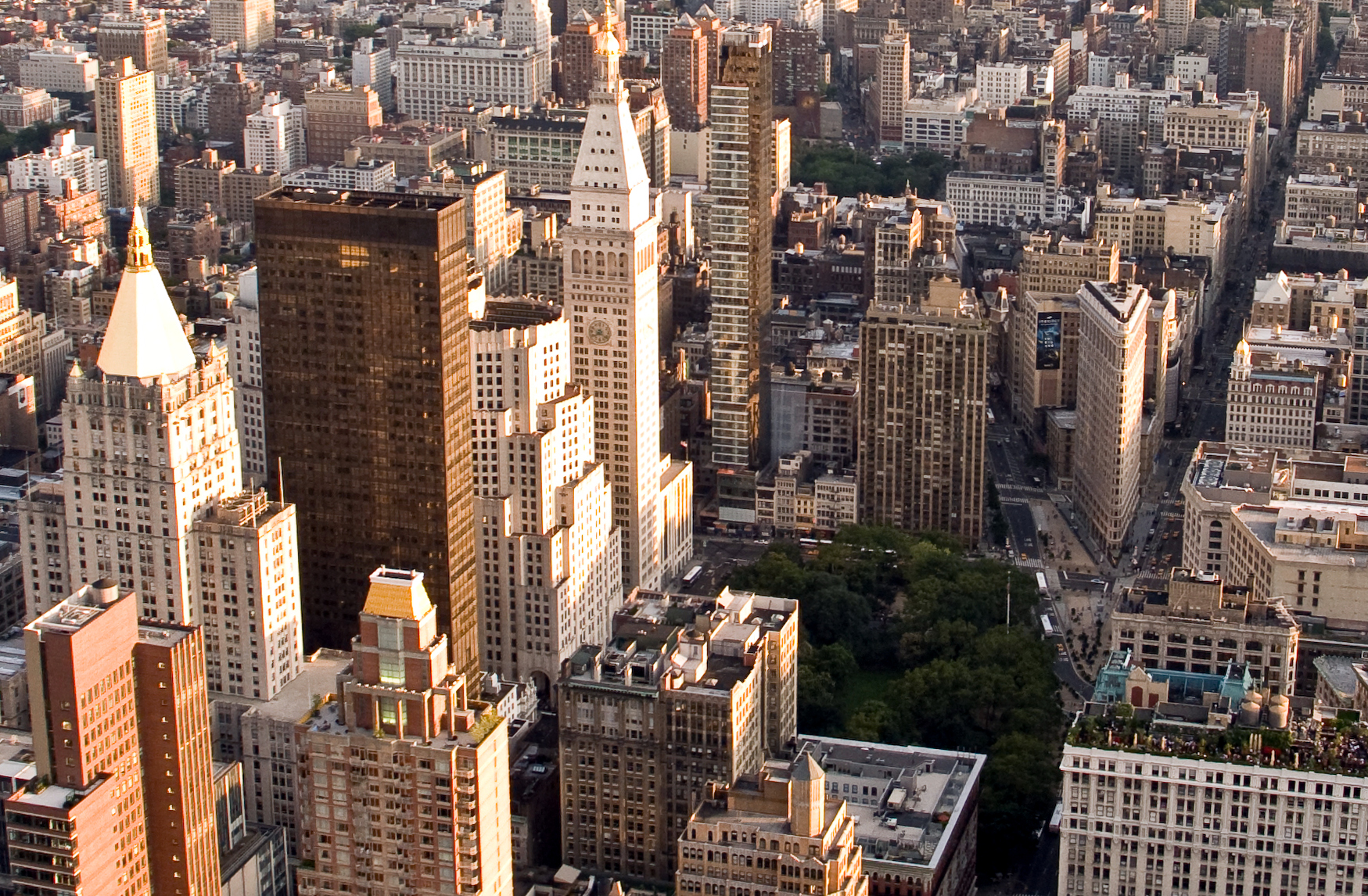
Manhattan's Flatiron District was the cradle of Silicon Alley, now metonymous for the New York metropolitan region's high tech sector, which has since expanded beyond the area.

The New York metropolitan area's most important economic sector lies in its role as the headquarters for the U.S. financial industry, metonymously known as Wall Street. Anchored by Wall Street, in the Financial District of Lower Manhattan, New York has been called both the most economically powerful city and the leading financial center of the world, and the city is home to the world's two largest stock exchanges by total market capitalization, the New York Stock Exchange and NASDAQ. The city's securities industry, enumerating 163,400 jobs in August 2013, continues to form the largest segment of the city's financial sector and an important economic engine, accounting in 2012 for 5 percent of the city's private sector jobs, 8.5 percent (US$3.8 billion) of its tax revenue, and 22 percent of the city's total wages, including an average salary of US$360,700.

Manhattan had approximately 520 million square feet (48.1 million m^{2}) of office space in 2013, making it the largest office market in the United States, while Midtown Manhattan is the largest central business district in the nation.

Lower Manhattan is the third-largest central business district in the United States and is home to both the New York Stock Exchange, on Wall Street, and the NASDAQ, at 165 Broadway, representing the world's largest and second largest stock exchanges, respectively, when measured both by overall average daily trading volume and by total market capitalization of their listed companies in 2013. Wall Street investment banking fees in 2012 totaled approximately US$40 billion, while in 2013, senior New York bank officers who manage risk and compliance functions earned as much as US$324,000 annually.

In July 2013, NYSE Euronext, the operator of the New York Stock Exchange, took over the administration of the London interbank offered rate from the British Bankers Association.

Many Wall Street firms have added or moved auxiliary financial or technical operations into Jersey City, to take advantage of New Jersey's relatively lower commercial real estate and rental prices, while offering continued geographic proximity to Manhattan's financial industry ecosystem.

=== Tech and biotech ===
Silicon Alley, centered in New York, has evolved into a metonym for the sphere encompassing the metropolitan region's high technology industries involving the internet, new media, financial technology (fintech) and cryptocurrency, telecommunications, digital media, software development, biotechnology, game design, and other fields within information technology that are supported by its entrepreneurship ecosystem and venture capital investments. High technology startup companies and employment are growing in New York and across the metropolitan region, bolstered by the city's emergence as a global node of creativity and entrepreneurship, social tolerance, and environmental sustainability, as well as New York's position as the leading Internet hub and telecommunications center in North America, including its vicinity to several transatlantic fiber optic trunk lines, the city's intellectual capital, and its extensive outdoor wireless connectivity. Verizon Communications, headquartered at 140 West Street in Lower Manhattan, was at the final stages in 2014 of completing a US$3 billion fiberoptic telecommunications upgrade throughout New York City.

The biotechnology sector is also growing in the New York metropolitan region, based upon its strength in academic scientific research and public and commercial financial support. On December 19, 2011, then-New York mayor Michael Bloomberg announced his choice of Cornell University and Technion-Israel Institute of Technology to build Cornell Tech, a US$2 billion graduate school of applied sciences on Roosevelt Island, Manhattan with the goal of transforming New York into the world's premier technology capital. By mid-2014, Accelerator, a biotech investment firm, had raised more than US$30 million from investors, including Eli Lilly and Company, Pfizer, and Johnson & Johnson, for initial funding to create biotechnology startups at the Alexandria Center for Life Science, which encompasses more than 700,000 square feet (65,000 m^{2}) on East 29th Street and promotes collaboration among scientists and entrepreneurs at the center and with nearby academic, medical, and research institutions. The New York City Economic Development Corporation's Early Stage Life Sciences Funding Initiative and venture capital partners, including Celgene, General Electric Ventures, and Eli Lilly, committed a minimum of US$100 million to help launch 15 to 20 ventures in life sciences and biotechnology. Westchester County has also developed a burgeoning biotechnology sector in the 21st century, with over US$1 billion in planned private investment as of 2016, earning the county the nickname Biochester.

=== Port of New York and New Jersey ===
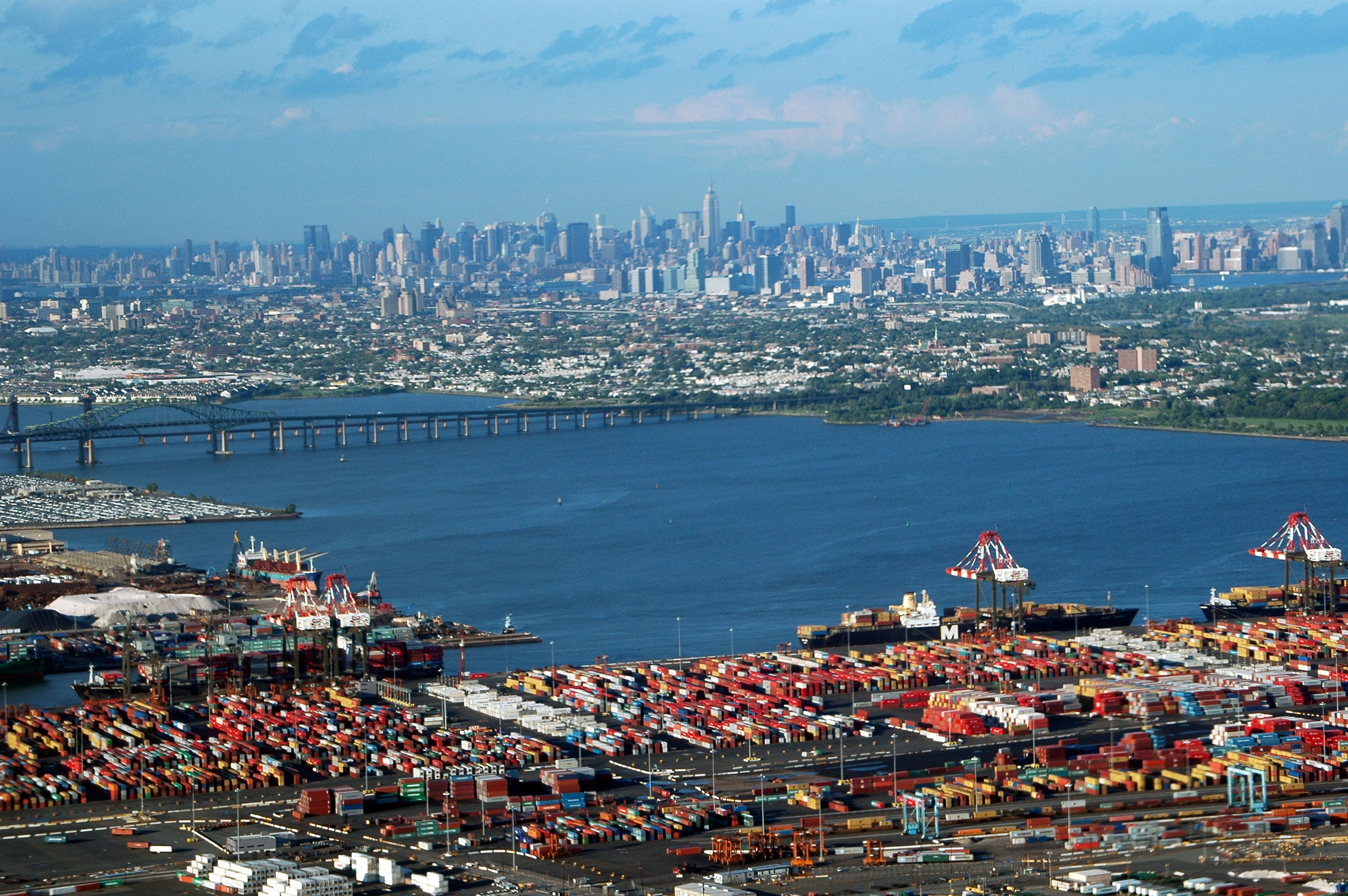
Port Newark–Elizabeth Marine Terminal on Newark Bay is the busiest container terminal on the East Coast of the United States.

The Port of New York and New Jersey is the port district of the New York metropolitan area, encompassing the region within approximately a 25-mile (40 km) radius of the Statue of Liberty National Monument. A major economic engine for the New York metropolitan area, the port includes the system of navigable waterways in the estuary along 650 miles (1,050 km) of shoreline in the vicinity of New York and the Gateway Region of northeastern New Jersey, as well as the region's airports and supporting rail and roadway distribution networks. The Port of New York and New Jersey handled a maritime cargo volume in the ten months through October 2022 of over 8.2 million TEUs, benefitting post-Panamax from the expansion of the Panama Canal, and accelerating ahead of California seaports in monthly cargo volumes.

=== Water purity and availability ===
Water purity and availability are a lifeline for the New York metropolitan region. New York City is supplied with drinking water by the protected Catskill Mountains watershed. As a result of the watershed's integrity and undisturbed natural water filtration system, New York is one of only four major cities in the United States the majority of whose drinking water is pure enough not to require purification by water treatment plants. The Croton Watershed north of the city is undergoing construction of a US$3.2 billion water purification plant to augment New York's water supply by an estimated 290 million gallons daily, representing a greater than 20% addition to the city's current availability of water. The ongoing expansion of New York City Water Tunnel No. 3, an integral part of the New York City water supply system, is the largest capital construction project in the city's history, with segments serving Manhattan and The Bronx completed, and with segments serving Brooklyn and Queens planned for construction in 2020. Much of the fresh water for northern and central New Jersey is provided by reservoirs, but numerous municipal water wells exist which accomplish the same purpose.

== Education ==
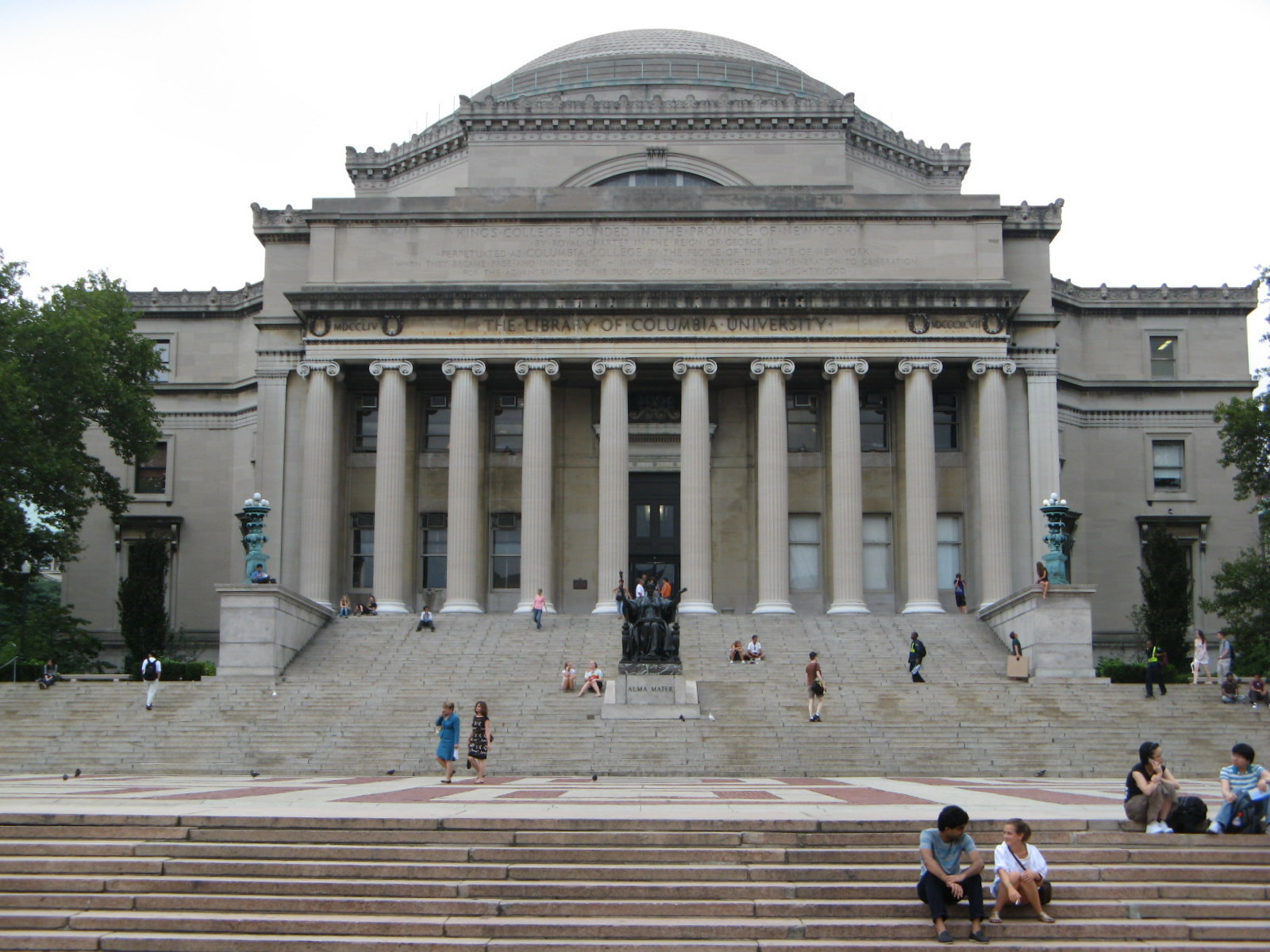
Low Library, the Neoclassical centerpiece of the Columbia University campus

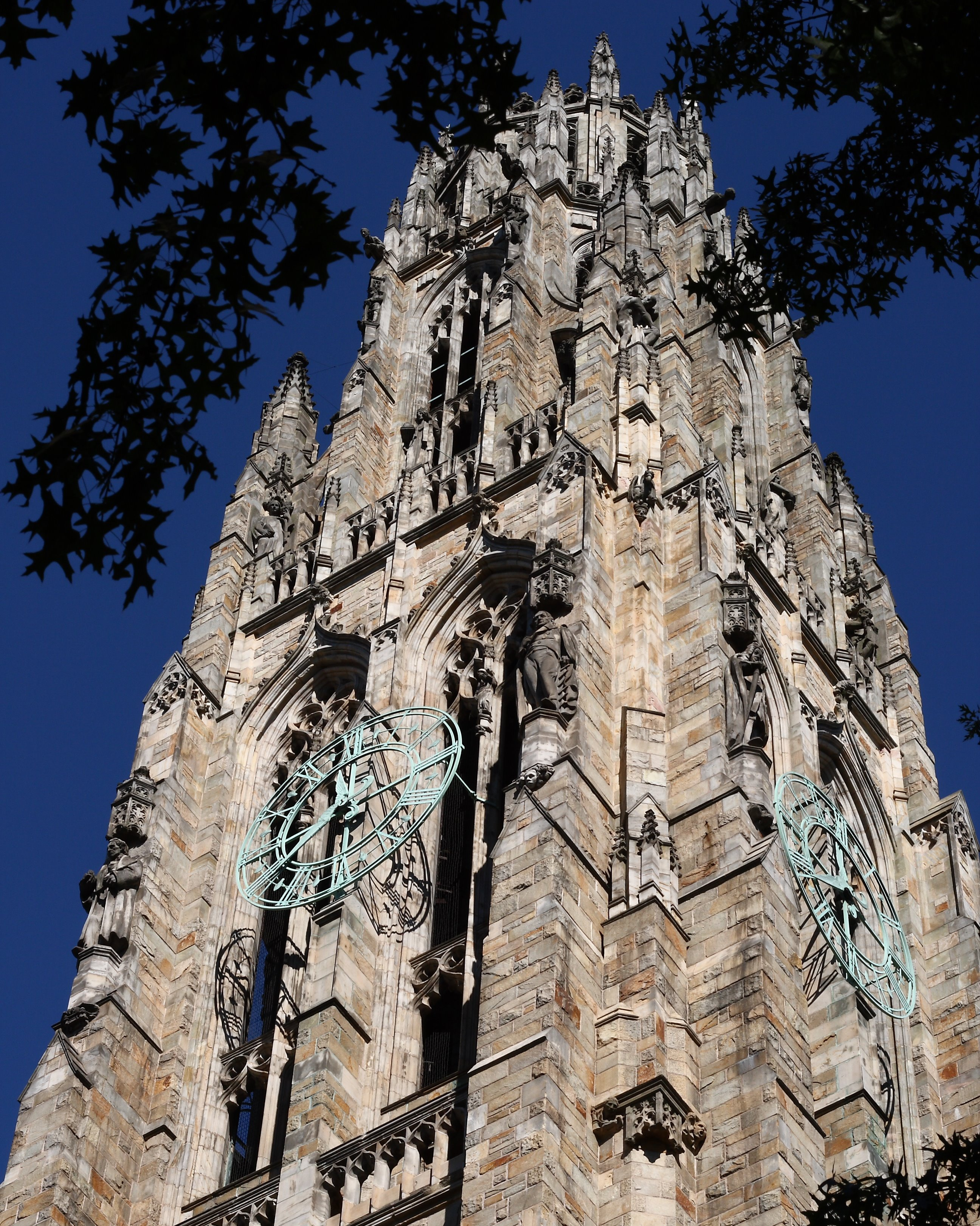
The bronze clock on Harkness Tower at Yale University, a structure reflecting the Collegiate Gothic architectural genre

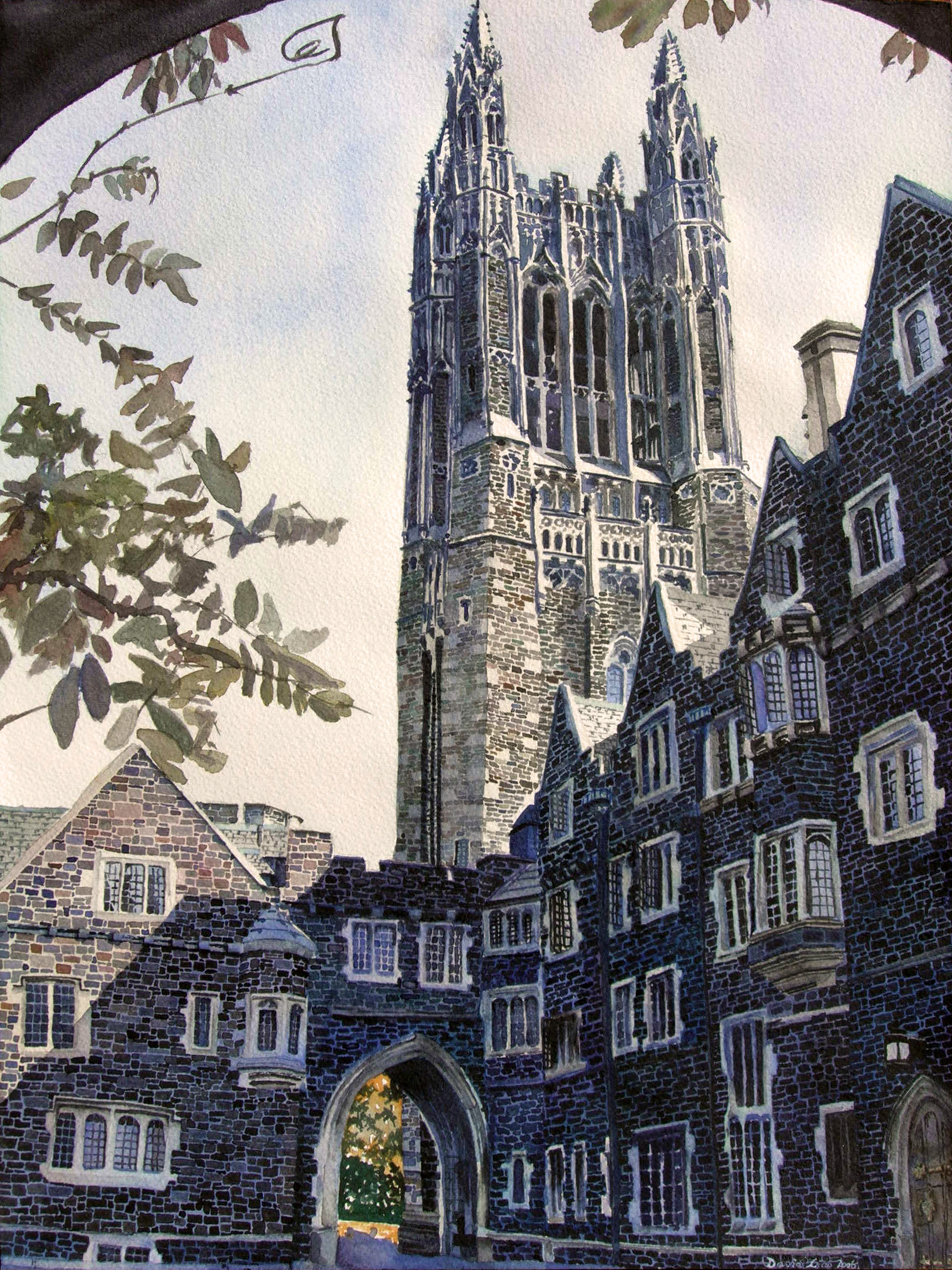
Watercolor of Cleveland Tower, Princeton University, seen in the noon autumn sun

The New York metropolitan area is home to many prestigious institutions of higher education. Three Ivy League universities: Columbia University in Manhattan, New York City; Princeton University in Princeton, New Jersey; Yale University in New Haven, Connecticut – all ranked amongst the top 3 U.S. national universities as per U.S. News & World Report as of 2018 – reside in the region, as well as New York University and The Rockefeller University, both located in Manhattan; all of the above have been ranked amongst the top 35 universities in the world. Rutgers University, a global university located 27 mi (43 km) southwest of Manhattan in New Brunswick and Piscataway, New Jersey, is by far the largest university in the region. New York Institute of Technology is located on two campuses, one in Old Westbury, Long Island and one near Columbus Circle in Manhattan. Hofstra University is Long Island's largest private university. Fordham University, also a Tier-1 university, is the oldest Catholic institution of higher education in the northeastern United States, and the third-oldest university in New York State. The New York City Department of Education is the largest school district in the United States serving over 1.2 million students. The overall region also hosts many public high schools, some of which have been described as among the most prestigious in the country.

=== Attainment ===
According to the 2010 American Community Survey, of the 14,973,063 persons in this area over 25 years of age, 14.8% (2,216,578) had a graduate or professional degree, 21.1% (3,166,037) had a bachelor's degree, 6.4% (962,007) had an associate degree, 16.0% (2,393,990) had some college education but no degree, 26.8% (4,009,901) had a high school diploma or equivalent, 14.8% (2,224,557) had less than a high school education. In 2010, CNN Money ranked the area as one of the top 10 smartest regions in the United States.

== Transportation ==
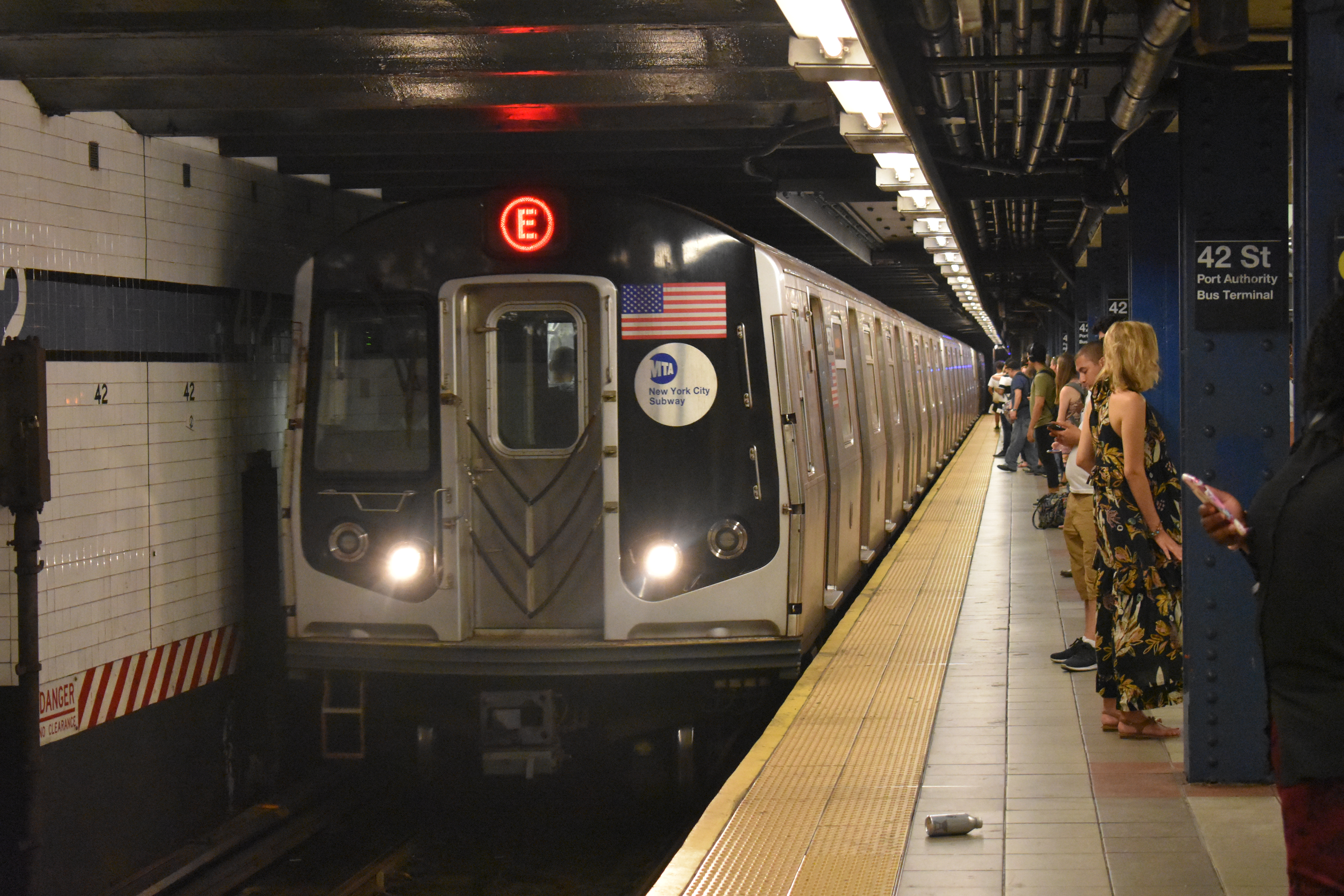
The New York City Subway is the world's largest rapid transit system by length of routes and by number of stations.

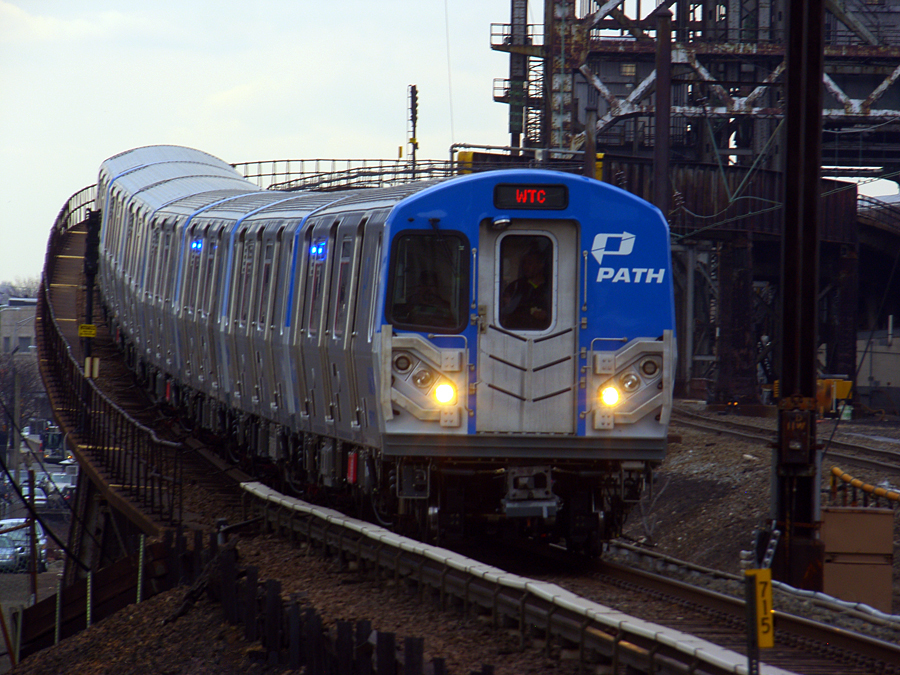
The Port Authority Trans-Hudson (PATH) rapid transit rail system connects Manhattan and metropolitan North Jersey beneath the Hudson River.

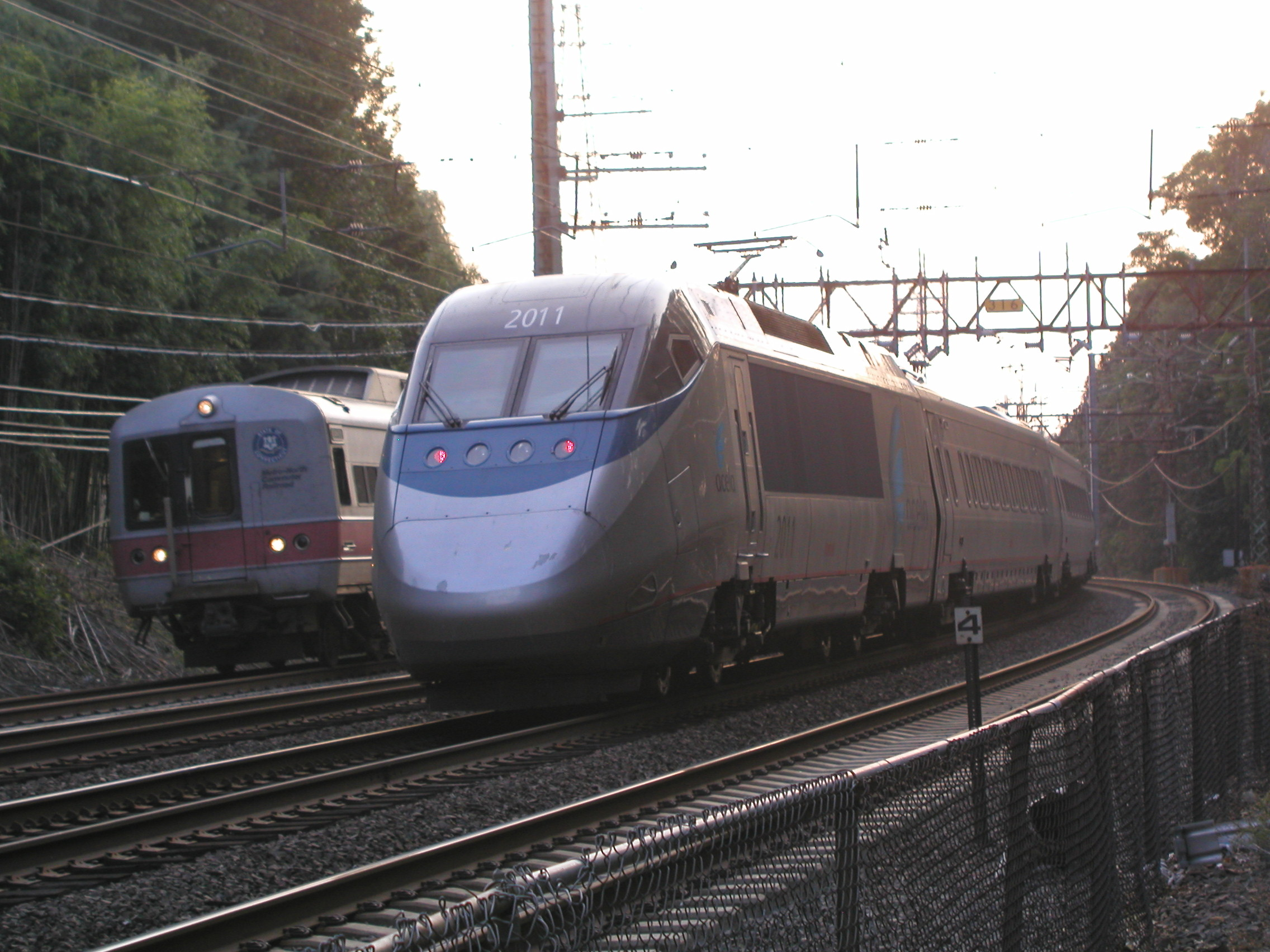
An Acela Express train going to New York. The Acela Express, operated by Amtrak through the Northeast Corridor, is the sole high-speed rail service in the country.

The depth and intricacy of the transportation network in the New York region parallels the size and complexity of the metropolis itself.

In 2013, the New York-Newark-Jersey City metropolitan statistical area (New York MSA) had the lowest percentage of workers who commuted by private automobile (56.9 percent), with 18.9 percent of area workers traveling via rail transit. During the period starting in 2006 and ending in 2013, the New York MSA had a 2.2 percent decline of workers commuting by automobile.

=== Rail ===
About one in every three users of mass transit in the United States and two-thirds of the nation's rail riders live in the New York metropolitan area.

==== New York City Subway ====
The New York City Subway is the largest rapid transit system in the world when measured by stations in operation, with 472, and by length of routes. In 2006 it was the third largest when measured by annual ridership (1.5 billion passenger trips in 2006), However, in 2013, the subway delivered over 1.71 billion rides, but slipped to being the seventh busiest rapid transit rail system in the world. New York's subway is also notable because nearly the entire system remains open 24 hours a day, in contrast to the overnight shutdown common to systems in most cities, including Hong Kong, London, Seoul, Tokyo, and Toronto.

==== PATH ====
PATH is a rapid transit system connecting the cities of Newark, Harrison, Hoboken, and Jersey City, in metropolitan northern New Jersey, with the Lower and Midtown sections of Manhattan in New York City. The PATH is operated by the Port Authority of New York and New Jersey. PATH trains run 24 hours a day and 7 days a week. The system has a total route length of 13.8 mi (22.2 km), not double-counting route overlaps.

==== Commuter rail ====
The metropolitan area is also fundamentally defined by the areas from which people commute into New York. The city is served by three primary commuter rail systems, and is provided intercity rail transit with Amtrak.

The Long Island Rail Road (LIRR), the busiest commuter railroad in the United States as of 2015, is operated by the Metropolitan Transportation Authority (MTA), an agency of the State Government of New York that focuses on New York City-area transit). It has two major terminals at Pennsylvania Station in Midtown Manhattan and Atlantic Terminal in Downtown Brooklyn, with a minor terminal at the Long Island City station and a major transfer point at the Jamaica station in Queens.

New Jersey Transit (NJT), the second busiest commuter railroad in the United States as of 2015, is operated by the New Jersey Transit Corporation, an agency of the state of New Jersey, in conjunction with Metro-North Railroad and Amtrak. It has major terminals at Pennsylvania Station in Manhattan, Hoboken Terminal, and Newark Pennsylvania Station, with a major transfer point at Secaucus Junction in Hudson County, New Jersey. New Jersey Transit also operates the Hudson–Bergen Light Rail through Hudson County, the Newark Light Rail, and the River Line that runs along tracks shared with Conrail Shared Assets Operations from Trenton to Camden in South Jersey. NJ Transit also has commuter buses operating in and out of Manhattan.

Metro-North Railroad (MNRR), the third busiest commuter railroad in the United States as of 2015, is also operated by the MTA, in conjunction with the Connecticut Department of Transportation and New Jersey Transit. Its major terminal is Grand Central Terminal. Trains on the Port Jervis Line and Pascack Valley Line terminate at Hoboken Terminal in Hoboken, New Jersey; commuters may transfer at either Secaucus Junction for New Jersey Transit trains to New York Pennsylvania Station or at Hoboken Terminal for PATH trains into Manhattan.

Amtrak's Northeast Corridor offers service to Philadelphia, New Haven, and other points between and including Boston and Washington, D.C.

Major stations in the metropolitan area include:

Station	Railroad(s)	State	County	Type
New York Pennsylvania Station	Amtrak, LIRR, NJT	NY	New York	Terminal and Transfer
Grand Central Terminal	MNRR	NY	New York	Terminal
Newark Pennsylvania Station	Amtrak, NJT, PATH	NJ	Essex	Transfer
Hoboken Terminal	NJT, MNRR, PATH	NJ	Hudson	Terminal
Atlantic Terminal	LIRR	NY	Kings	Terminal
Stamford Station	Amtrak, MNRR, Shore Line East	CT	Fairfield	Terminal and Transfer
Hunterspoint Avenue	LIRR	NY	Queens	Terminal
Woodside Station	LIRR	NY	Queens	Transfer
Jamaica Station	LIRR	NY	Queens	Transfer
Secaucus Junction	NJT, MNRR	NJ	Hudson	Transfer
New Haven Union Station	Amtrak, MNRR, Shore Line East, CT Rail	CT	New Haven	Terminal and Transfer
Trenton Station	Amtrak, NJT, SEPTA	NJ	Mercer	Terminal and Transfer

The following table shows all train lines operated by these commuter railroads in the New York metropolitan area. New Jersey Transit operates an additional train line in the Philadelphia metropolitan area. (Shown counterclockwise from the Atlantic Ocean):

Line or Branch	Railroad	Counties
Far Rockaway	LIRR	Kings, Queens, Nassau
Long Beach	LIRR	Nassau
Montauk	LIRR	Suffolk
Babylon	LIRR	Nassau, Suffolk
West Hempstead	LIRR	Kings (weekdays), Queens, Nassau
Hempstead	LIRR	Kings, Queens, Nassau
Ronkonkoma (Main Line)	LIRR	Nassau, Suffolk
Port Jefferson	LIRR	Nassau, Suffolk
Oyster Bay	LIRR	Nassau
Port Washington	LIRR	Queens, Nassau
New Haven	MNRR, Amtrak	New York, Bronx, Westchester, Fairfield, New Haven
Danbury	MNRR	New York, Fairfield
New Canaan	MNRR	New York, Fairfield
Waterbury	MNRR	Fairfield, New Haven
Harlem	MNRR	New York, Bronx, Westchester, Putnam, Dutchess
Hudson	MNRR, Amtrak	Bronx, Westchester, Putnam, Dutchess
Pascack Valley	MNRR, NJT	Hudson, Bergen, Rockland
Port Jervis / Main Line / Bergen County	MNRR, NJT	Hudson, Bergen, Passaic, Rockland, Orange
Montclair–Boonton	NJT	New York, Hudson, Essex, Passaic, Morris, Warren
Morris & Essex (Morristown Line and Gladstone Branch)	NJT	New York, Hudson, Essex, Union, Morris, Somerset, Warren
Raritan Valley	NJT	Hudson, Essex, Union, Middlesex, Somerset, Hunterdon
Northeast Corridor and Princeton Branch	NJT, Amtrak	New York, Hudson, Essex, Union, Middlesex, Mercer
North Jersey Coast	NJT	New York, Hudson, Essex, Union, Middlesex, Monmouth, Ocean
Shore Line East	CT Rail, Amtrak	Fairfield, New Haven
Hartford	CT Rail, Amtrak	New Haven

=== Major highways ===
The following highways serve the region:

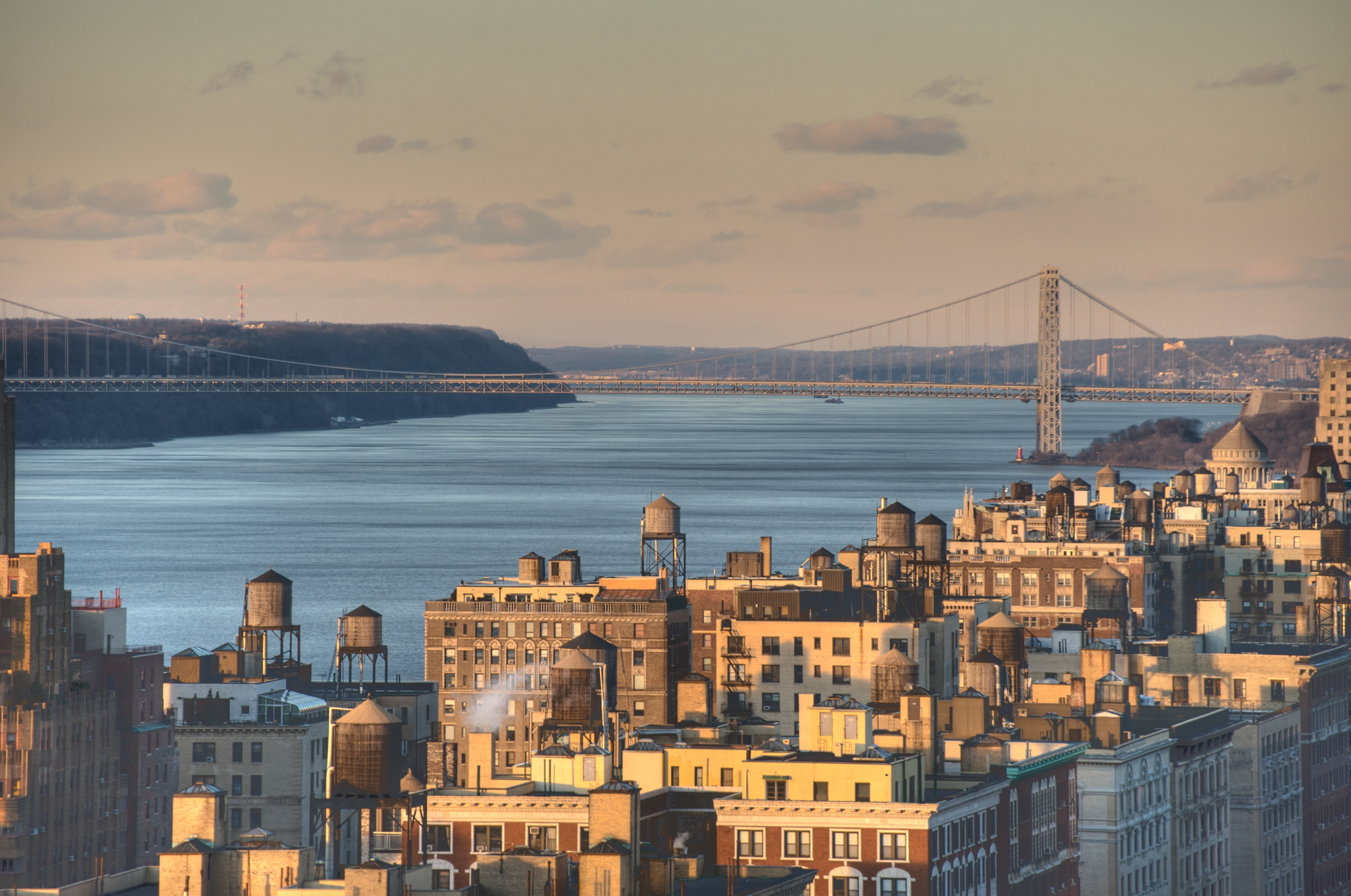
The George Washington Bridge, connecting Washington Heights in Upper Manhattan across the Hudson River to Fort Lee in Bergen County, New Jersey, is the world's busiest motor vehicle bridge. Interstate 95 and U.S. Route 1/9 cross the river via the bridge, while U.S. Route 46, which lies entirely within New Jersey, ends halfway across the bridge at the state border with New York.

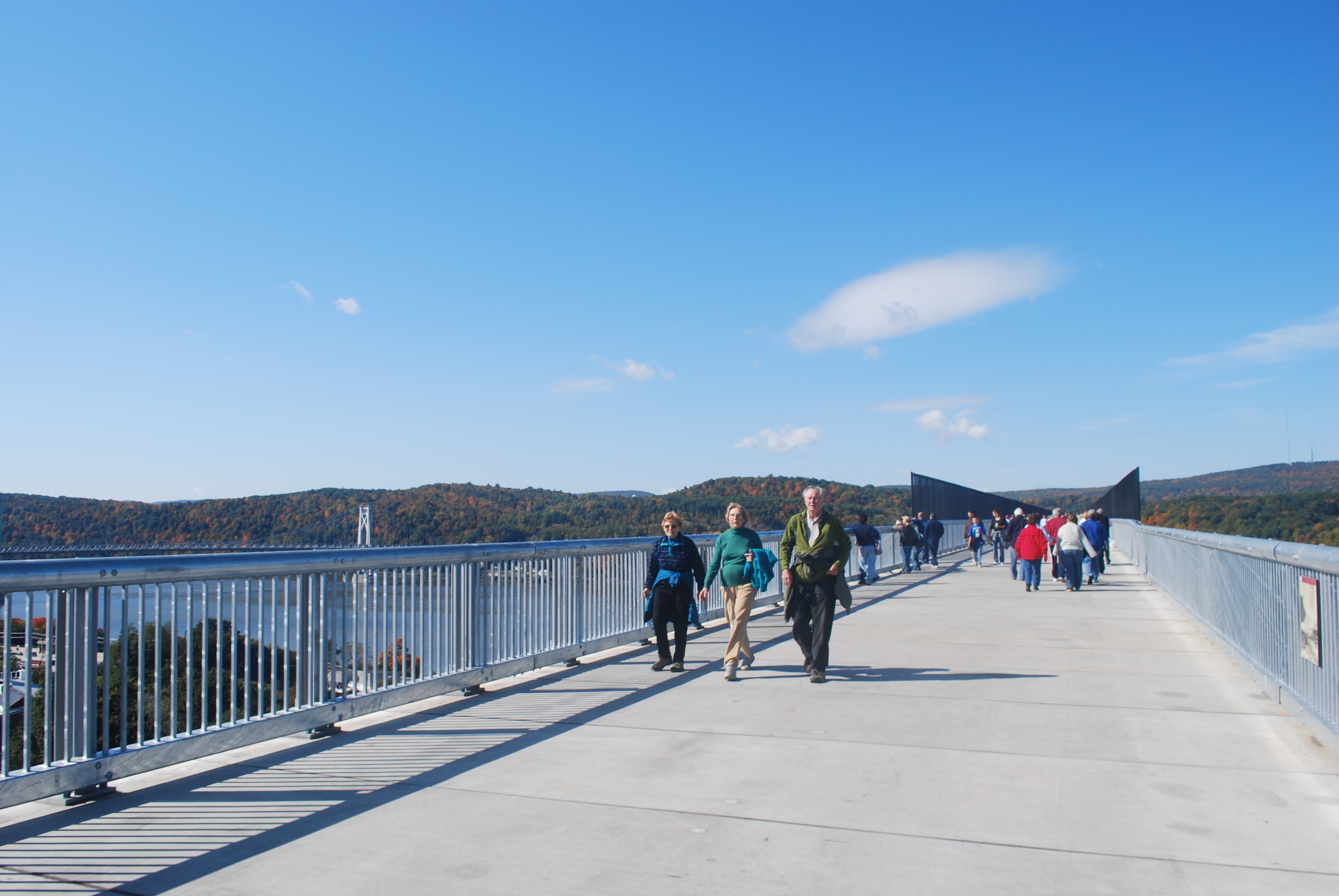
The Walkway over the Hudson, the world's longest pedestrian bridge, connects Ulster and Dutchess counties in New York.

==== Interstates ====
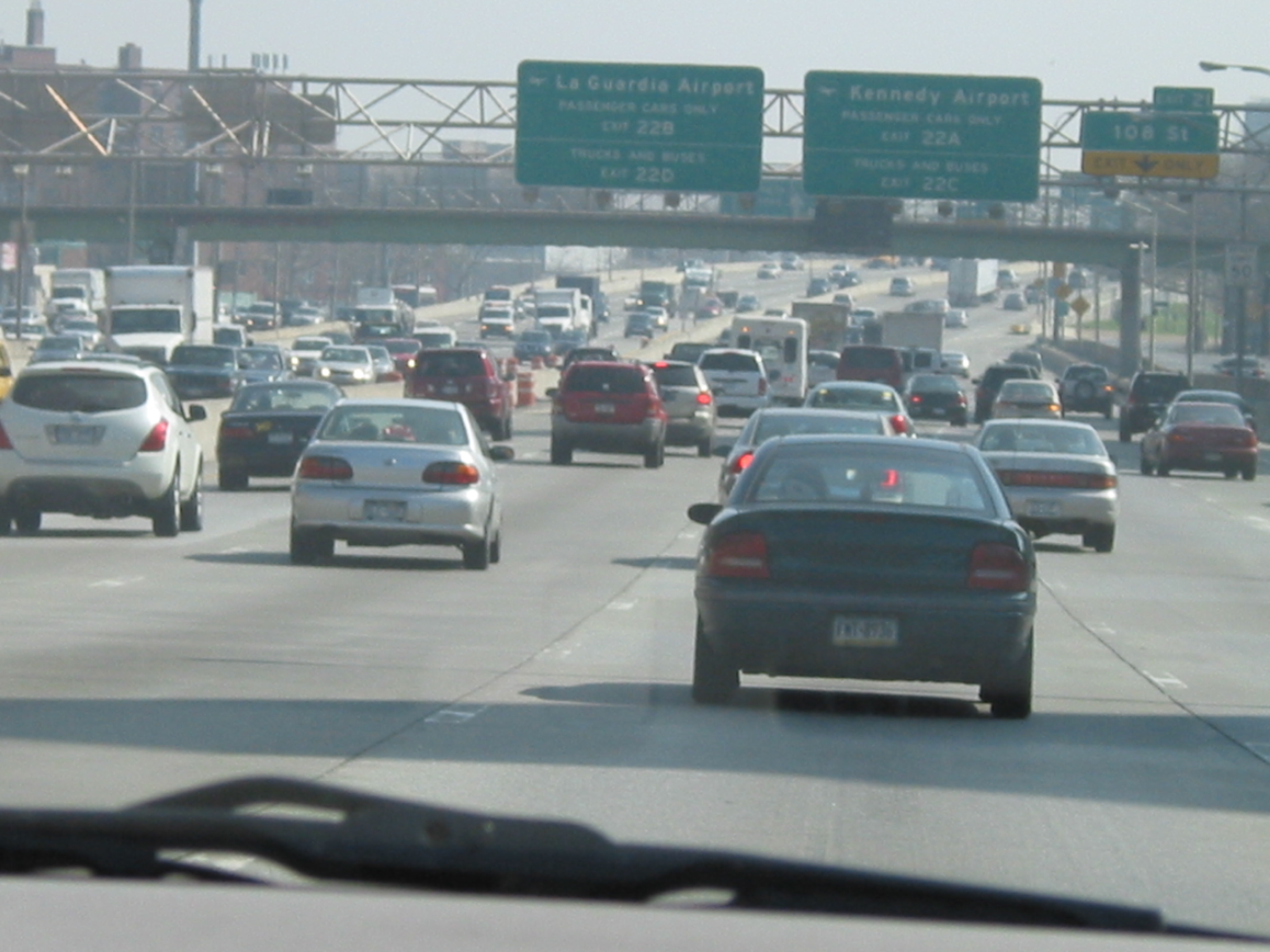
The Long Island Expressway (I-495), viewing eastbound in Corona, Queens.

- I-78
- I-80
- I-84
- I-87
- I-91
- I-95
- I-195
- I-278 – serves as southern beltway around New York City
- I-280
- I-287 – serves as northern beltway around New York City
- I-295
- I-295 – serves as a northern partial beltway around Trenton in Mercer County, NJ
- I-478
- I-495 − also known as Long Island Expressway or LIE
- I-678
- I-684
- I-695
- I-878 – unsigned

==== U.S. Routes ====
- US 1
- US 5
- US 6
- US 7
- US 9
- US 22
- US 44
- US 46
- US 130
- US 202
- US 206
- US 209

==== State Routes ====
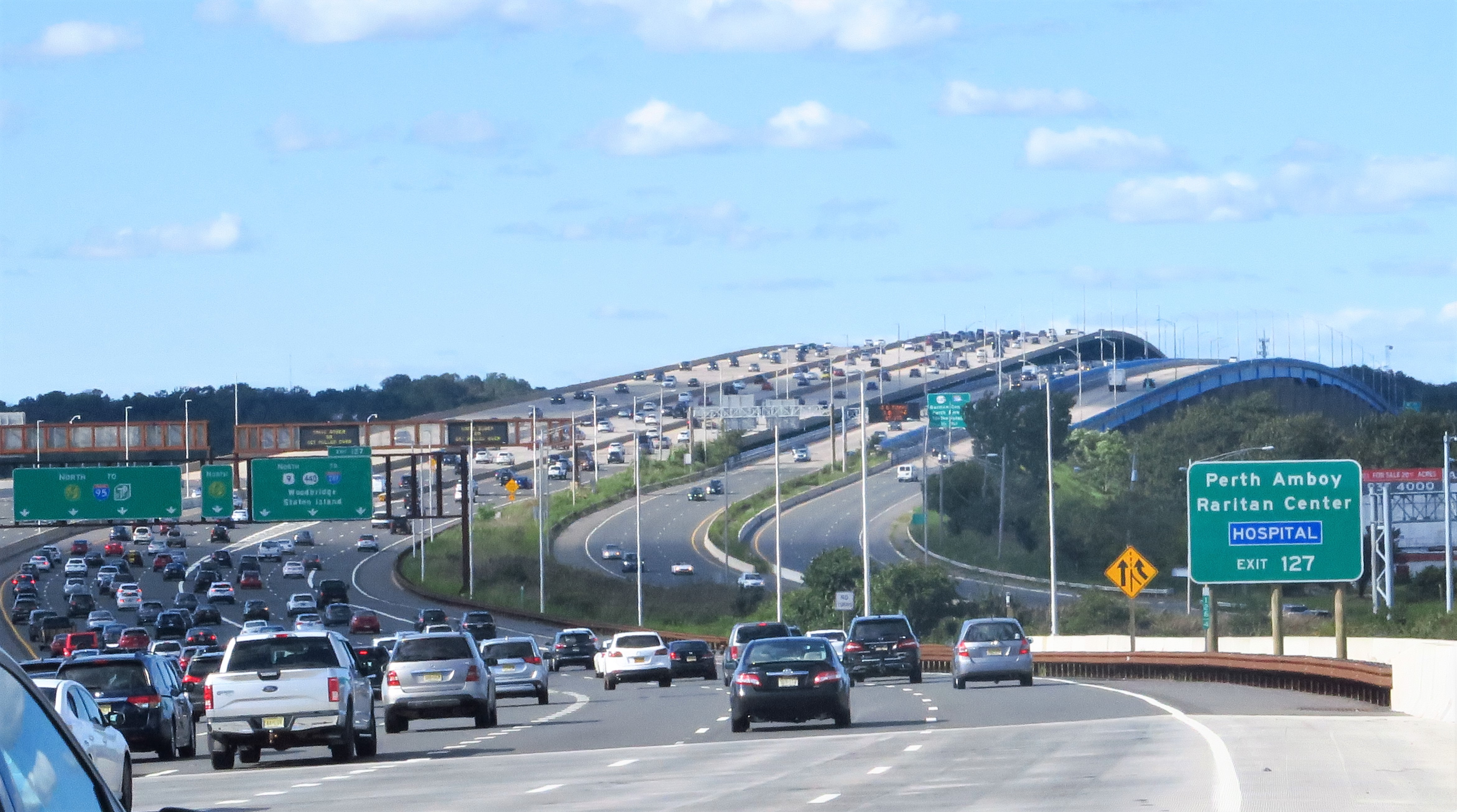
Governor Alfred E. Driscoll Bridge in Middlesex County connects Woodbridge and Sayreville, New Jersey across the Raritan River.

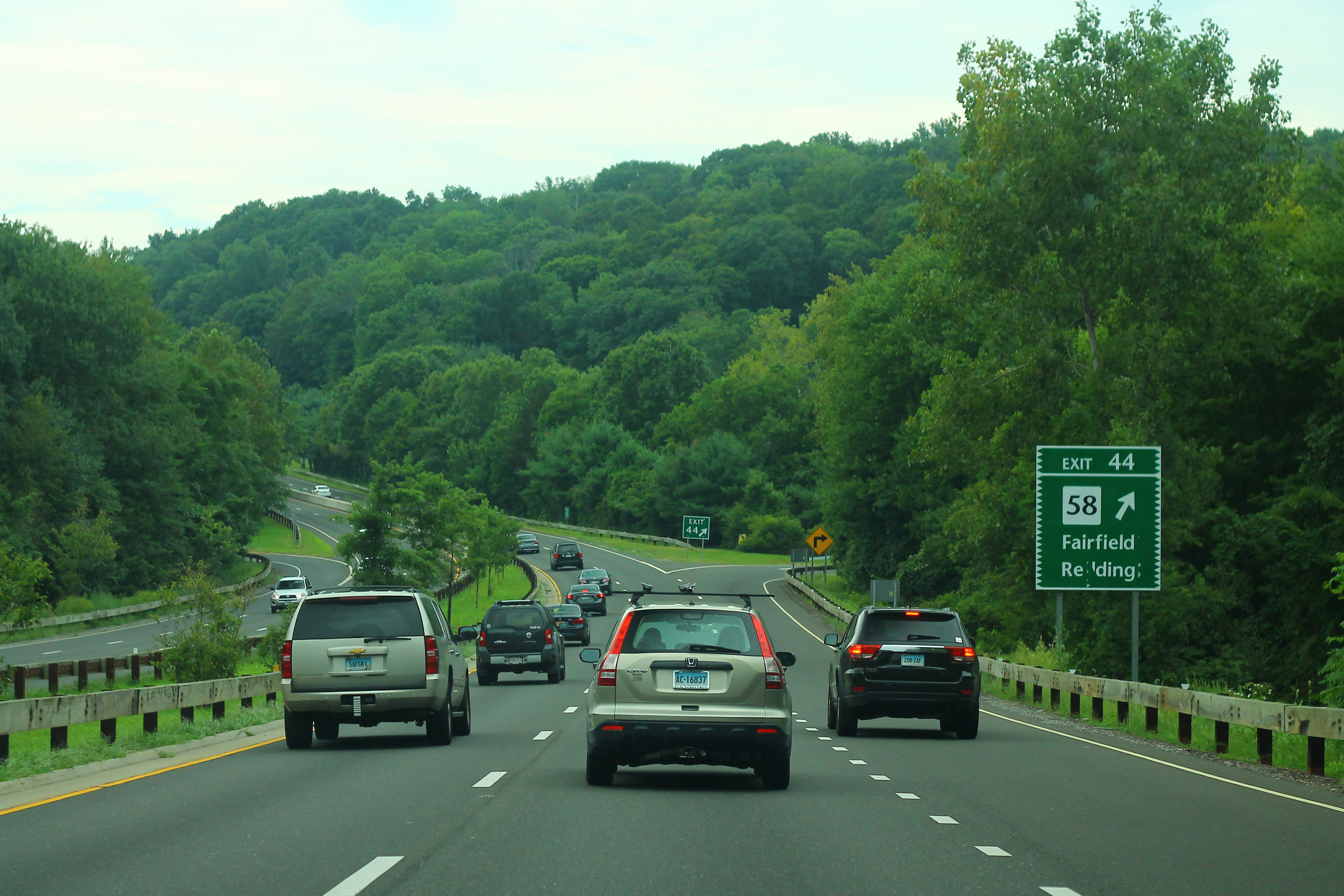
Merritt Parkway southbound in Fairfield County, Connecticut.

- Route 3
- Route 4
- Route 8
- NY 9A
- Route 15
- Route 17
- Route 18
- Route 21
- Route 23
- Route 24
- NY 24
- Route 25
- NY 25
- Route 27
- NY 27
- Route 28
- Route 29
- Route 31
- Route 33
- Route 34
- Route 35
- Route 36
- Route 53
- Route 62
- Route 139
- Route 208
- NY 440 / Route 440
- Route 495
- NY 895

==== Other limited-access roads ====
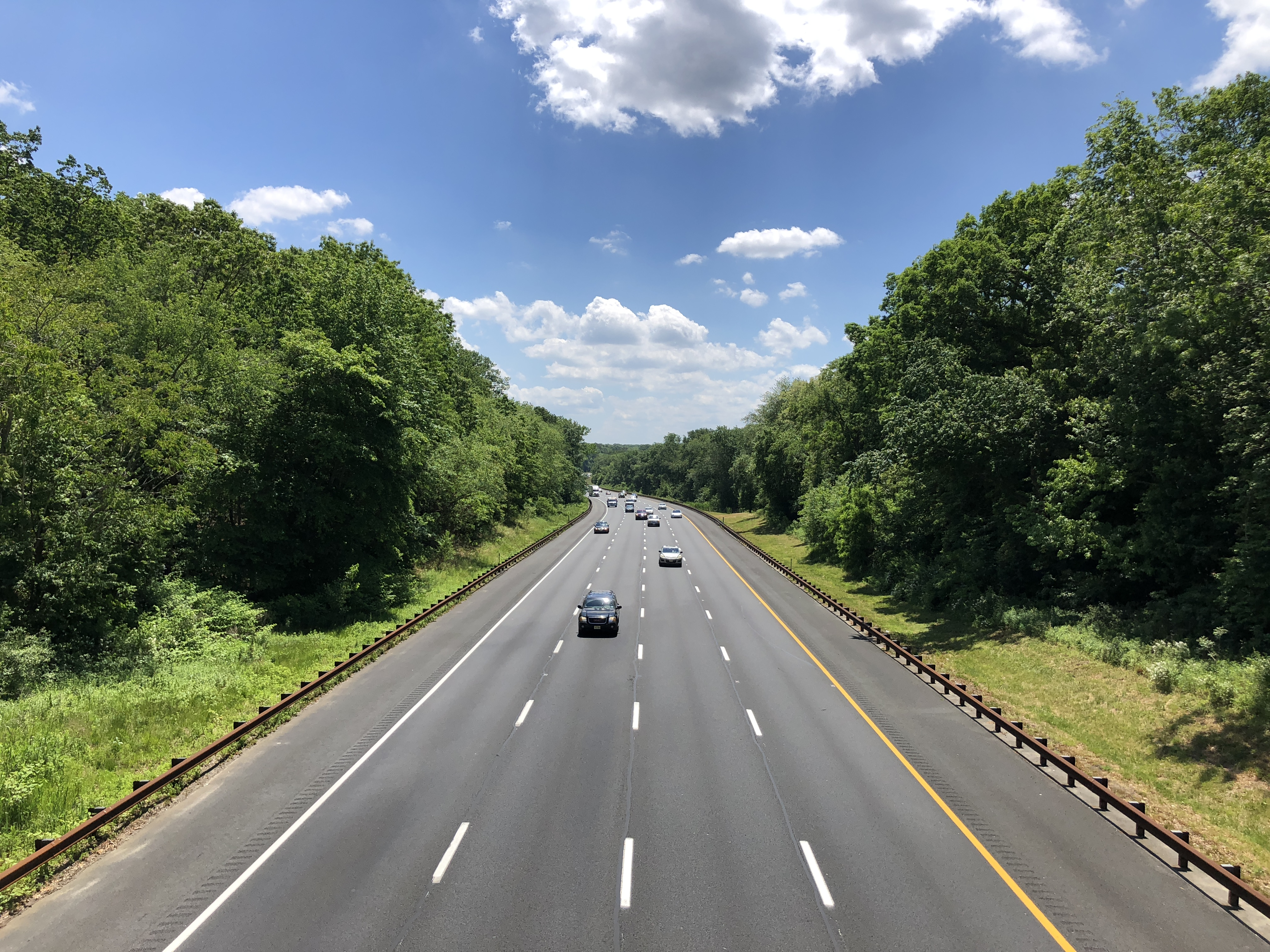
View south along the northbound lanes of the Garden State Parkway from the overpass for the Capital to Coast Trail in Wall Township, Monmouth County, New Jersey.

Some of these roads have a numerical designation assigned to it:

- Belt Parkway
- Bronx River Parkway
- Conn. Turnpike (part of I-95)
- Cross Island Parkway
- FDR Drive
- G.S. Parkway
- Grand Central Parkway
- Harlem River Drive
- Henry Hudson Parkway
- Hutchinson River Parkway
- Jackie Robinson Parkway (formerly: Interboro Parkway)
- Merritt Parkway (part of Route 15)
- N.J. Turnpike (part of I-95)
- New York Thruway (part of I-87)
- Northern State Parkway
- Palisades Parkway
- Saw Mill River Parkway
- Southern State Parkway
- Sprain Brook Parkway
- Taconic State Parkway

==== Named bridges and tunnels ====
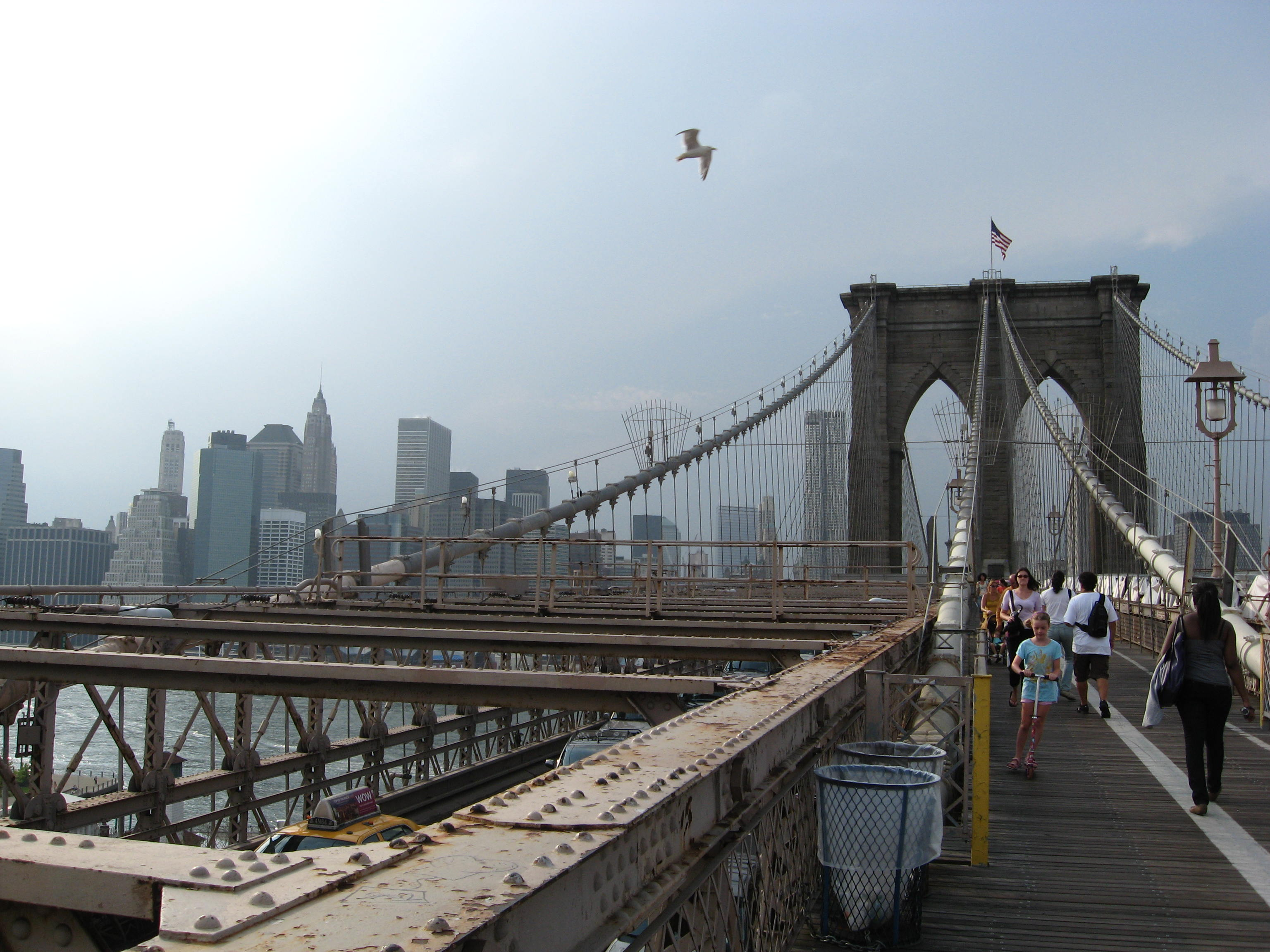
The Brooklyn Bridge connects Manhattan and Brooklyn.

Verrazzano–Narrows Bridge, one of the world's longest suspension bridges, connects Brooklyn and Staten Island across The Narrows.

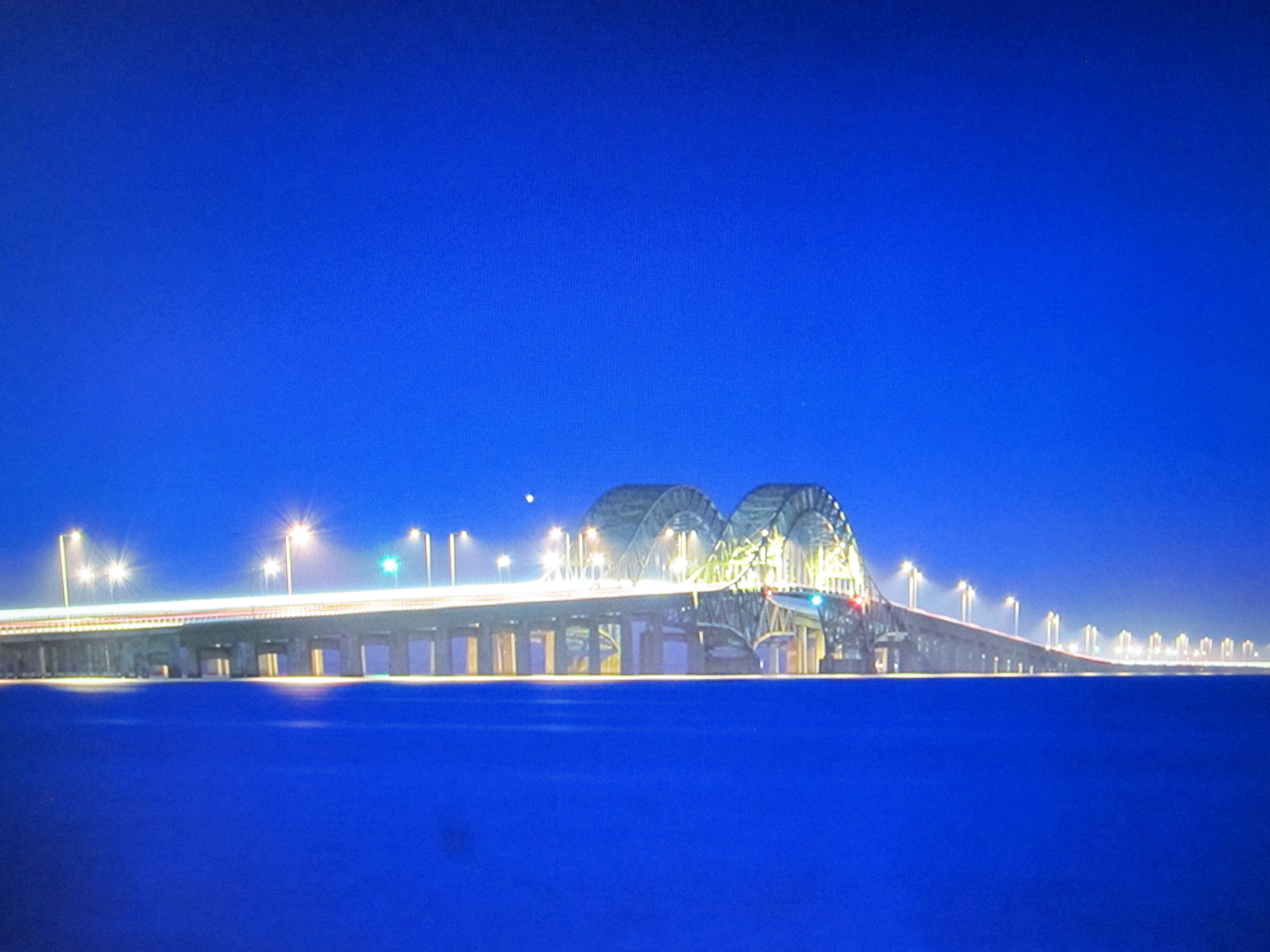
Great South Bay Bridge, in Suffolk County, connects Long Island with the barrier islands across the Great South Bay.

- Alexander Hamilton Bridge connecting the Trans-Manhattan Expressway in the Washington Heights section of Manhattan and the Cross-Bronx Expressway, as part of Interstate 95
- Basilone Bridge (part of I-95 and the New Jersey Turnpike)
- Chaplain Washington–Harry Laderman Bridge (part of I-95 and NJ Turnpike)
- Bayonne Bridge (part of NY 440 and NJ 440), underwent a $1 billion project to raise the roadway by 64 feet to 215 feet to allow taller container ships to pass underneath to access seaports in New York City and northern New Jersey.
- Bear Mountain Bridge (part of US 6 and US 202)
- Bronx–Whitestone Bridge (part of I-678) – connects the boroughs of Bronx and Queens.
- Brooklyn Bridge, iconic of New York and designated a National Historic Landmark by the U.S. National Park Service on January 29, 1964. Connects Brooklyn and lower Manhattan (at Park Row and City Hall).
- Brooklyn–Battery Tunnel (part of I-478), officially renamed the Hugh L. Carey Tunnel, in honor of the former New York State governor – connects Brooklyn and lower Manhattan (financial district).
- Delaware Water Gap Toll Bridge (part of I-80 crossing the Delaware River)
- Driscoll Bridge (part of the Garden State Parkway), with a total of 15 travel lanes and 6 shoulder lanes, the widest motor vehicle bridge in the world by number of lanes and one of the world's busiest.
- Ed Koch Queensboro Bridge (part of NY 25) – renamed in honor of former New York Mayor Edward I. Koch, also known informally as the "59th Street Bridge". Connects Queens and the east side of Manhattan.
- George Washington Bridge (part of I-95 and US 1-9/46), the world's busiest motor vehicle bridge and one of the world's widest, with 14 lanes.
- Goethals Bridge (part of I-278)
- Great South Bay Bridge, Long Island
- Heroes Tunnel (formerly the West Rock Tunnel) (part of CT 15)
- Holland Tunnel (part of I-78 and NJ 139)
- Lincoln Tunnel (part of Route 495)
- Manhattan Bridge, connecting Brooklyn to Chinatown, Manhattan, carries four tracks of the B, D, N, and Q trains of the New York City Subway, in addition to seven lanes of traffic.
- Mid-Hudson Bridge (part of US 44 and NY 55)
- Newark Bay Bridge (part of I-78)
- New Hope – Lambertville Toll Bridge (part of US 202 crossing the Delaware River)
- Newburgh–Beacon Bridge (part of I-84 and NY 52)
- Otisville Tunnel (takes the Metro-North Railroad Port Jervis Line through the Shawangunk Ridge in Orange County, New York)
- Outerbridge Crossing (part of NY 440 and NJ 440)
- Pearl Harbor Memorial Bridge (part of I-95 and the Connecticut Turnpike)
- Poughkeepsie Bridge, also known as Walkway over the Hudson, the world's longest pedestrian bridge, connecting Ulster and Dutchess counties in New York
- Pulaski Skyway (part of US 1–9)
- Queens–Midtown Tunnel (part of I-495) – connects Queens and Midtown Manhattan.
- Scudder Falls Bridge (part of I-295 crossing the Delaware River)
- Sikorsky Memorial Bridge (part of CT 15 Merritt & Wilbur Cross Parkways)
- Tappan Zee Bridge (part of I-87, I-287, and the New York State Thruway), the longest bridge in New York State; underwent a $4 billion replacement.
- Thomas Alva Edison Memorial Bridge (part of US 9)
- Throgs Neck Bridge (part of I-295) – connects the boroughs of Bronx and Queens (at the western end of Long Island Sound).
- Trenton–Morrisville Toll Bridge (part of US 1)
- Triborough Bridge (part of I-278), officially renamed the Robert F. Kennedy (RFK) Bridge – connects the three boroughs of Manhattan, Bronx and Queens (hence its name).
- Verrazzano–Narrows Bridge (part of I-278), the longest suspension bridge in the Americas and one of the longest in the world (formerly the world's longest) – connects the boroughs of Staten Island and Brooklyn.
- William A. Stickel Memorial Bridge (part of I-280)
- Williamsburg Bridge, carries 2 tracks of the J, M, and Z trains of the New York City Subway, in addition to 8 lanes of traffic – connects Williamsburg, Brooklyn, and the Lower East Side or Manhattan.

=== Commuter bus ===
New Jersey Transit, Academy Bus, Coach USA, Spanish Transportation, Trailways of New York, and several other companies operate commuter coaches into the Port Authority Bus Terminal in Manhattan, and many other bus services in New Jersey. Bus services also operate in other nearby counties in the states of New York and Connecticut, but most terminate at a subway terminal or other rail station.

=== Major airports ===
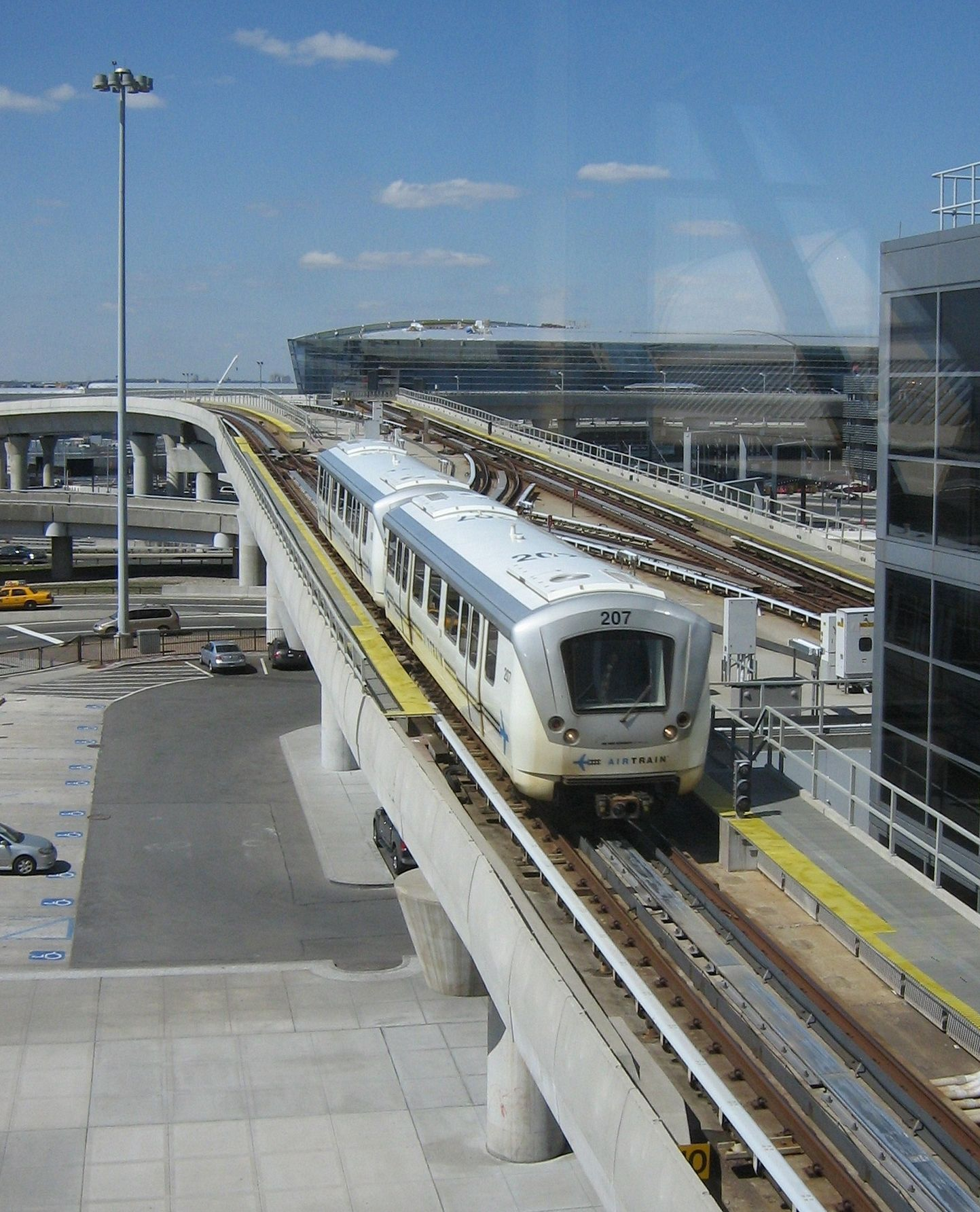
The AirTrain at JFK International Airport in Jamaica, Queens in April 2007

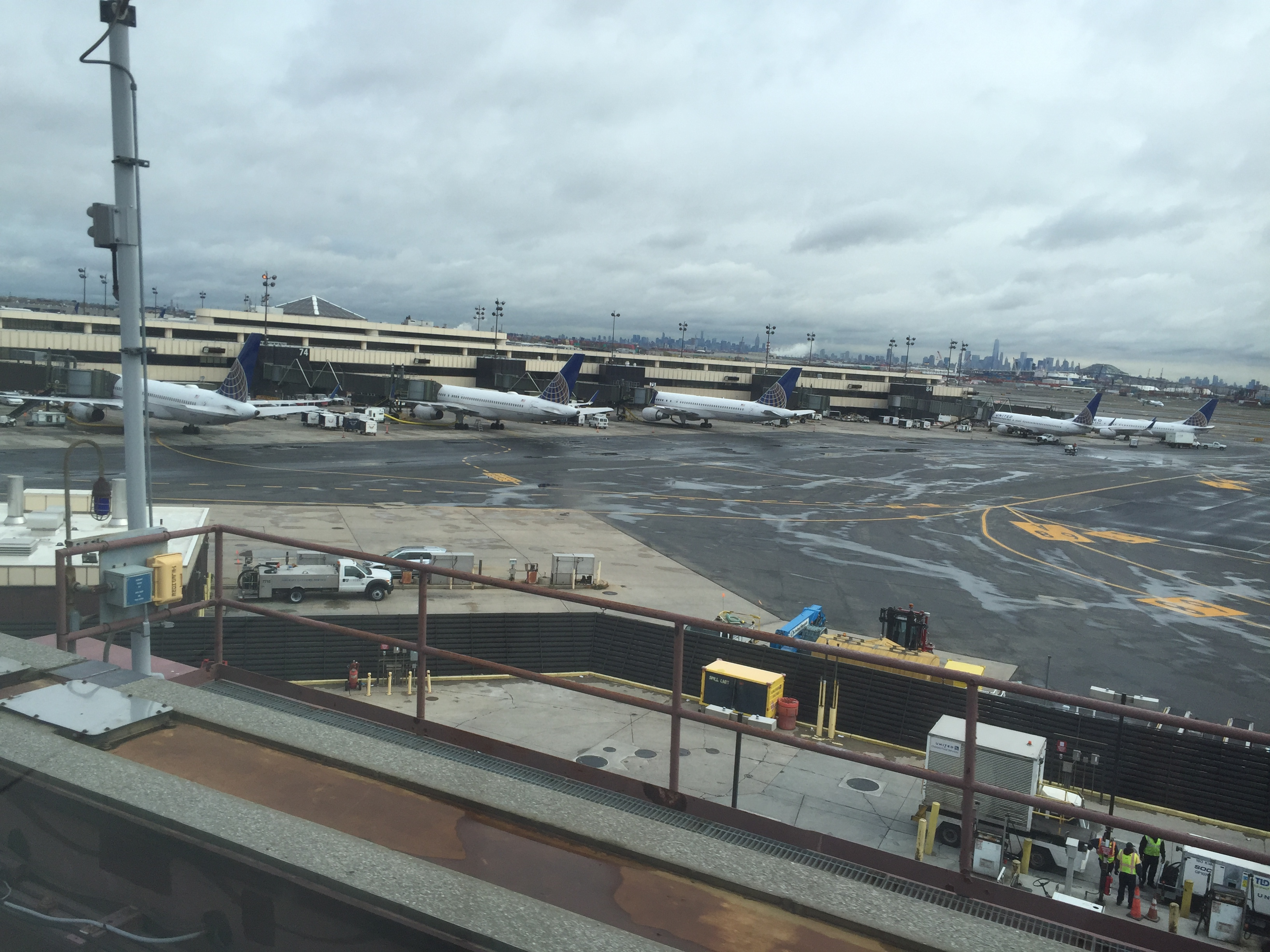
View of Manhattan from the Airtrain at Newark Liberty International Airport in November 2015

The three busiest airports in the New York metropolitan area are John F. Kennedy International Airport, Newark Liberty International Airport, and LaGuardia Airport; 130.5 million travelers used these three airports in 2016, and the metropolitan area's airspace is the busiest in the nation.

Airport	IATA code	ICAO code	County	State
John F. Kennedy International Airport	JFK	KJFK	Queens	New York
Newark Liberty International Airport	EWR	KEWR	Essex/Union	New Jersey
LaGuardia Airport	LGA	KLGA	Queens	New York

The following smaller airports are also in the metro area and provide daily commercial service:

Airport	IATA code	ICAO code	County	State
Long Island MacArthur Airport	ISP	KISP	Suffolk	New York
Stewart International Airport	SWF	KSWF	Orange	New York
Trenton–Mercer Airport	TTN	KTTN	Mercer	New Jersey
Westchester County Airport	HPN	KHPN	Westchester	New York

=== Commuter usage ===
According to the 2010 American Community Survey, 54.3% (5,476,169) of commuters used a car or other private vehicle alone, 7.0% (708,788) used a carpool, 27.0% (2,721,372) used public transportation, 5.5% (558,434) walked to work, 2.0% (200,448) used some other means of transportation such as a bicycle to get to work.

== Culture and contemporary life ==
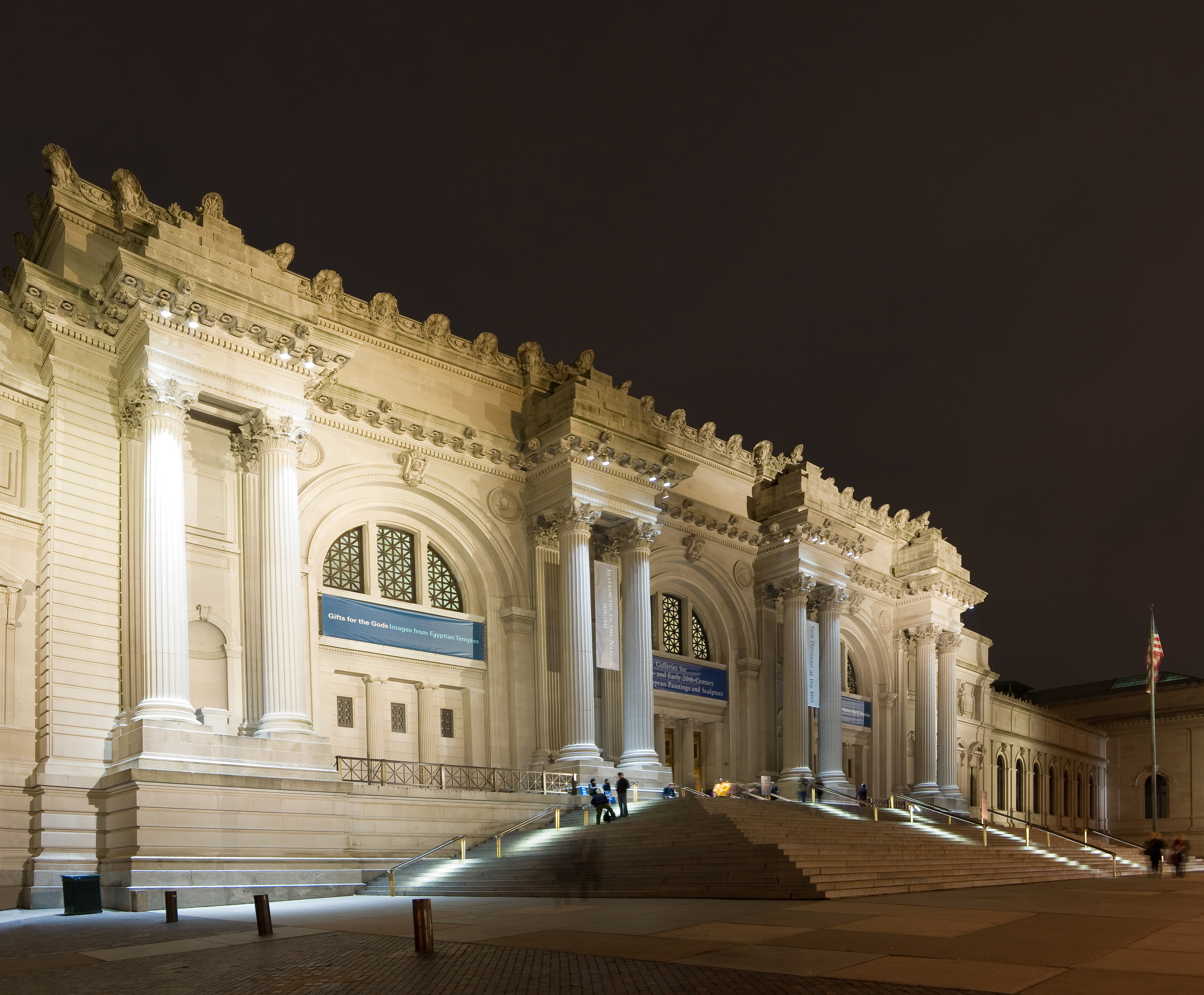
Metropolitan Museum of Art, part of Museum Mile in the Carnegie Hill neighborhood of Manhattan's Upper East Side, is one of the largest and most visited museums in the world.

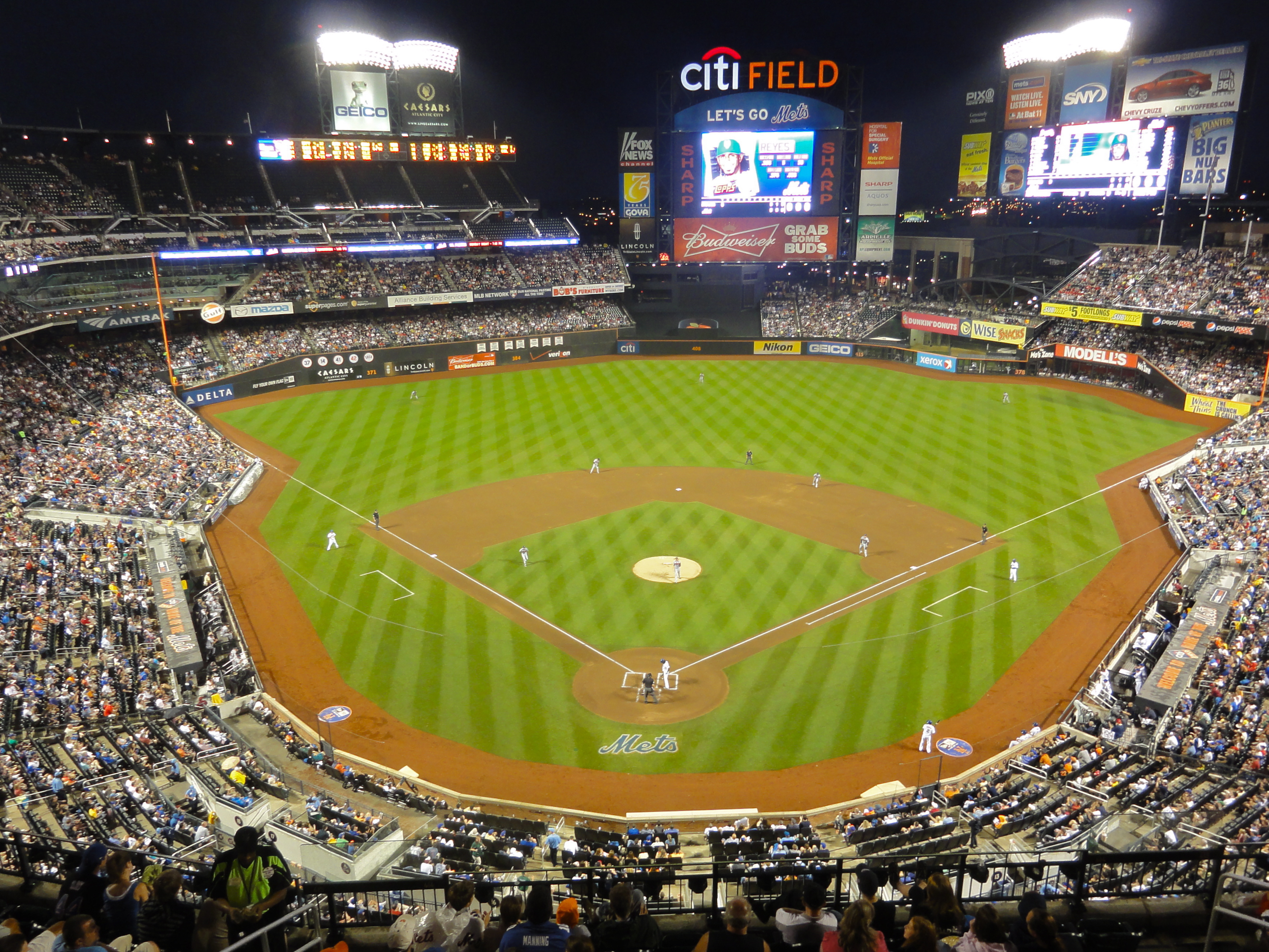
Citi Field in Flushing, Queens, home of the New York Mets

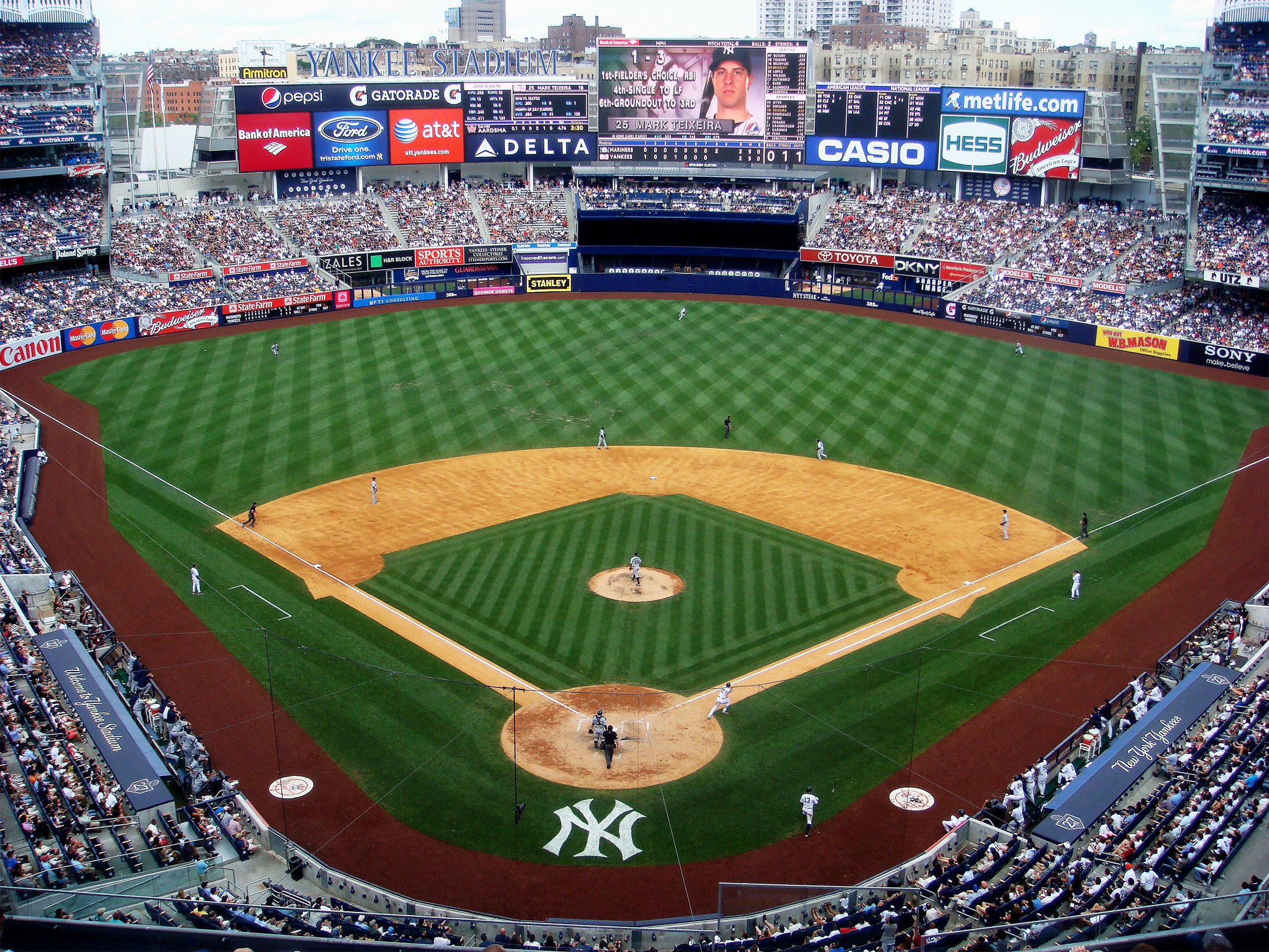
Yankee Stadium in the South Bronx, home of the New York Yankees and New York City FC

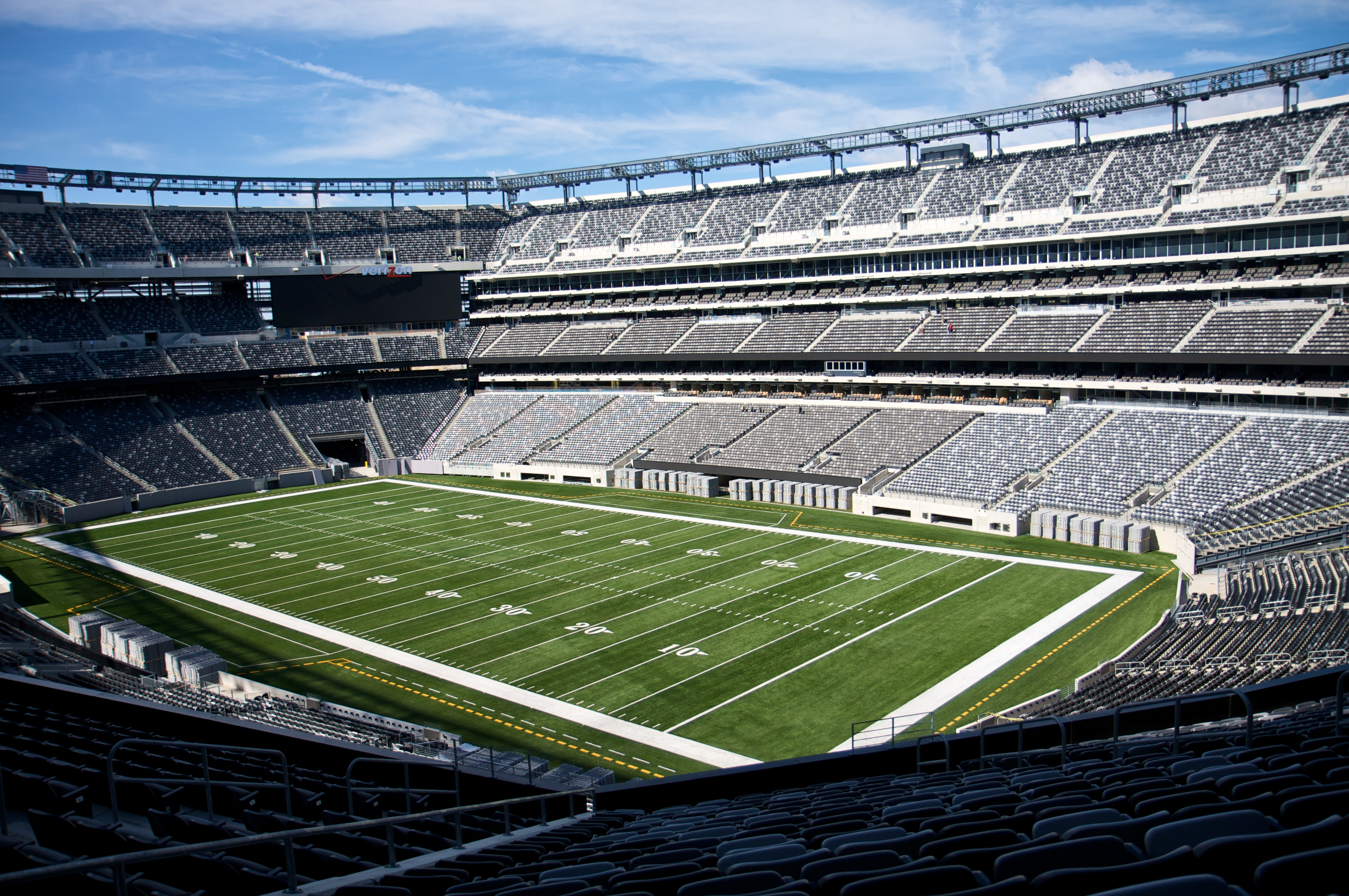
MetLife Stadium in East Rutherford, New Jersey, home to the New York Giants and New York Jets, was the most expensive stadium ever built, at approximately $1.6 billion.

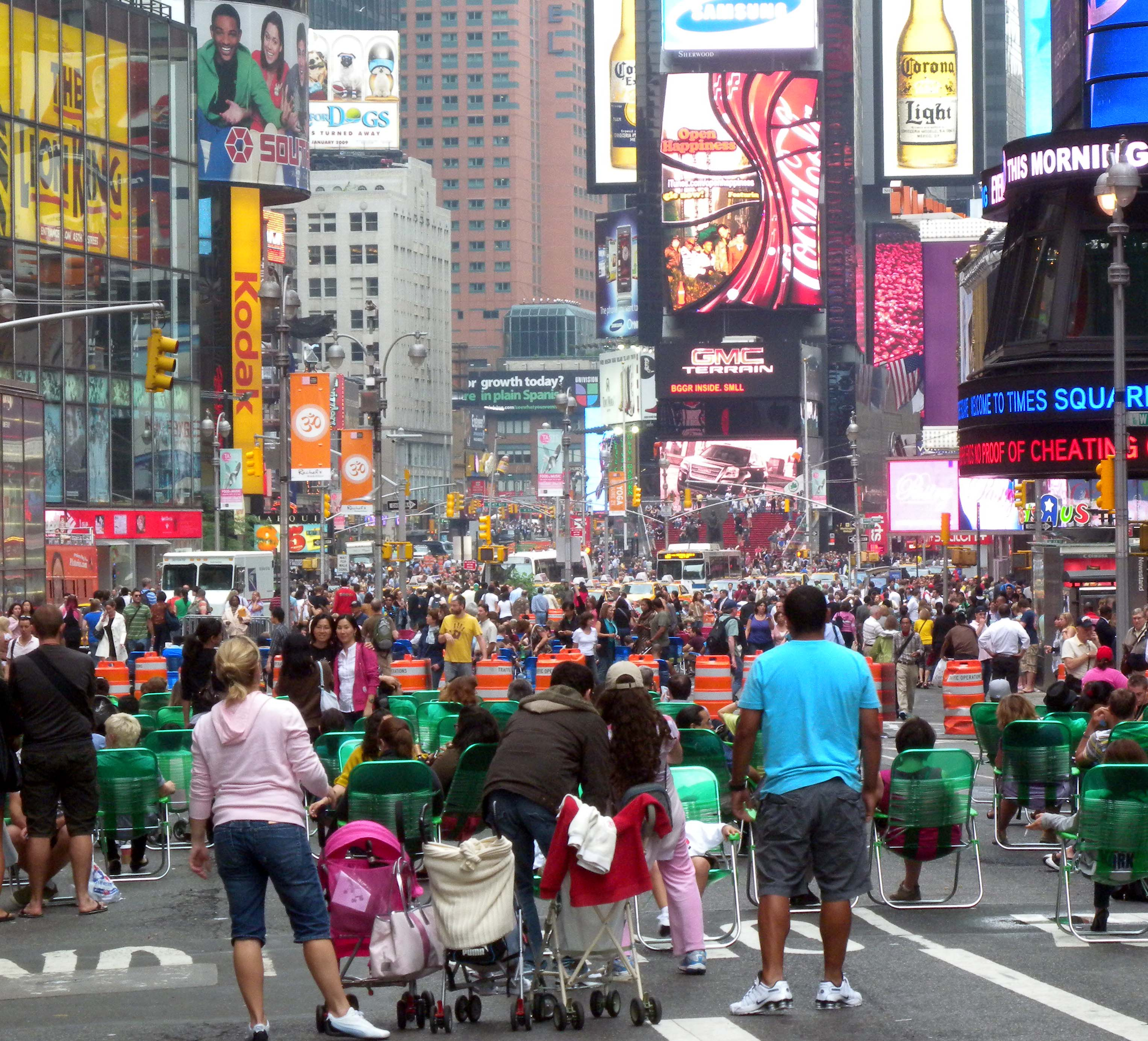
Travel + Leisure magazine's October 2011 survey named Times Square in Midtown Manhattan, iconified as the "Crossroads of the World", the world's most visited tourist attraction with over 39 million visitors annually.

New York has been described as the cultural capital of the world by the diplomatic consulates of Iceland and Latvia and by New York's own Baruch College. A book containing a series of essays titled New York, culture capital of the world, 1940–1965 has also been published as showcased by the National Library of Australia. Tom Wolfe has quoted regarding New York's culture that "Culture just seems to be in the air, like part of the weather."

Although Manhattan remains the epicenter of cultural life in the metropolitan area, the entire region is replete with prominent cultural institutions, with artistic performances and ethnically oriented events receiving international attention throughout the year.

=== Sports teams ===
The New York metropolitan area is home to the headquarters of the National Football League, Major League Baseball, the National Basketball Association, the National Hockey League, and Major League Soccer. Four of the ten most expensive stadiums ever built worldwide (MetLife Stadium, the new Yankee Stadium, Madison Square Garden, and Citi Field) are located in the New York metropolitan area. The New York metropolitan area has the highest total number of professional sports teams in these five leagues.

Listing of the professional sports teams in the New York metropolitan area:

==== Baseball ====
- Major League Baseball (MLB)
  - New York Mets (Queens, New York City)
  - New York Yankees (The Bronx, New York City)
- Minor League Baseball (MiLB)
  - Eastern League (AA)
    - Trenton Thunder (Yankees) (Trenton, New Jersey)
  - South Atlantic League (A)
    - Jersey Shore BlueClaws (Phillies) (Lakewood Township, New Jersey)
    - Brooklyn Cyclones (Mets) (Brooklyn, New York City)
    - Hudson Valley Renegades (Rays) (Fishkill, New York)
- Atlantic League of Professional Baseball (ALPB)
  - Staten Island FerryHawks (Staten Island, New York City)
  - Bridgeport Bluefish (Bridgeport, Connecticut)
  - Long Island Ducks (Central Islip, New York)
  - Somerset Patriots (Bridgewater Township, New Jersey)
- Canadian American Association of Professional Baseball (CanAm League)
  - New Jersey Jackals (Little Falls, New Jersey)
  - Newark Bears (Newark, New Jersey)
  - New York Boulders (Pomona, New York)

==== Basketball ====
- National Basketball Association (NBA)
  - Brooklyn Nets (Brooklyn, New York City)
  - New York Knicks (Manhattan, New York City)
- Women's National Basketball Association (WNBA)
  - New York Liberty (Brooklyn, New York City)

==== Football ====
- National Football League (NFL)
  - New York Giants (East Rutherford, New Jersey)
  - New York Jets (East Rutherford, New Jersey)

==== Hockey ====
- National Hockey League (NHL)
  - New Jersey Devils (Newark, New Jersey)
  - New York Islanders (Elmont, New York)
  - New York Rangers (Manhattan, New York City)
- American Hockey League (AHL)
  - Bridgeport Sound Tigers (Islanders) (Bridgeport, Connecticut)
- Professional Women's Hockey League (PWHL)
  - New York Sirens (Newark, New Jersey)

==== Lacrosse ====
- Major League Lacrosse (outdoor) (MLL)
  - New York Lizards (Hempstead, New York)

==== Soccer ====
- Major League Soccer (MLS)
  - New York City FC (The Bronx, New York City)
  - New York Red Bulls (Harrison, New Jersey)
- National Women's Soccer League (NWSL)
  - NJ/NY Gotham FC (Harrison, New Jersey)

==== College sports ====
- College sports (NCAA Division I)
  - Army Black Knights (West Point, New York)
  - Columbia University Lions (Manhattan, New York City)
  - Fairfield University Stags (Fairfield, Connecticut)
  - Fairleigh Dickinson University Knights (Teaneck, New Jersey)
  - Fordham University Rams (The Bronx, New York City)
  - Hofstra University Pride (Hempstead, New York)
  - Iona College Gaels (New Rochelle, New York)
  - Long Island University Blackbirds (Brooklyn, New York City)
  - Manhattan College Jaspers and Lady Jaspers (The Bronx, New York City)
  - Marist College Red Foxes (Poughkeepsie, New York)
  - Monmouth University Hawks (West Long Branch, New Jersey)
  - New Jersey Institute of Technology Highlanders (Newark, New Jersey)
  - Princeton University Tigers (Princeton, New Jersey)
  - Quinnipiac University Bobcats (Hamden, Connecticut)
  - Rider University Broncs (Lawrenceville, New Jersey)
  - Rutgers University Scarlet Knights (Piscataway / New Brunswick, New Jersey)
  - Sacred Heart University Pioneers (Fairfield, Connecticut)
  - Saint Peter's University Peacocks (Jersey City, New Jersey)
  - St. John's University Red Storm (Queens, New York City)
  - Seton Hall University Pirates (South Orange, New Jersey)
  - Stony Brook University Seawolves (Stony Brook, New York)
  - Wagner College Seahawks (Staten Island, New York City)
  - Yale University Bulldogs (New Haven, Connecticut)

=== Media ===
The New York metropolitan area is home to the headquarters of several well-known media companies, subsidiaries, and publications, including Thomson Reuters, The New York Times Company, the Associated Press, Warner Bros. Discovery, NBCUniversal, the Hearst Corporation, Paramount Global, News Corp, the Fox Corporation, The Wall Street Journal, Fox News, ABC, CBS, and NBC. Local television channels broadcasting to the New York market include WCBS-TV 2 (CBS), WNBC 4 (NBC), WNYW 5 (FOX), WABC-TV 7 (ABC), WWOR-TV 9 (MyNetworkTV), WPIX 11 (CW), WNET 13 (PBS), WNYE-TV 25 (NYC Media) and WPXN-TV 31 (Ion). NY1 is a 24/7 local news provider available only to cable television subscribers. Radio stations serving the area include: WNYC, WKCR, WFMU, WABC, and WFAN. Many television and radio stations use the top of the Empire State Building to broadcast their terrestrial television signals, while some media entities broadcast from studios in Times Square.

The New York metropolitan area is extensive enough so that its own channels must compete with channels from neighboring television markets (including Philadelphia, Scranton/Wilkes-Barre, and Hartford) within its outlying counties. Cable companies offer such competition in the Pennsylvania portion, Connecticut, and a few counties in central New Jersey.

=== Theme parks ===
==== In New Jersey ====
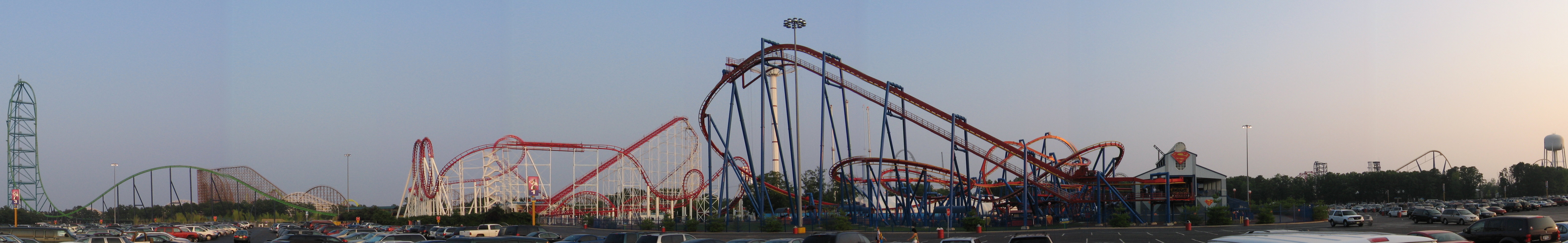
Skyline of Six Flags Great Adventure in Jackson Township, New Jersey, the world's largest theme park To the far left is Kingda Ka, the world's tallest roller coaster until its closure in 2024.

Main Park	Other Parks	Location	Year Opened
Six Flags Great Adventure	Six Flags Wild Safari, Six Flags Hurricane Harbor	Jackson	1974
Land of Make Believe	None	Hope	1954
Mountain Creek Waterpark	None	Vernon	1998

==== In New York State ====
Coney Island, in Brooklyn, is considered one of America's first amusement parks.

Playland, in Rye, Westchester County, has been open since 1928.

Legoland New York, in Goshen, Orange County, opened in 2021.

Plans were unveiled by New York Mayor Michael Bloomberg on September 27, 2012, for the New York Wheel, a giant Ferris wheel, to be built at the northern shore of Staten Island, overlooking the Statue of Liberty, New York Harbor, and the Lower Manhattan skyline.

== Area codes ==
The area is served by at least 26 area codes:

- 212: Serves Manhattan and is overlaid with 646, 917, and 332.
- 718: Serves all other boroughs of New York City and is overlaid with 347, 917, and 929.
- 917: Serves all of New York City.
- 516 & 363: Serve Nassau County.
- 631 & 934: Serve Suffolk County.
- 914: Serves Westchester County.
- 845: Serves the Hudson Valley counties of southern New York State.
- 570 & 272: Serves Pike County in Pennsylvania.
- 203 & 475: Serves southwestern Connecticut.
- 860 & 959: Serves the rest of Connecticut not served by 203 or 475.
- 201: Serves most of Bergen County, as well as parts of Essex, Hudson, and Passaic in Northern New Jersey, and is overlaid with 551.
- 973: Serves portions of Bergen, Essex, Hudson, Morris, Passaic, Sussex, and portions of Union County in Northern New Jersey, and is overlaid with 862.
- 908: Serves communities in Union County, Somerset County, northern parts of Middlesex County, Hunterdon County, Warren County, and Morris County as well as some cell phones in Monmouth County in Central New Jersey.
- 732: Serves Middlesex County, Somerset County, portions of Union County, Monmouth and northern Ocean counties in Central New Jersey; overlaid with 848.
- 609 & 640: Serves Mercer County and parts of Middlesex, Monmouth, and Ocean Counties in Central New Jersey.

== See also ==
- Biotech and pharmaceutical companies in the New York metropolitan area
- Regional Plan Association
- Tech companies in the New York metropolitan area
- Transportation in New York City
